= Mirrors in Mesoamerican culture =

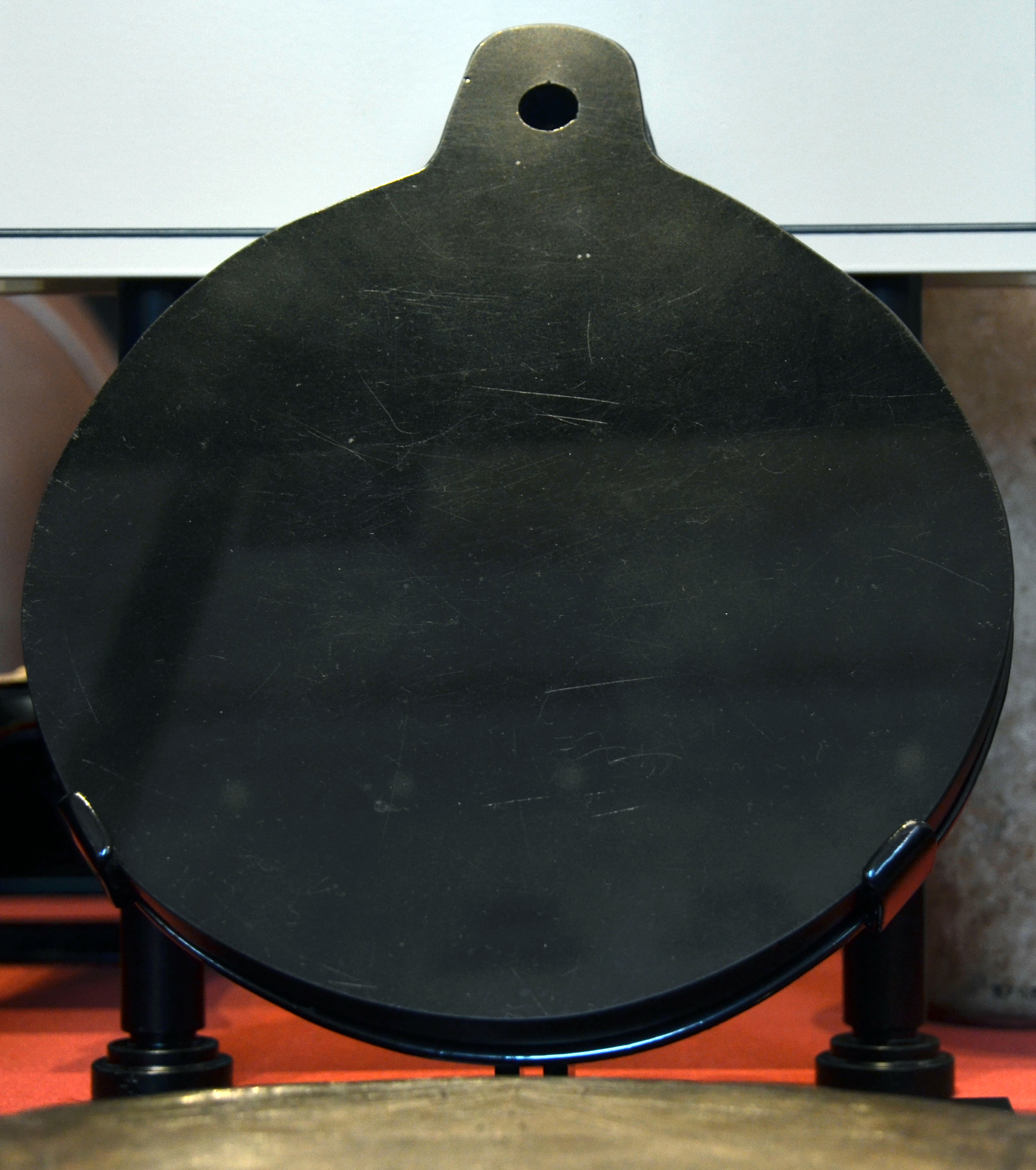
Aztec mirror fashioned from obsidian and used by English alchemist John Dee

The use of mirrors in Mesoamerican culture was associated with the idea that they served as portals to a realm that could be seen but not interacted with. Mirrors in pre-Columbian Mesoamerica were fashioned from stone and served a number of uses, from the decorative to the divinatory. An ancient tradition among many Mesoamerican cultures was the practice of divination using the surface of a bowl of water as a mirror. At the time of the Spanish conquest this form of divination was still practiced among the Maya, Aztecs and Purépecha. In Mesoamerican art, mirrors are frequently associated with pools of liquid; this liquid was likely to have been water. (Note: Healy and Blainey speculate that this liquid may have been mercury. Quantities of liquid mercury ranging from 90 to 684 grams (3.2 to 24.1 oz) have been recovered from elite tombs or ritual caches at six Maya sites. Healy and Blainey 2011, p. 241.)

Early mirrors were fashioned from single pieces of iron ore, polished to produce a highly reflective surface. By the Classic period, mosaic mirrors were being produced from a variety of ores, allowing for the construction of larger mirrors. Mosaic pyrite mirrors were crafted across large parts of Mesoamerica in the Classic period, particularly at Teotihuacan and throughout the Maya region. Pyrite degrades with time to leave little more than a stain on the mirror back by the time it is excavated. This has led to the frequent misidentification of pyrite mirror backs as paint palettes, painted discs or pot lids. By the Postclassic period obsidian mirrors became increasingly common.

== Function and symbolism of mirrors in Mesoamerica ==
Far from being a personal cosmetic accessory, mirrors in Mesoamerica were divinatory aids and also formed a part of elite status costume. Mirrors were viewed as metaphors for sacred caves and as conduits for supernatural forces; they were associated with fiery hearths and pools of water because of their bright surfaces. Mirrors were also closely associated with the sun. Mirrors were often used in pre-Columbian Mexico to reveal a person's destiny through divination. Among the Maya of the Classic period mirrors were a means of communication with otherworld entities, as depicted in scenes painted on ceramic vessels. Otherworld mirrors were believed to be the far side of earthly mirrors, and were owned and used by deities and other supernatural beings. In central Mexico in the Postclassic period, the world was metaphorically conceived as a huge circular mirror.

=== Fire ===
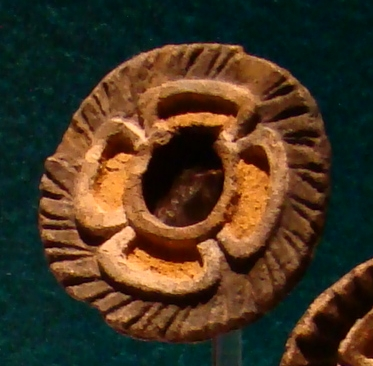
Four petalled flower-mirror with feathered rim from Teotihuacan

Mirrors were associated with fire in Mesoamerica, and representations of mirrors could take the form of flowers and be combined with representations of butterflies. Both butterflies and flowers were associated with fire in central Mexico from the Classic to Postclassic periods, with butterflies representing flames. The Olmecs of the Preclassic period fashioned concave mirrors that were capable of lighting fires.

=== Water ===
Mirrors were also associated with water; an Early Classic mirror in the style of Teotihuacan was excavated at distant Guácimo area of the Limón province near the Caribbean coast of Costa Rica. It included Teotihuacan imagery that was a stylised convention for representing bodies of water. Water imagery continued to be associated with mirrors in central Mexico right up to Aztec times. These representations of water-associated mirrors in Mesoamerican art apparently use the mirror to symbolise the surface of a pool of water. During the Classic Period mirrors were placed in bowls to symbolically represent bowls of water; examples are known from Teotihuacan and throughout the Maya area. Water-filled bowls have been used as mirrors for divinatory purposes right up to modern times in Mesoamerica and the American southwest. An incense burner from Early Classic Escuintla on the Guatemalan Pacific slope combines butterfly and water imagery. The mirror has flanking ears representing the wings of the butterfly that is rising from a water-filled bowl.

=== Jade ===
A painted mural from Teotihuacan, now in the De Young Museum in San Francisco, has a representation of a mirror containing a glyph representing a piece of jade jewellery. Such jade pendants are depicted frequently in Teotihuacan art falling in streams. In the Maya region jade beads were frequently placed alongside mirrors in burials and offerings in the Classic and Postclassic periods. Although jade may have been placed alongside mirrors due to the high value of both to their Mesoamerican owners, it is equally likely that the association of jade with mirrors is due to jade being used in divinatory practices. Like mirrors, jade beads were used for scrying and were invested with supernatural powers. Jade also had an association with water.

=== Eyes and faces ===
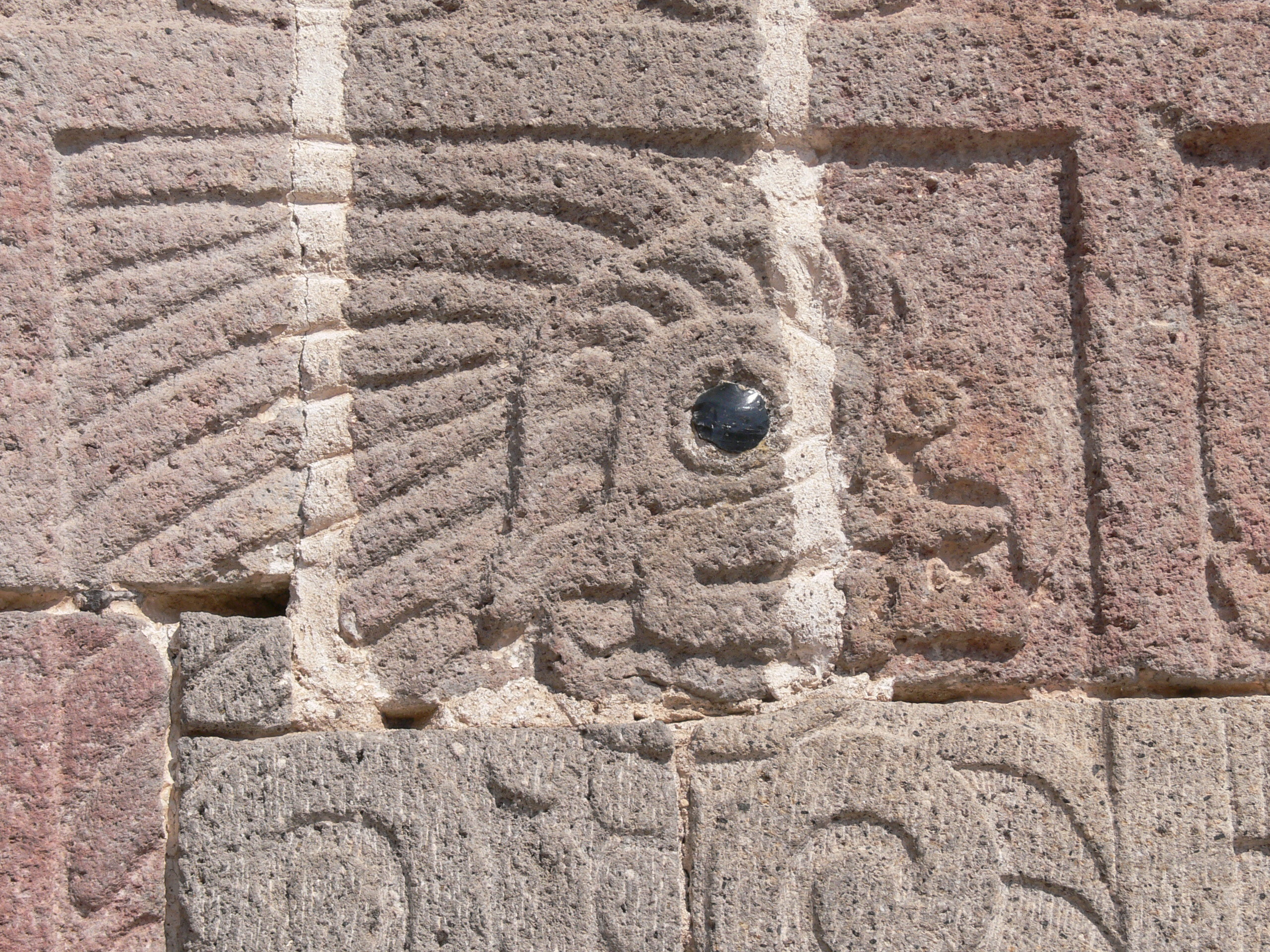
Relief sculpture at Teotihuacan; the eye is marked with obsidian

Representations of mirrors in art from Classic period Teotihuacan and Guatemala's Pacific coastal region depict the mirror face using a glyph in the form of a reptile's eye, the meaning of which is not clear. The ringed eyes of the central Mexican rain god Tlāloc may have represented mirrors from representations at Teotihuacan in the Classic period right through to the Aztecs at the time of Spanish contact. In the Historia General de las Cosas de Nueva España, the Nahuatl word tēzcatl is used to refer to both the eye and mirrors. This association also existed among the Maya, the Tzotzil Maya phrase nen sat is used for the pupil or eye and means literally "mirror of the face" or "mirror of the eye". This association of mirrors with eyes may derive from the highly reflective eyes of the jaguar. Mirror stones were used to represent the eyes in sculptures from many Mesoamerican cultures.

=== Spiders ===
From the Classic period mirrors began to be associated with spider webs, perhaps due to the network of lines on the surface of mosaic mirrors that developed at that time. Imagery associating mirrors with spiders and their webs is relatively frequently encountered at Teotihuacan. The association of mirrors with spiders continued right up to the Postclassic and beyond, with a polished gold Mixtec mirror back taking the form of a spider. The modern Huichol still associate mirrors with spider webs.

=== Sun ===
Mirrors have been identified with the sun in Mesoamerica since the Preclassic period, when the Olmecs associated the two. The Maya maintained the same association throughout the Classic period, and the relationship between mirrors and the sun has persisted into modern times, with the Sierra Totonac of Mexico referring to the sun as Espejo Sol, "Mirror Sun". In the Postclassic period, the turquoise mirrors of the Toltecs and Aztecs represented the sun.

== Mirrors in the Maya region ==
The Maya region of southern Mesoamerica

Mirrors have been found in almost every part of the Maya region, mostly in burials and ritual caches. They have been dated to all periods of Maya civilization from the Middle Preclassic (around 600 BC) right up to the Spanish conquest in the early 1520s. They reached the height of their production and use in the Maya highlands during the Early Classic, while most mirrors from the Maya lowlands date to the Late Classic. Maya mirrors were produced by exceptionally skilled artisans and were highly valued by the Maya elite. Production was likely to have been so specialised that they were made by high-status artisans dedicated to their manufacture, who may have been members of the aristocracy or even royalty. Although hundreds of mirrors have been excavated in the Maya area, comparatively few mosaic mirrors have been recovered from lowland Maya sites. Large quantities of mirrors have been recovered from some highland sites, such as Kaminaljuyu and Nebaj in the Guatemalan Highlands. The high concentration of mirrors in a few highland sites probably indicates centres of production and distribution into the trade network. It is likely that they were manufactured in the highlands and then were traded as finished objects to the Maya lowlands.

Most Maya mirrors were circular with occasional oval and square examples; they range in size from 5.6 to 29 centimetres (2.2 to 11.4 in) across while their thickness ranged from 3 to 72 millimetres (0.12 to 2.83 in). It is likely that the outline of Maya mirrors was initially drawn with an instrument like a compass since many examples are almost perfectly circular. Most Maya mirrors were backed with slate and a few were backed with sandstone or ceramic, some may have been backed with shell. Most mirror backs were plain but a few bear ornately sculpted designs or hieroglyphic text. Some mirrors were framed with wood or bone, or a combination of the two, although these materials are poorly preserved in the archaeological record. Some mirrors bear traces of stucco, which was probably painted, or cinnabar, a red mineral that is often found in association with elite burials in the Maya area. A mirror with hieroglyphic text on the back was excavated from Río Azul in the far north of the Petén Basin of Guatemala. Another mirror from Petén, found at Topoxte, has a circular band of text on the back that includes the phrase u-nen, meaning "his mirror". Mirrors with Maya glyphs on the back have been found as far away as Costa Rica, more than 850 kilometres (530 mi) from the Maya heartland. Polygonal mirror pieces were glued to the backing with an unknown adhesive; on the whole, the iron ore polygons have not survived and have deteriorated to a rust-like residue coating the backing. In some cases ridged deposits of adhesive outline the shape of the vanished polygonal mosaic pieces.

Mirrors excavated from Maya tombs have been found placed near the head, the chest, the small of the back, the groin and the feet of the deceased. A few were placed on the floor of the tomb at some distance from the human remains. In Maya art, mirrors appear to be depicted as hand-held objects; sometimes they are depicted mounted on stands or held by dwarfs or servants in front of elite Maya individuals. Advances in the decipherment of Maya script have revealed the central function of mirrors as instruments for ritual scrying. This ritual scrying was the continuation of an ancient divinatory tradition with its ultimate origins in Preclassic shamanistic practices that had been formalised by the Maya priesthood. Mirrors were of considerable value within Maya society and their use was restricted to the elite.

== History of Mesoamerican mirrors ==
=== Preclassic period ===
Map of the Olmec heartland and other Preclassic sites in southern Mexico

The earliest stone mirrors in Mesoamerica pre-date the rise of the Olmec civilization, with examples being dated as far back as the middle of the 2nd millennium BC. From early in Mesoamerica's history, the use of iron ore mirrors was associated with a hereditary elite class. At Paso de la Amada, a Mokaya site in the Soconusco region of southern Chiapas, iron ore mirrors were excavated that have been dated to between 1400 and 1100 BC. A Mokaya tomb dating to the earlier part of this period was excavated at the Olmec enclave of Cantón Corralito. The tomb contained the remains of an elite status woman accompanied by an adult male and a child; the woman had a large flat iron ore mirror on her chest. At present, it is not known if the remains are those of local Mokoya or of Olmecs from the Gulf coast. About the same time at Tlapacoya in the Valley of Mexico, the Tlatilco culture was using imported mirrors crafted from jade. During the Early and Middle Preclassic periods (approximately 1500 to 500 BC) the Olmecs fashioned mirrors from iron ore, including minerals such as hematite, ilmenite and magnetite. The Olmecs preferred to manufacture concave mirrors; this gave the mirror the properties of reflecting an inverted and reversed image. Larger concave mirrors could be used to light fires. These early mirrors were manufactured from single pieces of stone and were therefore of small size, rarely exceeding 15 centimetres (5.9 in) across. Mirrors were manufactured by using sand or some other abrasive material such as hematite powder to polish the iron ore until it produced a highly reflective surface.

In the Valley of Oaxaca, only San José Mogote has produced evidence of mirror production dating as far back as the Preclassic. Mirrors produced at San José Mogote were distributed to relatively distant places such as Etlatongo and the Olmec city of San Lorenzo. The mirrors from San José Mogote that were excavated at San Lorenzo have been dated to between 1000 and 750 BC. Towards the end of this period, mirror production at San José declined and halted altogether.

The incomplete slate back of the earliest known Maya mirror was excavated from Cahal Pech in Belize; it was dated to around 600 BC, in the Middle Preclassic.

==== Olmecs ====
The first Olmec mirrors were found during archaeological excavations in the early 1940s. A mirror and a mirror fragment were discovered in 1942 during excavations at La Venta directed by Matthew W. Stirling, however, these were not recognised as being mirrors. In 1943 a complete mirror was found and was recognised for what it was. Further finds followed at La Venta, including the excavation of two especially good quality mirrors from offerings in 1945.

Several dozen Olmec iron ore mirrors are known but only a few of these have been recovered in secure archaeological excavations. At the Olmec site of Las Bocas in Puebla, a particularly fine mosaic mirror was recovered that was dated to around 1000 BC. By the Middle Preclassic period the production of high status stone artefacts, including mirrors, was probably already being carried out by specialist artisans. An Olmec mining colony has been identified in the Cintalapa valley. Among items excavated were partially worked blocks of ilmenite and mangnetite and a fragment of mirror, together with tools and San Lorenzo style ceramics. These remains date to around 950 BC. Concave Olmec mirrors were fashioned from a single pied of iron ore. The front, with the mirror face, was concave with a highly polished lens. The bevelled edge of the mirror was convex and the rear and sides of the mirror were roughly sawn or ground down, although there are occasional exceptions. One Olmec mirror had a back that was ground smooth and highly polished. Concave mirrors are depicted in Olmec art, where they are frequently represented as pectorals worn on the chest. They can be divided into two groups; those that have a single drilled hole near the top and those that have at least two drilled holes at the sides. The latter tend to be larger than the former. Most of the mirror stones have been sawn from a larger piece of rock and fashioned into an oval shape; occasionally it is possible to distinguish the original form of the parent stone. The curve of each mirror is unique and tailored to the stone from which it is worked, and none possesses perfect symmetry; this appears to be deliberate. Although the elliptical mirrors are parabolic, the circular mirrors have a spherical concavity. The circular mirrors are effective at lighting fires while the parabolic mirrors are not, although they may have been used to produce smoke. Of four large mirrors found at Arroyo Pesquero in Veracruz, two were circular and were excellent sources of ignition.

Tomb A at La Venta is one of the oldest formal tombs in Mesoamerica, dating to about 600 BC. Among the funerary offerings of this elite burial was a highly polished magnetite mirror; it also contained the figurine of a seated female who wears an obsidian mirror on her chest. A total of seven concave mirrors were excavated from Complex A at La Venta; they were fashioned from hematite, ilmenite and magnetite. These are counted as among the most outstanding examples of iron ore workmanship that the Olmecs produced. Their concave fronts are as precisely ground as modern optical lenses, although their backs were left rough and uneven. The concave lenses of these mirrors were found to form parabolic reflectors. The borders of each of the La Venta mirrors formed a circle or an ellipse, and they usually had different focal lengths for each axis. The three iron ores used are the best available minerals to produce durable highly reflective mirrors with a non-tarnishing metallic surface. All of these mirrors had drilled holes near their edges and were probably worn as chest ornaments since many Olmec figurines depict such mirrors being worn. The concave lenses of some of these iron ore mirrors are able to project camera lucida images onto a flat surface and can also be used to light fires. The grinding of the concave surface was done manually, probably using powdered iron ore as an abrasive. Similar mirrors were not only found at San Lorenzo but also at Río Pesquero and as far as Guerrero on the Pacific Coast of southwestern Mexico. The Olmecs never used iron pyrite in their concave mirrors, presumably because it degrades with time. Mirrors were among the ritual paraphernalia used by Olmec priests, shamans and rulers; the Olmecs closely identified mirrors with the sun.

=== Classic period ===
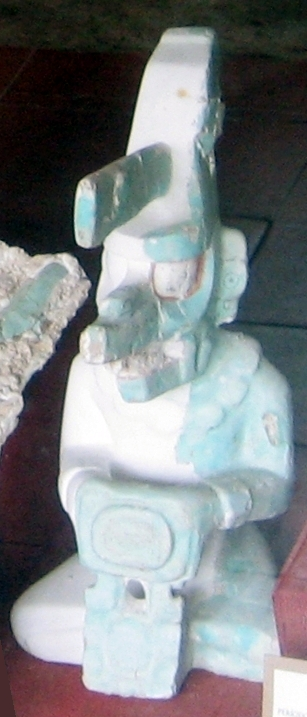
Effigy of the Maya deity K'awiil excavated from Tikal. Stucco over wood. The figure, one of four, supports the representation of a mirror in its hands.

By the Classic period (c.AD 250–900) iron pyrite was the mineral of choice for fashioning mirrors. Instead of crafting the mirror from a single piece of pyrite, pre-cut pieces of pyrite would be fixed to a piece of slate, forming a mosaic mirror fashioned from finely fitted pieces. The slate was often finely sculpted and circular in shape; these mirrors could be much larger than earlier mirrors and mosaic mirrors represented in Mesoamerican art suggest that they may have reached sizes of over 30 centimetres (12 in). Mosaic mirrors using iron pyrite are not well preserved in the archaeological record due to the instability of the mineral, which rapidly oxidises. Usually, these mirrors survive only as the slate backing with a red or yellow stain where the mirror was fitted. This has led to the frequent misidentification of mirror backs as paint palettes, painted discs or pot lids. During the Classic period circular pyrite mirrors were worn over the small of the back by Mesoamerican nobles and they have been found thus positioned in burials dating to the Early Classic (c.AD 250–600) at the great metropolis of Teotihuacan in the Valley of Mexico and at the Maya city of Kaminaljuyu in the Valley of Guatemala. Ceramic incense burner figurines from the Escuintla region of Pacific Guatemala frequently depict the wearing of mirrors upon the chest. The use of mosaic mirrors allowed for a much larger diameter, and mirrors were crafted that were too big to be worn as part of the costume; these mirrors were placed on temple altars and were sometimes held in the arms during rituals. Such mirrors may have measured up to 1 metre (3.3 ft) across.

At the Classic period Zapotec city of Monte Albán in Oaxaca a cache was excavated that contained sixteen figures. Of these, three were holding large discs that have been identified as representations of mirrors.

==== Teotihuacan ====
Mirrors are frequently represented in the iconography of the great city of Teotihuacan in central Mexico. Mirrors in Classic period Teotihuacan, as elsewhere in Mesoamerica, where associated with a corpus of spiritual beliefs, some of which have been passed down to the modern period. Mirrors were fashioned from three different types of stone at Teotihuacan, these were mica, obsidian and iron pyrite. Circular mirrors at Teotihuacan were associated symbolically with eyes and faces, flowers and shields; they are quite frequently encountered during excavations in the ruined city. Iron pyrite mosaic mirrors were fashioned by fixing pieces of pyrite together on a thin disc that was usually crafted from slate. The mirror backing slate was often perforated with two drilled holes and sometimes its reverse was intricately decorated. On the whole, the recovery of mirrors from Teotihuacan has been poorly documented so their archaeological context is unclear.

At Teotihuacan the largest mirrors were worn on the back, mirrors were also frequently worn on belts. Mirrors worn as a part of costume frequently had cloth or feather tassels attached. These costume mirrors were forerunners of the Aztec tezcacuitlapilli, which was a mirror worn on the lower part of the back. A number of mirrors were excavated from the Temple of the Feathered Serpent at Teotihuacan. Fifteen individuals were interred with back mirrors placed at the small of the back in Burial 190 alone. Mirrors were additionally worn upon the chest and the representation of chest mirrors upon ceramic figurines is very common. Additionally, circular mirrors were frequently worn as part of a headdress, usually occupying a central position.

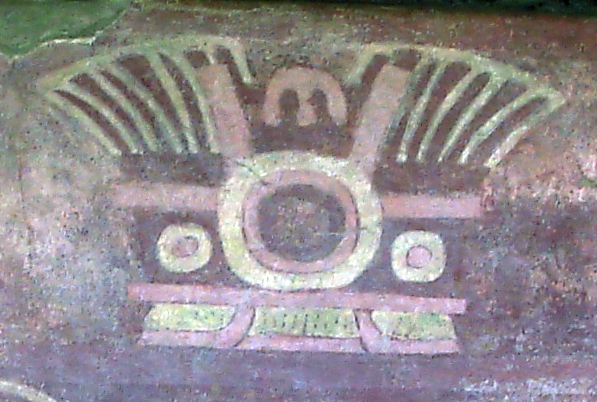
Painted mural at Teotihuacan depicting a headdress with a centrally positioned mirror

Teotihuacan had strong contacts with the distant Maya city of Kaminaljuyu, which covered an area now enveloped by modern Guatemala City. A large quantity of circular pyrite mirrors were excavated from Kaminaljuyu, although their purpose was not recognised by the excavators due to the complete oxidation of the reflective surface. A number of the mirror backs were decorated with scenes in a pure Teotihuacan style. In Teotihuacan art back mirrors are often represented with prominent flares similar to earspools, and a mirror found at Kaminaljuyu had two such jade earspools closely associated with it, although their original position was difficult to determine due to the deterioration of the pyrite mirror face, it is likely they were attached to it in the same way as represented in Teotihuacan art. On some mirrors, these spools were placed near the rim; there are examples both in art and from excavation at Kaminaljuyu, of jade spools being placed in the centre of the mirror.

Circular elements adorned with a feathered border detail are extremely common in the iconography of Teotihuacan and are found in diverse mediums such as ceramics, monumental sculpture, figurines and murals. The feathers are generally raised above the central disc and radiate from the centre. Such discs also appear as costume elements and some of the better preserved ceramic copies of these elements have a central disc crafted from reflective mica. Archaeologist Karl Taube has identified these elements as representations of mirrors in Teotihuacan art. Teotihuacan had a strong influence in the Maya area, and Teotihuacan-mirror imagery appears particularly on Early Classic Maya art that uses the Teotihuacan style. A number of stone beads from the Balsas River Valley in Guerrero were modelled after Teotihuacan mirrors and included small inlaid pieces of iron pyrite to represent the face of the mirror.

===== Symbolic meaning of mirrors at Teotihuacan =====
Mirrors had a great many symbolic associations at Teotihuacan; they could represent human eyes, faces, caves, passageways, spider webs, flowers, shields, the sun, a fiery hearth or the world as a whole. The association of the human eye with mirrors was so strong that stylised eyes were frequently used in Teotihuacan art as a substitute for the face of a mirror. Mirrors could also be replaced by an entire face, rather than just an eye, reflecting widespread practice in Mesoamerica. Sometimes mirrors were fashioned so the rim resembled petals of a flower, with the mirror face the centre. In art, representations of butterflies were sometimes positioned as if they were feeding from the mirror-flower. Sometimes metaphors could be combined in imagery, so that the mirror-flower was worked in such a way as to also resemble a face. Both flowers and butterflies were associated with fire at Teotihuacan, with butterflies symbolising flames. At the same time, the face of the mirror symbolised fire. One mirror in the Teotihuacan style has a representation of a goddess on the back that is flanked by pairs of burning torches; fire signs cover her body.

A Teotihuacan-style mirror excavated in Costa Rica was decorated with iconography that, at Teotihuacan, symbolically represented bodies of water. The association of mirrors with water in central Mexican art persisted right up to Aztec times. In Teotihuacan art mirrors were relatively frequently shown standing upright in bowls, symbolising bowls of shining water. The composite surface of circular pyrite mosaic mirrors led to their association with spider webs. A scene depicted at Teotihuacan shows a mirror covered with a net and flanked by a waterlily and a cotton plant, symbolising water and weaving respectively. The spider webs on mirrors can sometimes be realistically represented in Teotihuacan art, sometimes including a spider in the design. This also fed back into imagery of spider webs themselves, which could be represented by the depiction of a mirror. A mural at the Tetitla compound of Teotihuacan depicts a spider-woman deity standing in a mirror-bowl.

Mirrors were so closely associated with shields at Teotihuacan that it is difficult to distinguish the two in Teotihuacan art. Both shields and mirrors were circular with a raised rim decorated with feathers. Teotihuacan shields frequently had central tassels that resembled the central spool found on some Teotihuacan mirrors. Mirrors worn on the back and the chest could have served a dual protective function, deflecting physical blows as well as supernatural attacks. The mirror itself may have symbolised war in Teotihuacan; the combination of its association with fire and water may have been a precursor of the Aztec atl-tlachinolli, Nahuatl for "water-fire", the phrase that the Aztecs used for war.

==== Classic Maya ====
Among the Maya of the Classic period mirrors were fashioned from solid pieces of hematite or mosaics of iron pyrite. They tended to be larger than earlier Olmec mirrors and were mounted on a slate backing that was often drilled with holes, indicating that they were attached to another object; either mounted on a wooden frame or worn with clothing. Hundreds of such mirrors have been recovered from archaeological sites in the Maya region. Such mirrors have been excavated from royal burials throughout the Maya area, with the greatest quantity of mirrors being recovered from Altun Ha in Belize. In Piedras Negras, on the Guatemalan side of the Usumacinta River, a sizeable iron pyrite mirror was set at an angle within the tomb of king K'inich Yo'nal Ahk II in such a way that the deceased king would theoretically be able to view himself laid out in his tomb. The tomb of his successor, Ruler 4, also contained a mirror; it bore the image of an important war captive. At Bonampak in Chiapas, a mirror was interred at the feet of the deceased. In all these cases it is likely that the mirror was installed in the tomb in order to open a supernatural location within it. Among the Classic Maya, mirrors were considered to be used jointly by gods and mortals, as evidenced by scenes painted on polychrome ceramic vases.

Mirror production continued in Belize during the Classic period. At Pacbitun in Belize, near to where the earliest known Maya slate mirror back was found, considerable evidence was found of Late Classic slate working. Archaeological investigation of one of the rapidly abandoned buildings of the Late Classic royal palace at Aguateca in the Petexbatún region produced 300 pyrite and indicates the likely presence of a mirror workshop within the royal court. The structure in question was apparently the residence of an elite status courtier. Several Early Classic mirrors from Copán in Honduras had stuccoed backs that were painted with motifs in the style of distant Teotihuacan. A mirror back from Kaminaljuyu sculpted with an ornate volute design apparently derived from the Classic period culture of Veracruz on the coast of the Gulf of Mexico. Pyrite mirrors at Kaminaljuyu were placed upon the small of the back of two individuals in Early Classic tomb B-1. The mirrors were placed with the reflective surface facing up, even though one of them had a finely sculpted back in the Veracruz style, demonstrating that it was the mirror surface itself that was the display surface even when the back was a work of art in itself. Large mirrors were also placed upon the chest of the deceased at Kaminaljuyu. A broken half of an Early Classic mirror from Zaculeu in the Guatemalan Highlands had a border formed by six curved iron pyrite plates, very similar to representations of mirrors in Teotihuacan art. Pyrite mirrors from Nebaj and Zaculeu were found placed in Early Classic censers, suggesting the same association between mirrors and fire as was found at Teotihuacan. Two Early Classic style Maya mirrors were traded as far away as Costa Rica.

===== Mirrors in Classic Maya art =====
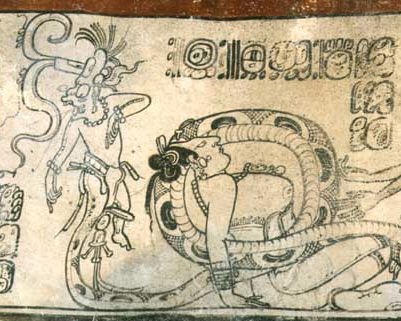
K'awiil as represented on a Maya vase (figure at left). On his forehead he has a mirror penetrated by an axe or other instrument

Maya mirrors and their use are depicted on Classic Maya polychrome ceramics, where pictorial vases frequently depict scenes from courtly life. One vase depicts an anthropomorphic dog staring into the depths of a vase, behind the vase an anthropomorphic monkey dances while staring into a mirror held up in one hand. Another vase has a scene involving a group of elderly gods; one of these is applying makeup while using a mirror held up to his face by a female helper. This scene is unlikely to represent the application of cosmetics in a modern sense, since the reflection provided by an iron ore mosaic mirror was unlikely to be of great use due to the distorted image it presented. Instead, the deity is likely to be ritually transforming himself into the dark face of the mirror by applying dark paint. An important vase from Chama near Nebaj, in the highlands, shows a Maya lord communicating with a rabbit spirit through a mirror, demonstrating the mirror's importance as a portal between worlds. The rabbit spirit is talking to the lord, with its speech scroll passing directly over the mirror. These scenes appear to represent what the Maya believed was happening on the other side of the surface of their mirrors. Although mirrors are represented on ceramics, mirrors rarely appear on publicly visible art, such as Maya stelae or openly visible Maya architecture.

Tikal Stela 31 includes mirror imagery in the Teotihuacan warrior garb of king Yax Nuun Ayiin depicted on its sides. Here the king wears a back mirror; the left hand side of the stela displays the face of the mirror and its rim while the right hand side shows the back of the mirror with lines near the edge of the mirror's disk that probably represent cord threaded through drilled holes to bind it to the king's costume. This stela was erected in AD 445. A back mirror is represented on Late Classic Stela 11 from Yaxchilan on the Mexican bank of the Usumacinta River. In this representation the mirror has a central spool with attached tassel similar to Early Classic mirrors and their representations from Teotihuacan and Kaminaljuyu. Acanceh is an Early Classic Maya site in Yucatán that also displays the influence of Teotihuacan. Five stucco figures at the site wear back mirrors in the Teotihuacan style.

The Classic period Maya god K'awiil was closely associated with mirrors and often served as an interlocutor between humans and divine beings. This deity was represented with one leg in the form of a serpent and a mirror on the forehead that was penetrated by an axe or celt and emitted either flames or smoke. K'awiil was a deity who was associated with Maya divine kingship and the royal lineage and bears attributes that were later inherited by the Aztec Tezcatlipoca, or "Smoking Mirror". Four Late Classic sculptures of K'awiil were excavated from Burial 195 at Tikal, in each the deity grasps a mirror in its outheld hands.

=== Postclassic period ===
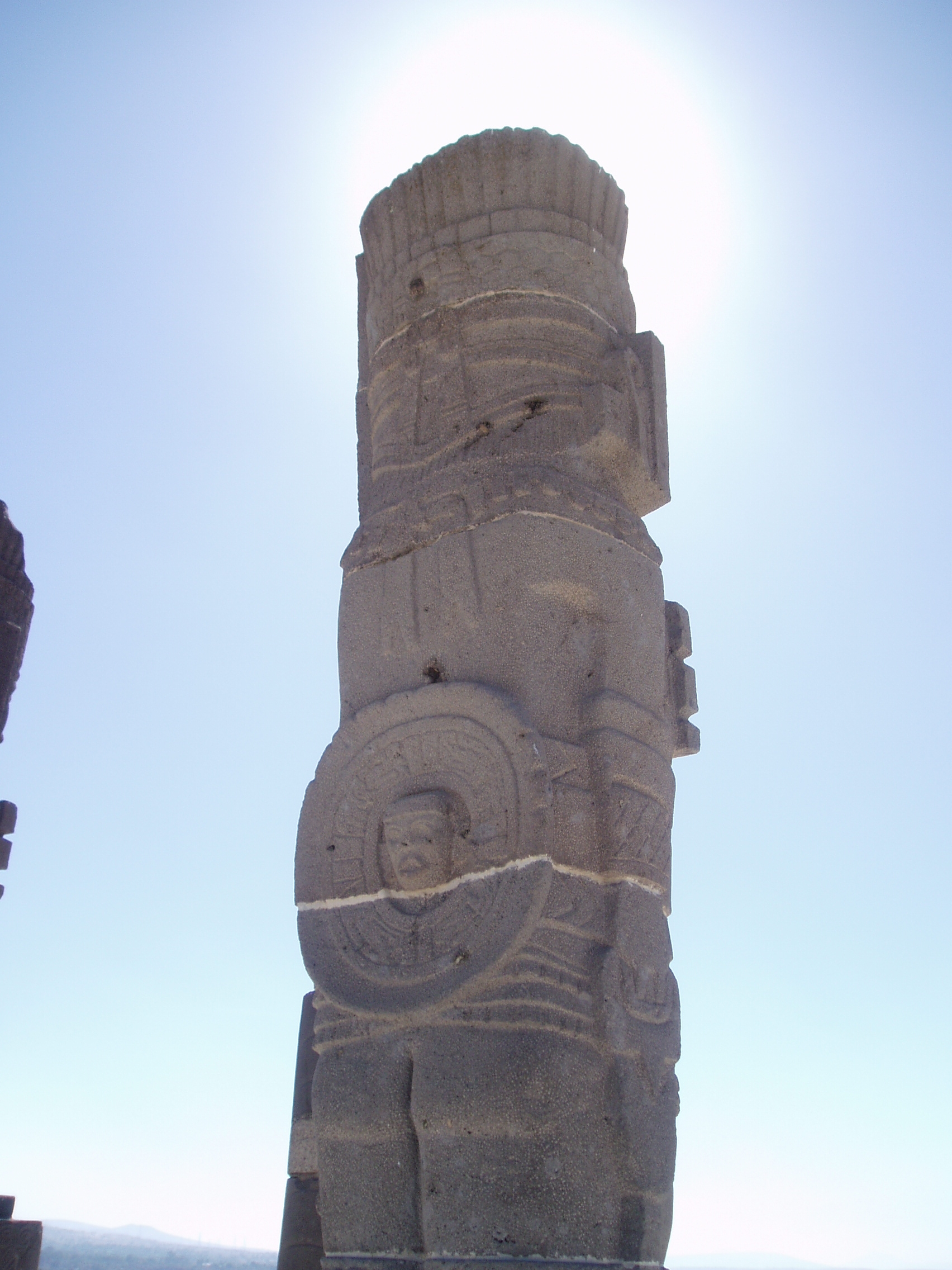
The back of a Toltec atlante at Tula, showing the sculpted back mirror

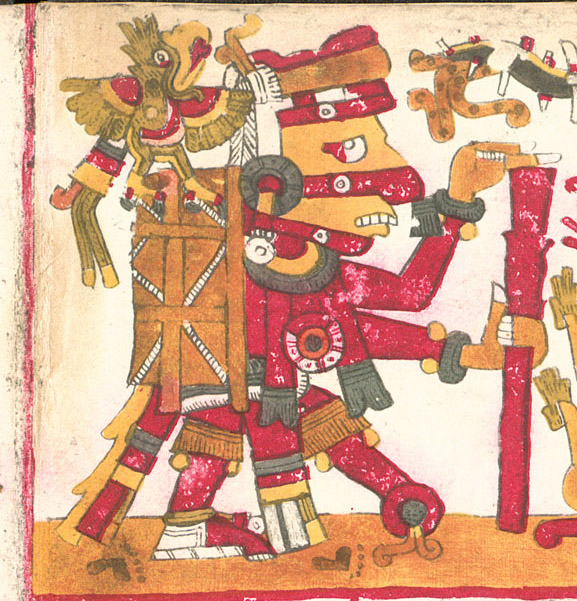
The Aztec deity Tezcatlipoca ("Smoking Mirror") as depicted in the Codex Borgia. At lower right one of his feet is replaced with a smoking mirror.

In the Postclassic period (c.AD 900–1521) mirrors continued to be worn over the back in Central Mexico; they were called tezcacuitlapilli in the Nahuatl language of the Aztecs. Metal mirrors appear in the Postclassic period; a gold mirror back in the form of a spider was excavated from Tomb 7 at Monte Alban in Oaxaca. This mirror was the product of Mixtec artisans.

==== Toltecs ====
During the Early Postclassic (c.900–1200) the Toltec inhabitants of Tula in Central Mexico favoured a back mirror in the form of a central disc crafted from iron pyrite surrounded by representations of the Xiuhcoatl fire-serpent depicted with mosaicwork fashioned from turquoise. This form of Mesoamerican mirror was widely distributed during the Early Postclassic, with examples being reported from Chichen Itza in the northern Yucatán Peninsula and from Casas Grandes in Chihuahua. It is probable that these Toltec mirrors were identified as representations of the sun.

The atlante columns at Tula have representations of mirrors sculpted on their backs with four smoking serpents, one in each quadrant. The faces of the mirror are replaced with human faces on all of them, corresponding to the close association between faces and mirrors across Mesoamerica.

==== Aztecs ====
In the Late Postclassic (c. 1200–1521) obsidian came to be the stone of preference for fashioning mirrors in Central Mexico. Broken pieces of raw obsidian were likely to have been used as mirrors as far back as the Preclassic but obsidian was not commonly ground and polished to manufacture mirrors until this period. Obsidian mirrors were used ritually to spiritually access the Aztec underworld and communicate with the realm of the dead. The name of the important Aztec deity Tezcatlipoca means "Smoking Mirror" and he was apparently the supernatural embodiment of a polished obsidian mirror. Depictions of the god frequently replace one of his feet with a smoking mirror and position another at the back of his head. Spanish chronicler Diego Durán described the image of Tezcatlipoca in the Great Temple of Tenochtitlan as being fashioned from polished obsidian and bearing a mirror of polished gold. The deity was supposed to observe everything that happened in the world through his mirror. The obsidian mirror was a metaphor for rulership and power among the Aztecs. Aztec rulers used a double-sided obsidian mirror to oversee their subjects; by gazing into one side the ruler could see how his subjects were comporting themselves and in the other side his subjects could see themselves reflected back. The gods were said to reveal their wishes to a ruler through the use of a mirror.

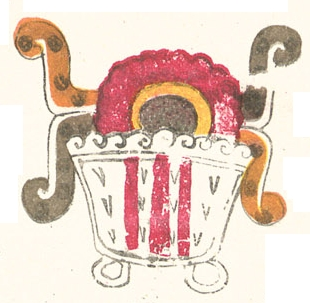
A burning mirror in a brazier as depicted on page 63 of the Codex Borgia

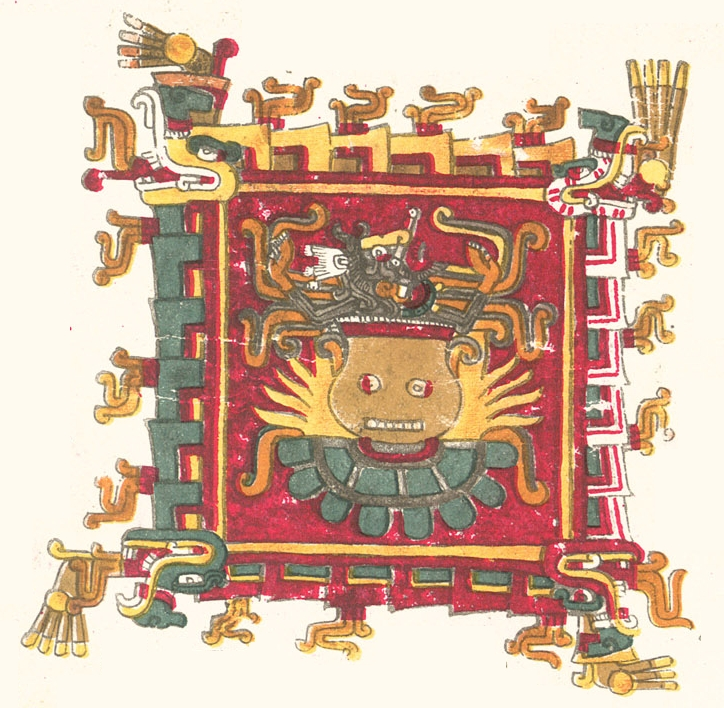
A Toltec mirror used as a hearth on page 46 of the Codex Borgia

An Aztec hemispherical iron pyrite mirror in the collection of the Musée de l'Homme in Paris has a sculpted representation of the wind god Ehecatl on its convex back. Xipe Totec, "Our Lord the Flayed One", was the Aztec god of rebirth. One of his names was Tlatlauquitzezcatl, meaning "Red Mirror" or "Mirror of Fiery Brightness". The Aztec Emperor Moctezuma II was said to have seen the overthrow of his empire in a mirror; some fishermen caught a strange bird with a mirror on its forehead. They brought the bird before their emperor, who peered into the mirror and saw warriors mounted on deer. (Note: Horses were unknown in Mesoamerica before the arrival of the Spanish. In native accounts they were usually described as deer.) This purported incident was described by Franciscan friar Bernardino de Sahagún in his Historia de las cosas de Nueva España ("History of the things of New Spain"):

The seventh sign or omen is that waterbird hunters caught a brown bird the size of a crane, and they brought it to Moctezuma to show him, he was in the room they call Tlillancalmecac. It was after midday. This bird had on its forehead a round mirror in which could be seen the sky and stars, especially the Mastelejos near the Pleiades. Moctezuma was afraid when he saw this, and the second time he looked into the mirror that the bird had, there he saw nearby a crowd of people gathered who came mounted on horses. And Moctezuma then called his augurs and diviners and he asked them "Don't you know what this means? That many people are coming." And before the diviners could reply, the bird disappeared, and they said nothing.

— Bernardino de Sahagún, Historia de las cosas de Nueva España, Book 12, Chapter 1

Aztec mirrors were originally held in wooden frames and were decorated with perishable ornaments such as feathers. Mirrors were among the gifts that Hernán Cortés sent back to the royal court in Spain and they became widely collected among the European aristocracy. One such mirror was acquired by Elizabeth I's court astrologer John Dee and is now in the collection of the British Museum.

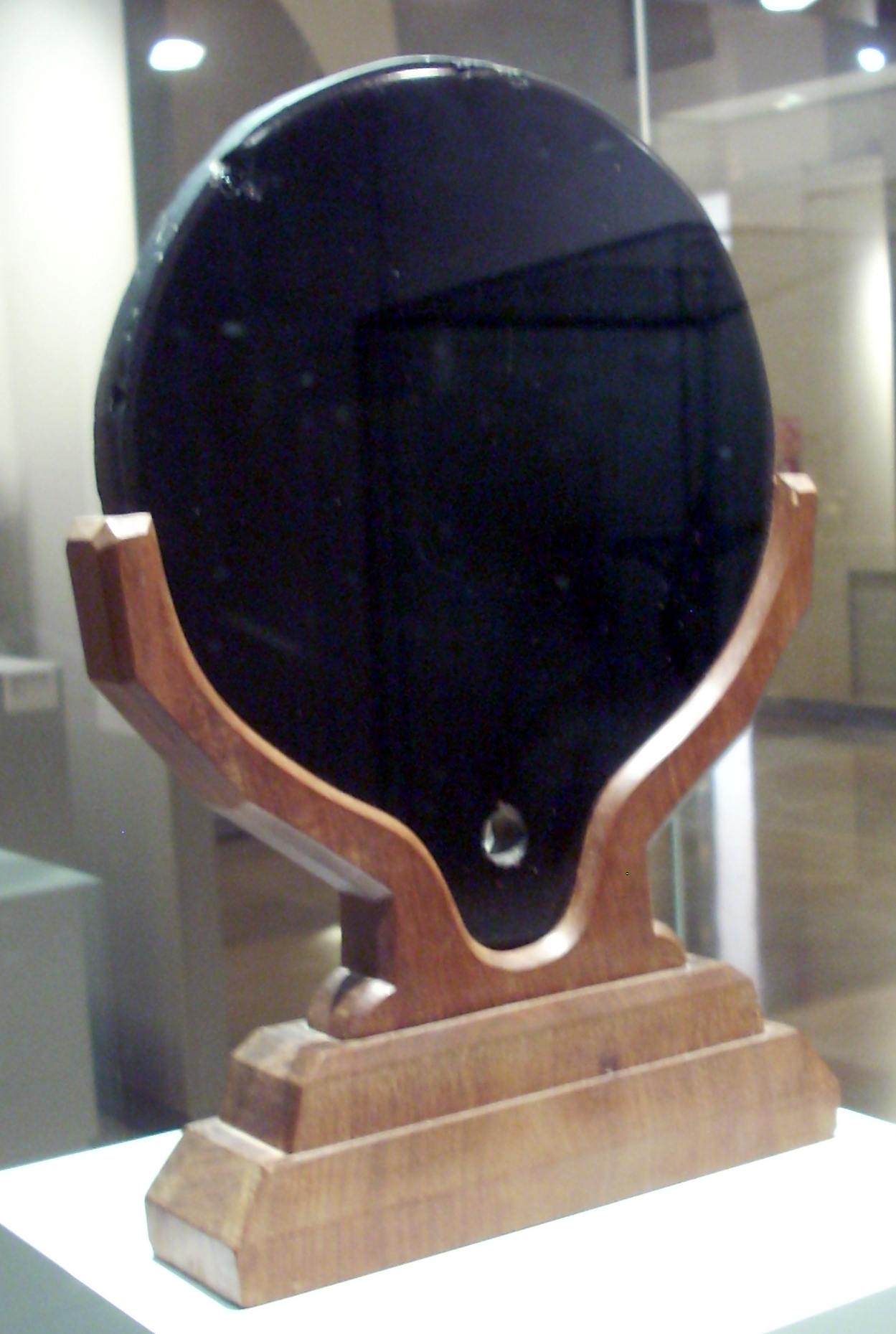
Obsidian Aztec mirror in the Museo de América in Madrid

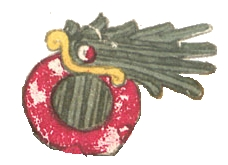
Tezcatlipoca's head-mirror from page 17 of the Codex Borgia, with the symbol atl, meaning "water"

Mirrors are represented in association with fire in two codices of the Borgia Group from central Mexico during the Aztec period (Codex Borgia and Codex Vaticanus B). The mirrors are placed with censers that serve as hearths for the fire goddess Chantico. Another scene from the Codex Borgia depicts a burning Toltec-style mirror used as a hearth for a sizeable pot. The mirror-hearth and pot are framed by four fire serpents. On another page of the same codex, the god of fire Xiuhtecuhtli is making fire from a mirror placed on the back of a fire serpent. An Aztec sculpture of a seated figure bears a smoking mirror on its back to represent the fifth sun. The iconography of the Aztec sun stone closely conforms to that of Postclassic turquoise mirrors; and is based upon the design of earlier Toltec pyrite mirrors.

Bowls of water were used as mirrors to examine the reflections of sick children. If the child's reflection was dark then his soul, or tonalli in Nahuatl, had escaped from his body. The association between mirrors and water was also present in Aztec art; page 17 of the Codex Borgia depicts Tezcatlipoca with a water-filled mirror placed at the back of his head instead of the more customary smoking mirror. The day sign for water, Atl, is placed upon the mirror.

==== Postclassic Maya ====
Hematite mirror fragments were excavated from the ruins of a ceremonial hall in the Kowoj Maya city of Zacpeten, dating from a time when the Kowoj were already in contact with the Spanish, since European artefacts were also recovered. One Postclassic mirror, and possibly more, from Lamanai in Belize was set in an unusual ceramic frame. Maya books dating from the time of first contact with the Spanish suggest that mirrors were worn on the back or shoulder.

=== Modern Mesoamerica ===
Both the Huichol and Totonac associate mirrors with the sun, with Sierra Totonac referring to it as Espejo Sol, or Sun Mirror. In modern Nahua tradition, the sky is regarded as a living crystal mirror.

==== Huichol ====
The Huichol people of the western Mexican state of Nayarit have a considerable body of native lore regarding mirrors. They use mirrors, referred to as nierika by shamans, to carry out their “gift of seeing.” They view mirrors as supernatural portals between them and their ancestors and link them symbolically with the sun, moon, eyes, faces, caves, fire and flowers, much like at Teotihuacan during the Classic period. Nierika does not necessarily refer only to mirrors; it also refers to objects used in the same manner, such as disks decorated with colorful yarn or beads, prayer arrows, and other crafts. The word nierika, or nealika, has had various meanings attributed to it, such as "face," "gift of seeing," and "clear vision." They are also referred to as "front shields," although they are not used for protection. The regular word for mirror in the Huichol language is xikiri, referring to objects that are shiny and transparent. Before mirrors were available in stores, the Huichol used quartz, water, or white stones called ututame to look at themselves; they were not necessarily used for ritualistic purposes.

The Huichol use circular glass mirrors for divination, believing that shamans are able to see the world of the gods through them. Shamans will use a small mirror to examine their patient, and then with their nierika will be visited by an ancestor in their dreams to determine the cause of a disease. The mirrors can similarly be used on ceremonial objects to observe the ancestors that are represented on it. In addition to using the small mirrors by themselves, the mirrors can be placed on a god disk. God disks can be made out of stone, wood, clay, or bamboo. Wax is placed on top of them and they are decorated with yarn. In the center there can be a hole or a mirror representing the "eye of the god" that links the world of the humans with the world of their ancestors. Four more mirrors, or other symbols, can be placed on the disk to form a quincunx. These mirrors are occasionally used in commercial yarn paintings. The disks can be left as offerings or taken on peyote pilgrimages. Before conducting ceremonies with the peyote, pilgrims will paint their faces using a mirror.

In modern Huichol lore, the first nealika seeing-instrument was formed by a spider-web across a gourd bowl. In Huichol mythology, fire first appeared as a mirror.
