= Yalain =

Postclassic Maya people

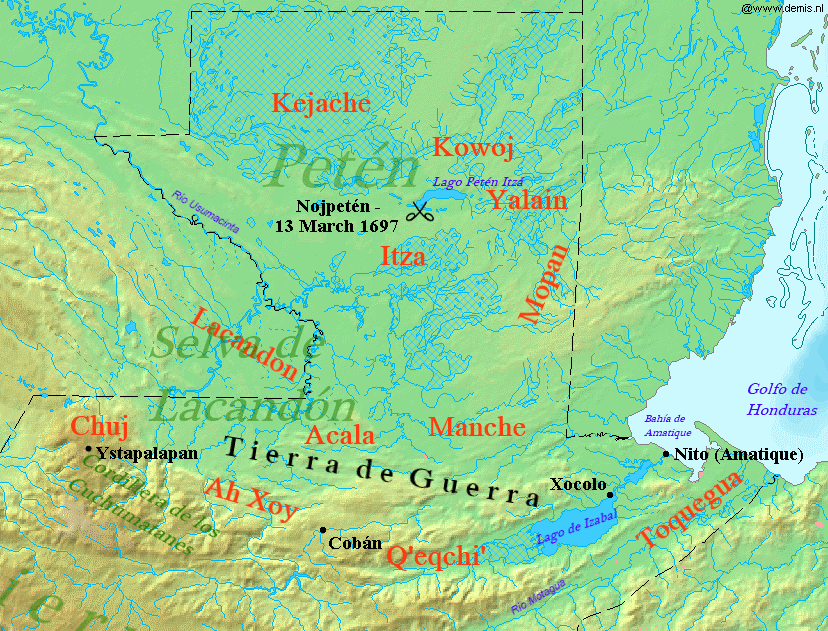
Map of the northern Guatemalan lowlands at the time of Spanish contact

The Yalain have been proposed as a Maya polity that existed during the Postclassic period (c. AD 1000–1697) in the Petén Basin of northern Guatemala, based in the central Petén lakes region. A small town called Yalain was described in 1696 by the Franciscan friar Andrés de Avendaño y Loyola. It was said to consist of a relatively small number of residences clustered within rich agricultural land. The town was located to the east of Lake Petén Itzá and was said to have been farmed by the inhabitants of Nojpetén, the capital city of the Itza kingdom. The political extent and archaeology of the Yalain is poorly understood.

== Proposed territory ==
The existence of the Yalain was first proposed by Grant D. Jones. Jones suggested that their territory was based around the town of the same name on the shores of Lake Macanché and extended eastwards into the drainage of the Yaxhá and Sacnab lakes. This area was formerly Kowoj territory and was aggressively occupied by the Itza in the 1630s. Don and Prudence Rice have disputed the location of the Yalain capital being so far east on the basis that it would be too far for the inhabitants of Nojpetén to tend their fields. They suggest an alternative location on the small southern arm of Lake Petén Itza itself. Jones later questioned the independent existence of the Yalain and considered them to be either allies or vassals of the Itza, and best described as a part of the Itza polity. The Yalain polity was under Itza control when the Spanish invaded Petén in 1697, at which time it was ruled by Aj Chan, the son of the sister of the king of the Itza. Don and Prudence Rice have argued that there is sufficient evidence that the Yalain should not be considered identical to the Itza and that the prospective Yalain polity remains plausible.

Analysis of baptismal records following the Spanish conquest of the Petén lakes in 1697 has revealed that, although there is some overlap with the surnames of the Itza who were located to the south and west, the overlap is not total. Both the Itza and the proposed Yalain surname groups are distinct from those surnames recorded from the area of the Kowoj, with comparatively little overlap.

== History ==
The Yalain appear to have been one of the three dominant polities in Postclassic central Petén, alongside the Kowoj and the Itza. At its height, this territory would have extended from the eastern shore of Lake Petén Itzá to Tipuj in Belize. The site of Muralla de León, to the east of Lake Macanché, may have been an early capital of the Yalain.

In the 17th century the Yalain capital was located at the site of that name on the north shore of Lake Macanché. In the late 17th century, Spanish colonial records document hostilities between Maya groups in the lakes region, with the incursion of the Kowoj into Zacpeten on Lake Macanché and Ixlu on Lake Salpetén. Archaeological investigations have revealed that these areas were previously occupied by a different ethnic group, who continued inhabiting the area after Kowoj achieved dominance of the region. At the time of Spanish contact the Yalain were allied with the Itza, an alliance cemented by intermarriage between the elites of both groups. The Itza used the Yalain as an eastern buffer against Spanish approach from the Belize.

=== Spanish conquest ===
When the Spanish conquered the Petén lakes in 1697 under the command of Martín de Urzúa y Arizmendi, the Yalain were initially cooperative and assisted in the capture of the king of the Itza. At this time Yalain was ruled by Chamach Xulu. The Yalain leadership encouraged Christian conversion as a means of maintaining peace with the occupying Spanish forces. As time went on, Yalain cooperation with the Spanish appears to have decreased. Soon after the conquest, the Yalain fled their settlements to avoid foraging Spanish parties that were abducting Maya women for "service" at their barracks. At this time, such was the hostility that was felt towards the occupying forces that the inhabitants of the Yalain settlements preferred to burn their fields and break all their pottery rather than leave anything for the Spanish. The Yalain capital is recorded as having been burned in 1698.

== Yalain architecture ==
The area within the proposed Yalain polity includes a distinct architectural pattern, principally found at the ruins of Yalain itself and at Ixlu. The Yalain pattern consists of three small C-shaped structures that are arranged end-to-end along one side of a plaza. They face across the plaza to a larger structure in the form of an open hall. A small shrine is situated in the centre of the plaza. At Yalain itself this shrine contained the remains of Late Classic Maya stelae set into the walls of the platform. Although architecture west of Ixlu also includes architectural elements similar to those of the Yalain, the Yalain arrangement has not been found around the western end of Lake Petén Itza or further west. At Ixlu the Yalain pattern coexists with distinctive Kowoj architectural arrangements in other parts of the city, perhaps reflecting the contested nature of the site.

=== Yalain archaeological site ===
The site of Yalain, which has given its name to the polity, is located approximately 300 metres (980 ft) from the shore on the northwest side of Lake Macanche. It is believed to correspond to the settlement of Ah K'in Kan Te' referred to in Spanish colonial documents. The site contains a number of small residential groups that have been dated to the Classic (c. AD 250–900) and Postclassic periods. The site core is dominated by a 95 by 70 metres (312 by 230 ft) plaza oriented north–south.
