= List of islands of Guatemala =

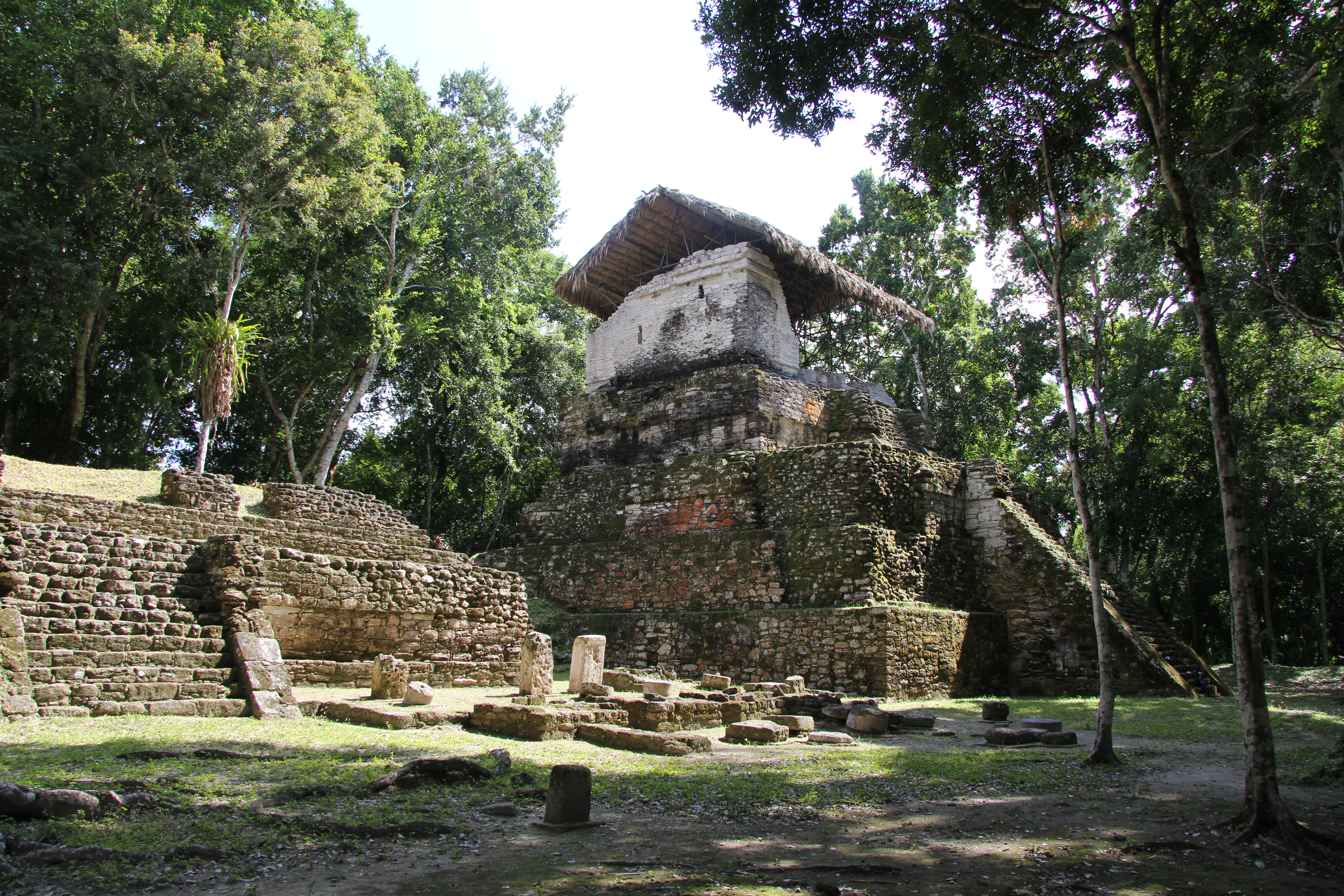
Mayan buildings on Topoxte island.

The following is a list of the islands of Guatemala.

== Bahia de Amatique ==
- La Graciosa Island
- Cayos del Diablo
- Several very small islands

== Pacific Ocean ==
- Several very small islands

== Inland islands ==
- El Golfete
  - Corsaria Island
  - Cayo Julio
  - Cayo Grande
  - Cayo Palomo
  - Cuatro Cayos
- Lake Yaxhá
  - Canté
  - Paxté
  - Topoxte
- Lake Petén Itzá
  - Flores
  - La Garrucha Island
  - Santa Bárbara Islet
  - El Hospital Islet
  - El Petencito
  - Pedregal Islet
  - Lepete
- Lake Atitlán
  - Isla de los Gatos

== See also ==
- Geography of Guatemala
