= María de la Cruz Paillés =

Mexican archaeologist (1941–2020)

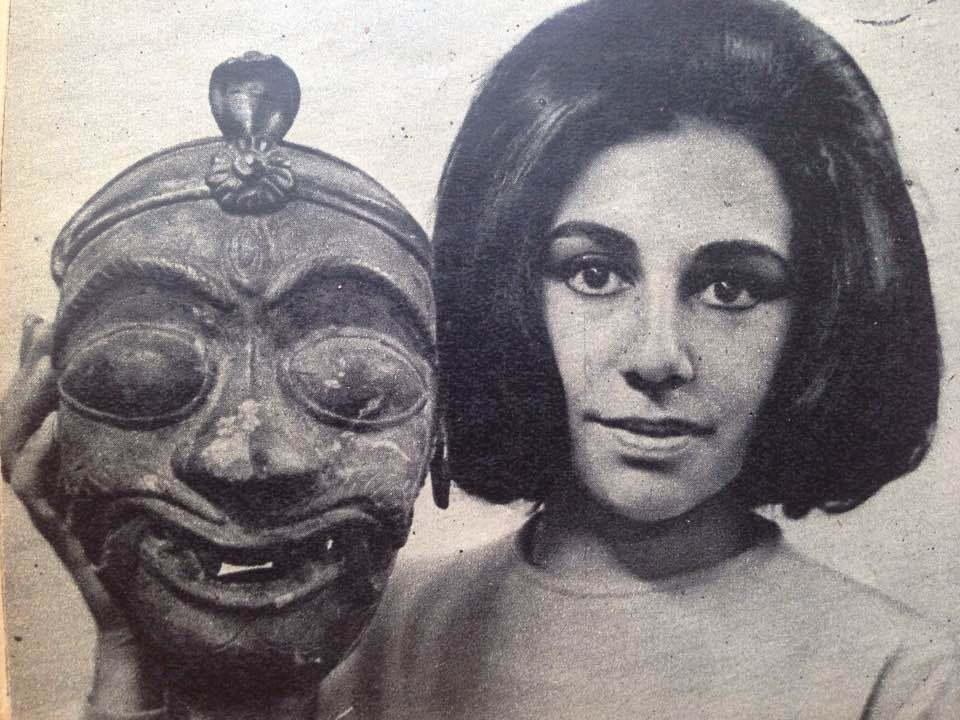
- María de la Cruz Paillés in October 1963
- Born: 20 November 1941
- Died: 27 July 2020 (aged 78)
- Education: National School of Anthropology and History; National Autonomous University of Mexico
- Known for: Studies on Mesoamerican Preclassic period cultures
- Scientific career
- Fields: Pre-Columbian archaeology and anthropology
- Workplaces: Instituto Nacional de Antropología e Historia

María de la Cruz Paillés Hernández (20 November 1941 – 27 July 2020) was a Mexican archaeologist, recognised for her studies on Mesoamerican Preclassic period cultures.

Her most renowned works are the excavations at pre-Columbian archaeological sites of Izapa and Las Bocas in Mexico.

== Early life and education ==
Paillés was born on 20 November 1941.

She graduated from the National School of Anthropology and History (ENAH) and obtained a master's degree in anthropology and a doctorate in history from the National Autonomous University of Mexico (UNAM).

== Career ==
Her most notable and enduring work was carried out in the archaeological zone of Izapa in Chiapas, a crucial ceremonial centre that served as a cultural link between the Olmec and early Maya cultures. Paillés devoted decades to its study, directing numerous field seasons. Her most valuable contribution was the creation of the most complete and detailed topographical map of the site, documenting more than 160 mounds and structures, which remains an indispensable tool for research. Under her direction, numerous structures were excavated and consolidated, which today form part of the area open to the public.

Paillés carried out important archaeological research at the Las Bocas site in Puebla, known for its production of fine Olmec-style pottery and figurines. Her work there was crucial in establishing a scientific chronology for the site following the intense looting of the 1960s.

She also led other archaeological projects such as El Pajón and Mango Amate.

In the 1970s and 1990s, Paillés was the director of the Instituto Nacional de Antropología e Historia (INAH) centres in Chiapas and Morelos. She later also held institutional positions as president of the College of Archaeologists of Mexico between 1997 and 1999, which she was one of the founders, and of the National Academy of Archaeology of the Mexican Society of Geography and Statistics between 2003 and 2017. Paillés was also the national coordinator of the Scientific Committee for Archaeological Heritage of the International Council on Monuments and Sites.

She was also curator of several galleries at the National Museum of Anthropology.

Paillés died on 27 July 2020 at the age of 78.

== Selected publications ==
- Las Bocas, Puebla: a Preclassic village in the central highlands of Mexico. (2008). National Institute of Anthropology and History. Mexico.
- Barlow, Robert H., Sources and studies on indigenous Mexico. Part One: Generalities and Central Mexico, (Jesús Monjarás-Ruiz, Elena Limón and María de la Cruz Paillés) (1994). INAH, University of the Americas Puebla
- Palenque in the 18th century, first expeditions of the Spanish Crown: Joseph Antonio Calderón and Antonio Bernasconi. (1993). National Museum of Archaeology and Ethnology, Guatemala.
