= La Sufricaya =

Archaeological site

La Sufricaya is an archaeological site of the pre-Columbian Maya civilization, located in the Petén Basin region of present-day Guatemala. The site is situated approximately 1.2 km (0.75 mi) west of the site of Holmul, and the relationship between these two sites during the Classic period occupations is a main focus of ongoing investigations.

Teotihuacano-style imagery found on stelae and murals at the site are suggestive of foreign (i.e., non-Maya) presence, or even occupation, although much of the site's extent and historical relationships are yet to be fully excavated and analysed.
