= Pacbitun =

Maya archaeological site in Belize

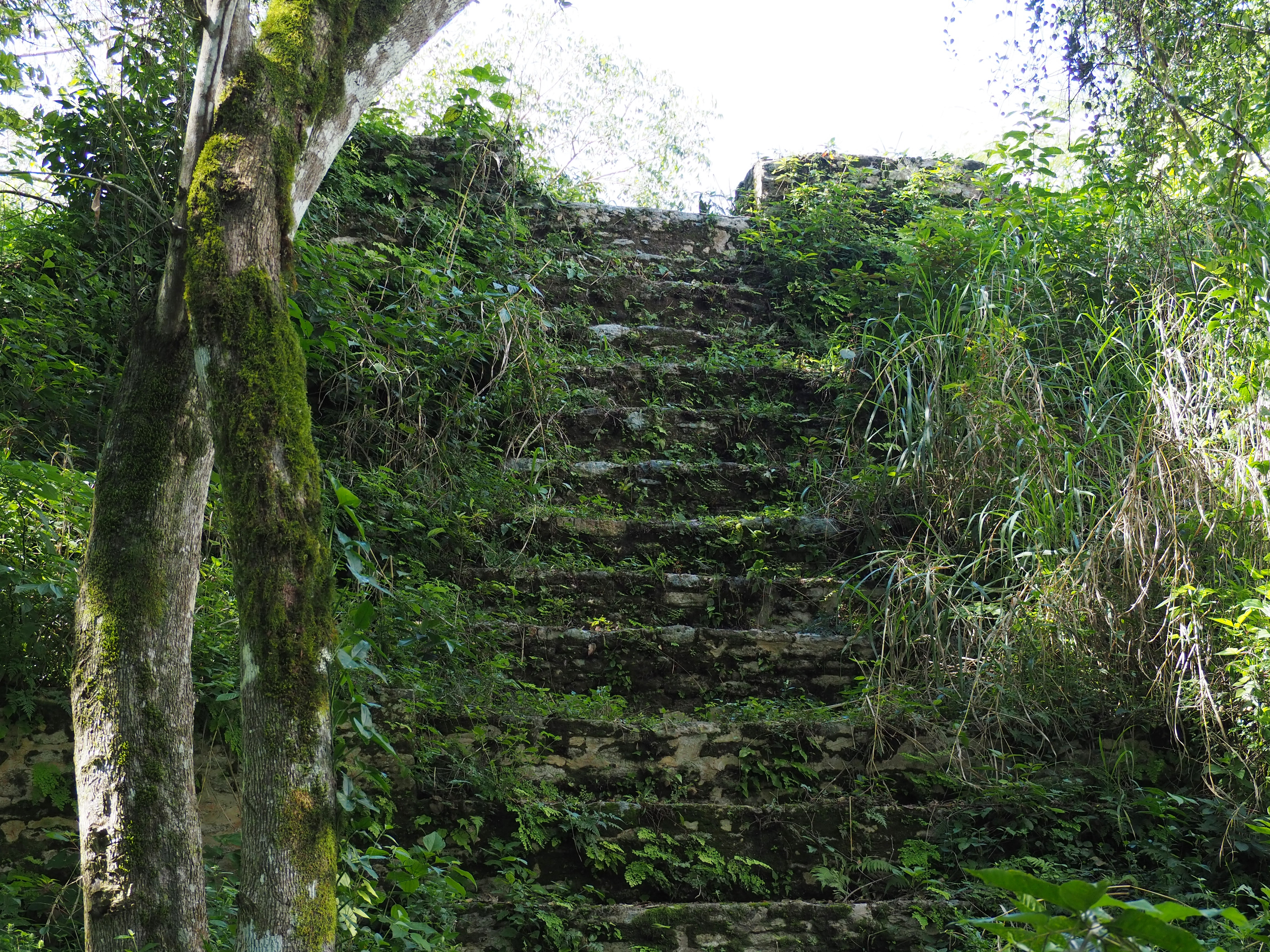
- Partially excavated mound at Pacbitun

- Location in Belize
- 17.092°N 88.995°W
- Cultures: Maya
- Location: Cayo District, Belize

History
- Built: c. 900 BCE
- Abandoned: c. 900 CE

Pacbitun is a Maya archaeological site located near the town of San Ignacio, Belize, in the Cayo District of west central Belize. The modern Maya name given to the site means “stone set in earth”, likely a reference to multiple fragments of stone monuments. The site, at about 240 m above sea level, is one of the earliest known from the southern Maya Lowlands, and was inhabited for almost 2000 years, from ca. 900 BCE to 900 CE. Strategically, it straddles a territory of rolling, hilly terrain between the Mountain Pine Ridge and the tropical forest covered lowlands of the Upper Belize River Valley.

== Site, architecture, monuments, and nearby caves ==
The central part (Epicenter and Core Zone) of the site lies atop a partly artificial, east-west acropolis of limestone, and is marked today by over 40 masonry structures surrounding five major plazas. Monumental architecture at the site includes multiple temple-pyramids, up to 12 m tall, including an E-Group (Eastern Shrine) architectural assemblage on Plaza A. The palaces of the royal court of Pacbitun are concentrated on Plazas B and C, while an early ceremonial ballcourt is located in Plaza E. The site has multiple elevated causeways (sacbeob) which radiate outward to monumental architectural complexes, including a terminus complex (Structure 10) at the end of the Mai Sacbe. Another causeway (Tzib Sacbe) runs as much as 1 km from the site center. The fragmentary remains of at least 20 monuments (13 stelae and 7 altars, to date) are mostly plain (and perhaps originally painted), with two carved monuments bearing partial hieroglyphic texts. Stela 6, found badly shattered atop Plaza A, has been reconstructed. It depicts a seated Maya ruler, with a Long Count date of 9.2.10.0.0 (March 22, 485 CE), one of the earliest monuments from the eastern Lowlands. A carved fragment of Altar 3 bears the lower half of an ornately dressed, human figure standing atop two hieroglyphs. One of these may represent the Pacbitun toponym of “Sky Cave”, which also occurs on a Late Classic carved slate monument (Stela 21) at the larger center of Caracol, about 50 km to the south. A number of subterranean, limestone caves, virtually all showing signs of ancient Maya use, have been identified in the Pacbitun Periphery Zone. The caves and other karst features (rockshelters, bedrock outcrops, etc.) investigated in the Pacbitun region were used utilized by the Late Preclassic-Early Classic period and activities continued even after the centre was abandoned. The Late to Terminal Classic period saw the most evidence of subterranean use, and many of the caves and rockshelters near Pacbitun were extensively modified over that span. The modifications include broken formations, formal architecture, and large buried caches. Materials from the caves dating to the Middle Preclassic and earlier, as well as those from the Postclassic through Colonial periods, are limited. Nevertheless, Pleistocene period giant sloth remains were found in Actun Lak Cave, and the continuation of Maya settlement at nearby Tipu through the Colonial period indicates that the caves in Pacbitun region hold potential for signs of use during these earlier and later times.

== Archaeological history ==
First reported in the 1970s, Pacbitun was excavated extensively in the late 20th century by archaeologist Paul F. Healy (Trent University) and, in the early 21st century, by Terry G. Powis (Kennesaw State University). Based on these multi-year investigations, it is evident that the site was inhabited very early in Maya history, and flourished during the Late and Terminal Classic period (550-900 CE), before being abandoned. There is, so far, almost no evidence of an occupation before 900 BCE, nor a significant habitation after 900 CE, during the Postclassic period.

Important contributors to the knowledge and publications about Pacbitun include (alphabetically): Jaime J. Awe, Cassandra R. Bill, Arianne Boileau, Melissa Campbell, Kong F. Cheong, James M. Conlon, Shannon Coyston, Pamela J.A. Downe, Kitty F. Emery, Paul F. Healy, Christophe G.B. Helmke, Hermann Helmuth, Bobbi Hohmann, Gyles Iannone, David L. Lentz, Terry G. Powis, Cal Ritchie, Catriona Robertson, Vanessa Rodens, Rhan-Ju Song, Jon Spenard, Norbert Stanchly, Kay S. Sunahara, Teresa B. Wagner, Drew Ward, Jennifer U. Weber, Christine D. White, Anne Wiesen, and Lori E. Wright.

== Preclassic period ==
There are three recognized phases of the Preclassic period (900 BCE-300 CE) at Pacbitun. These are the Middle Preclassic, Late Preclassic, and Terminal Preclassic. The phases are demarcated and distinguished by variations in, mostly monochrome, ceramics, and dated by radiocarbon determinations.

== Middle preclassic (900-300 BCE) ==
Pacbitun was first settled as a small, farming village, during the local Mai phase of the Middle Preclassic period. Evidence for occupation occurs in Plazas A, B, and C, including a tall, plastered, intact stepped platform located below what is Plaza A today. Discovered in 2013, the likely cruciform-shaped platform, possibly with stairs on all four sides, has been radiocarbon dated to about 600 BCE, and was a religious and ritual focus of the site at this early date. The platform, presumably for a temple, appears to have been burned and then abandoned by the Maya before covering it with successive, later plaza floors. Based on preliminary investigations, the temple measures 16.5 meters east-west x 3 meters north-south x 1.5 meters high. It has five steps which face eastward. Nearby, below Plaza B, excavations have revealed a series of low, quadrangular, earth-and-stone platforms, presumably the elevated bases for perishable pole-and-thatch roofed residential superstructures. These early buildings in Plaza B show signs of multiple, superimposed construction, and evidence (shell detritus, chert drills, beads in various stages of completion) for the concentrated manufacturing of thousands of small, shell, disk beads, perhaps as part of a very early Maya cottage industry. The site, by this date, was importing obsidian from the Guatemalan highlands, and marine shell from the Caribbean Sea. Site population was low, likely no more than several dozen villagers, representing a low-level chiefly society.

== Late preclassic and terminal preclassic (300 BCE-300 CE) ==
In the succeeding Puc and Ku phases, respectively, of the Late/Terminal Preclassic periods, Pacbitun underwent a major site transformation, with large-scale architectural renovations and plaza expansion. The first formal site planning occurred during this time, and most of the smaller Middle Preclassic residential architecture was intentionally built over, and covered, and new monumental constructions were begun atop these earlier structures. Structure 23 (and probably several other, adjacent range structures) of the Plaza B palace complex, Structures 14 and 15 (the ballcourt) in Plaza E, and Structures 1, 2, 4 and 5, the E-Group (Eastern Shrine) architectural complex on Plaza A, were begun at this time. The site population had risen to about 500-600 persons by the end of the Terminal Preclassic. The presence of such planning, and monumental architecture, suggests growing social stratification, and site prominence within the Belize River valley. The initial stage of construction for the ballcourt at Pacbitun represents some of the earliest architectural evidence for the ballgame being played in the Southern Maya Lowlands.

== Classic period ==
The Classic period represents a time of growth and fluorescence at Pacbitun. Three phases are represented at the site: Early Classic, Late Classic and Terminal Classic. Each phase has associated ceramics (monochrome and polychrome), and a suite of radiocarbon dates. The site appears to have been abandoned at the end of this period.

== Early classic (300-550 CE) ==
There is less evidence representing this time period than others at Pacbitun. Nevertheless, the Tzul phase of the Early Classic period saw hints of the enlargement of all major Core Zone architecture (for which excavations have been conducted). By now, Pacbitun has an established dynastic ruler, as evident from texts carved on Stela 6 and Altar 3. The site was significant enough to have acquired exotic materials, such as a green obsidian bipoint, imported hundred of kilometers from highland Central Mexico. This eccentric lithic had been ceremonially placed in a ballcourt cache of this date, along with a stemmed, chert, macropoint from the site of Colha, as well as jade, slate and shell carved objects.

== Late classic (550-800 CE) ==
Site growth continued into the succeeding Coc phase of the Late Classic period. Structures on Plaza A, in particular, show major architectural renewal, increasing their size and height. Judging from the presence and quantity of exotic goods, this was a period of significant site prosperity. The only large, corbel vaulted, masonry tomb from Pacbitun (BU 1-9) dates to this phase, and contained sumptuous funerary remains belonging to an adult (40- to 50-year-old) male individual. The tomb held polychrome decorated pottery, jade and shell jewelry, bone artifacts (likely hollow bone flutes), and a slate-backed pyrite mosaic mirror, while the interred individual and tomb floor were generously covered with cinnabar (red ochre), typically reserved as a sign of Maya royalty.15 By 800 CE, the site population is estimated to have risen to about 1400-1800 persons.

== Terminal classic (800-900 CE) ==
The last two centuries of occupation at Pacbitun, the Tzib phase of the Classic period, saw a sharp spike in population levels, possibly to 5000-6500 inhabitants within a 9 km^{2} area, with signs of a parallel intensification of agriculture in the surrounding countryside. Numerous hillsides around Pacbitun have relic traces of lengthy, stone wall constructions, mostly of Tzib phase date, indicative of agricultural terracing. This suggests that the leadership and residents of Pacbitun were attempting to cope with increased population pressure at the site. These final decades also show heightened ritual activity, in the form of abundant ceremonial caches, largely pottery offerings, though these late caches contain fewer exotic materials (shell, jade, obsidian, slate) than in earlier phases of the Classic period. The last pottery cache from Pacbitun generated a radiocarbon date of 860 CE (+/- 40).

== Subsistence and settlement ==
Excavations have produced abundant information on the Maya exploitation of fauna and flora. Key mammalian species hunted at Pacbitun were deer (both white tailed and brocket), peccary (both White-lipped and Collared), and tapir, along with smaller numbers of domesticated dog, jaguar, and howler monkey. There were also traces of turtles, likely caught from a local waterhole, catfish, perhaps from the Macal River, agouti, paca, curassow and turkey, and very large quantities of shells from collected freshwater snails (jute). The latter, were likely a protein supplement to the local diet. Paleobotanical evidence (macrobotanicals) indicate the Pacbitun Maya made use of corn, as well as ramon and coyol. Chemical analyses of samples of human bone and teeth have revealed insights to subsistence, nutrition and health of the Pacbitun Maya.

More than 300 housemounds were identified and mapped through field survey in the Periphery Zone surrounding the center, and about a quarter of these were test excavated. The latter provide evidence to document settlement patterns, and population changes, over time at Pacbitun. Slightly more than half of these elevated knolls were stand alone, isolated, mounds. The rest were found clustered in residential patio groups (plazuelas), typically with three mounds. Ranging in size from about 1–2 m tall, these mounds (following excavation) were shown to be primarily earth and stone residential platforms for perishable houses of the common Maya. Many had typical household refuse associated with them, including remains of manos and metates, broken stone tools (chert and obsidian), and coarse, household pottery. Some also contained humble, common graves within them, placed by the Maya below house floors of dirt or plaster. The majority of the housemounds were clustered (in number and density) within 250 m of the center of the site, but some mounds have been identified as much as 3-5 kilometers away.

== Mortuary customs ==
Burials at the site show clear mortuary traditions linked to other sites of the Belize River Valley. The vast majority of the identified burials contained individuals lying in an extended position, on their backs (supine), with heads to the south. This burial pattern is well documented at neighboring Valley sites. Among the site elite, Pacbitun exhibited a surprising number of burials with a male and female pair. There were also several interments of sacrificial victims (both adults and children). Mortuary offerings for commoners were simple, and limited in quantity, while elite graves (crypts and one tomb) included a wide array of items, including many exotics, like jade jewelry, marine shell ornaments, eccentric flints, painted, polychrome pottery, slate items, and even musical instruments. The latter are relatively rare finds at most Maya sites and included, at Pacbitun ceramic ocarinas, effigy whistles, rattles (or maracas), flutes, and even a pottery hand drum. Most of the instruments were recovered from burials containing elite Maya women, or individuals of sub-elite status residing in the Core Zone during the last part of the Classic period.

== Craft production ==
In addition to evidence at Pacbitun from the Preclassic period for shell ornament production, a Late Classic period slate workshop has been identified, attached (literally and figuratively) to the royal court zone of Plaza B. Quantities of worked, marine shell refuse, and a granite groundstone tool workshop for the production of manos and metates, have been found in the Periphery Zone of Pacbitun, also dating to the Late Classic. All these suggest that the site was involved, for centuries, in a range of craft production as well as import and export activities.

Pacbitun was abandoned by about 900 CE, for reasons that remain unclear, but which surely were connected to the widespread abandonment of dozens of other, major centers of the Southern Lowlands at this time, as part of a phenomenon known as the Classic Maya collapse.
