= Las Bocas =

Mexican minor archaeological site in Puebla

Coordinates: 18°40′N 98°19′W

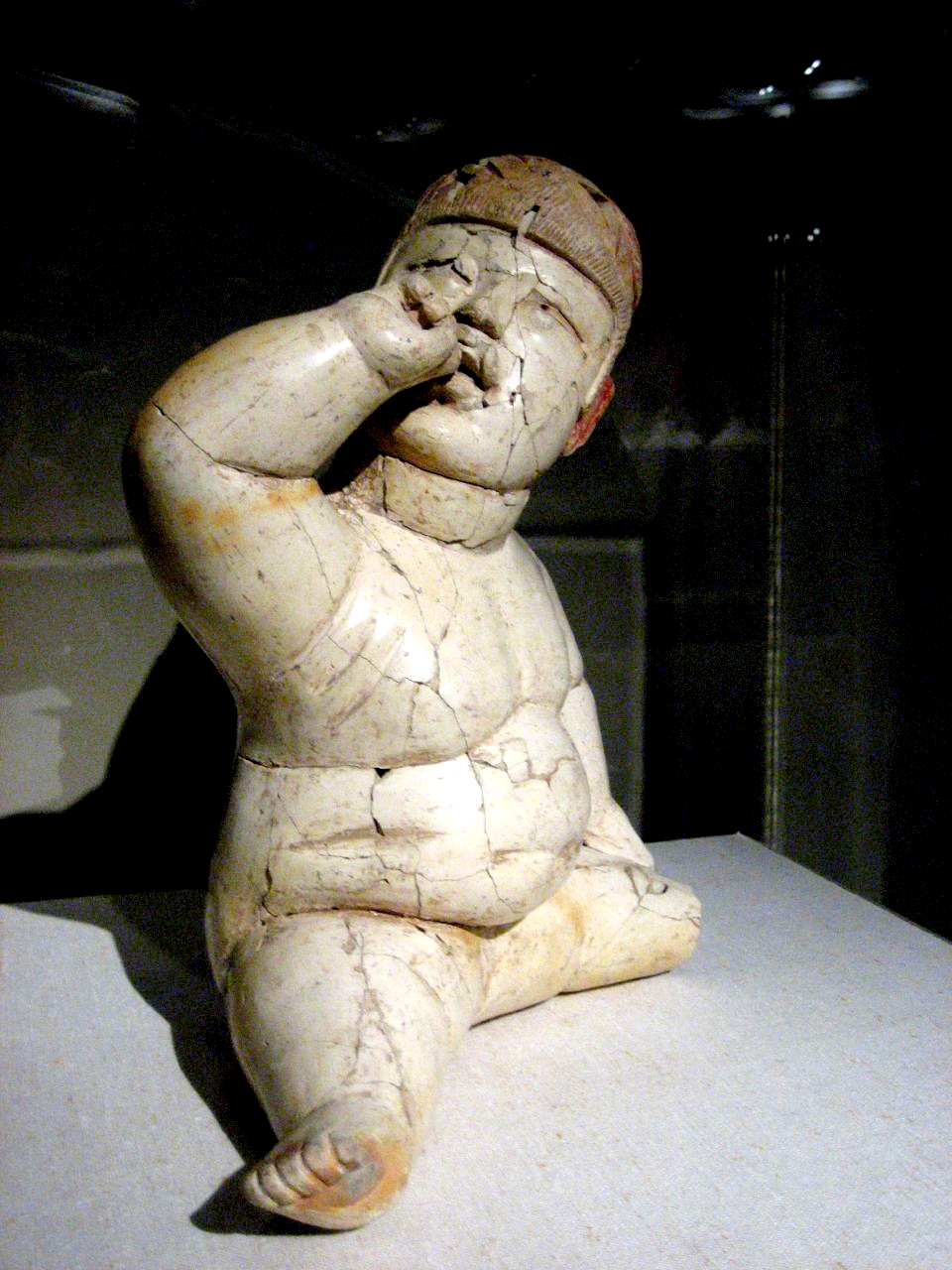
An archetypical baby-face figurine from Las Bocas.

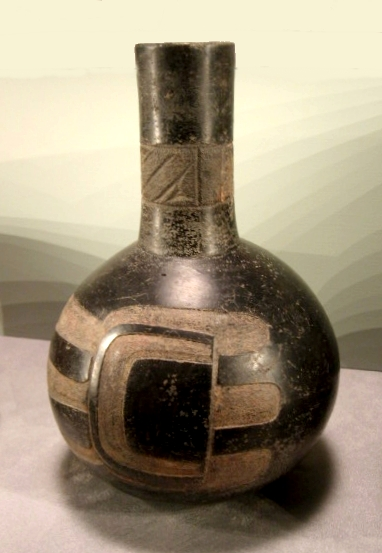
An Olmec-style bottle, reputedly from Las Bocas, 1100 - 800 BCE.

Las Bocas is a minor archaeological site in the Mexican state of Puebla, whose name has become attached, often erroneously, to a wide-ranging type of Olmec-style figurines and pottery.

The Las Bocas site, part of the Balsas River basin, was heavily plundered in the 1960s by looters looking for "Olmec" pottery and figurines. As the prestige associated with "Las Bocas" artifacts grew, that label was given to many similar artifacts – and occasional forgeries – of unknown origin. The high numbers of artifacts attributed to the site are "implausible at best", and as a result, the term "Las Bocas" has now little archaeological significance.

The first systematic archaeological investigation of Las Bocas was begun by David Grove in 1967. In 1997, the archaeologist María de la Cruz Paillés Hernández started the first of her three seasons at the site.

== Field Seasons: 1997–2000 ==
=== Funding ===
The first field season of Maria de la Cruz Paillés Hernández, in 1997, was funded that same year by INAH (Instituto Nacional de Antropología e Historia) in the amount of $30,000 pesos. The second field season, 1998, also funded by INAH, was supplied with $23,000 pesos and had to be shortened to 21 days. Originally, the third field season had been scheduled for 1999, but funding was not available that year. In 2000, FAMSI (Foundation for the Advancement of Mesoamerican Studies, Inc.) gave $7,800 USD to Paillés Hernández for the third field season via INAH, but INAH delayed in relaying the funds for a month and a half, causing the third field season to take place during rains.

=== Archaeological Work ===
The second field season was intended to yield a general overview of the contexts of the Las Bocas site, and to determine areas to be explored later.

Paillés Hernández considered the Las Bocas site to include the nearby Caballo Pintado because of relevant sites found in the area.

The third field season continued the work of the second field season and referenced its findings for a greater understanding of context. Several pits were excavated during the third field season; some stratigraphy was found to be unreliable because of the facts that, the artifacts near the surface had mixed dates, and "the land surface was removed with heavy machinery back in 1994," almost completely destroying the classic and post-classic artifacts. A looter's pit was also found while excavating.

=== Findings ===
Several ceramic pieces were found during the third field season of Paillés Hernández; these dated from as early as the Ayotla phase (1250-1000 B.C.) to the Manantial phase (1000-800 B.C.) of the formative stage. The pieces found included several fragments of figurines. The head of a "baby-face" figurine was found with a similar cranial deformation to an Olmec skull found at Pampa el Pajón.

Carved stone objects were also found during the third field season; they were composed of obsidian and either silex or chert.

The burial of an adult individual was uncovered during the third field season of 2000, it was the second burial found at the site. It was found with a cajete, a small figurine of a dog, and fragments of a small box.

== Las Bocas-style Figurines ==
=== Description ===
The term "Las Bocas-style" refers to a style of Olmec figurine allegedly found at the Las Bocas site. The style is defined by looted materials that may or may not have actually come from the Las Bocas site.

=== Credibility of Origin ===
The term "Las Bocas-style" is based on a fallacy; the Las Bocas-style figurines were never connected to the actual Las Bocas site. They were only claimed to have been found on the site by those who sold them on the art market contemporaneously with the occurrences of looting at Las Bocas. With their advertised origins, the figurines received higher market prices and considerably more interest – consequentially, those who sold them may have been motivated to misrepresent the origins of artifacts that were possibly found at other sites. Because of the lack of contextual evidence to link the figurines with Las Bocas, and the high probability of improperly represented origins, the Las Bocas-style figurines cannot be attributed to the site of Las Bocas.
