= Petén Basin =

Geographical region of Mesoamerica

Coordinates: 16°54′N 89°54′W

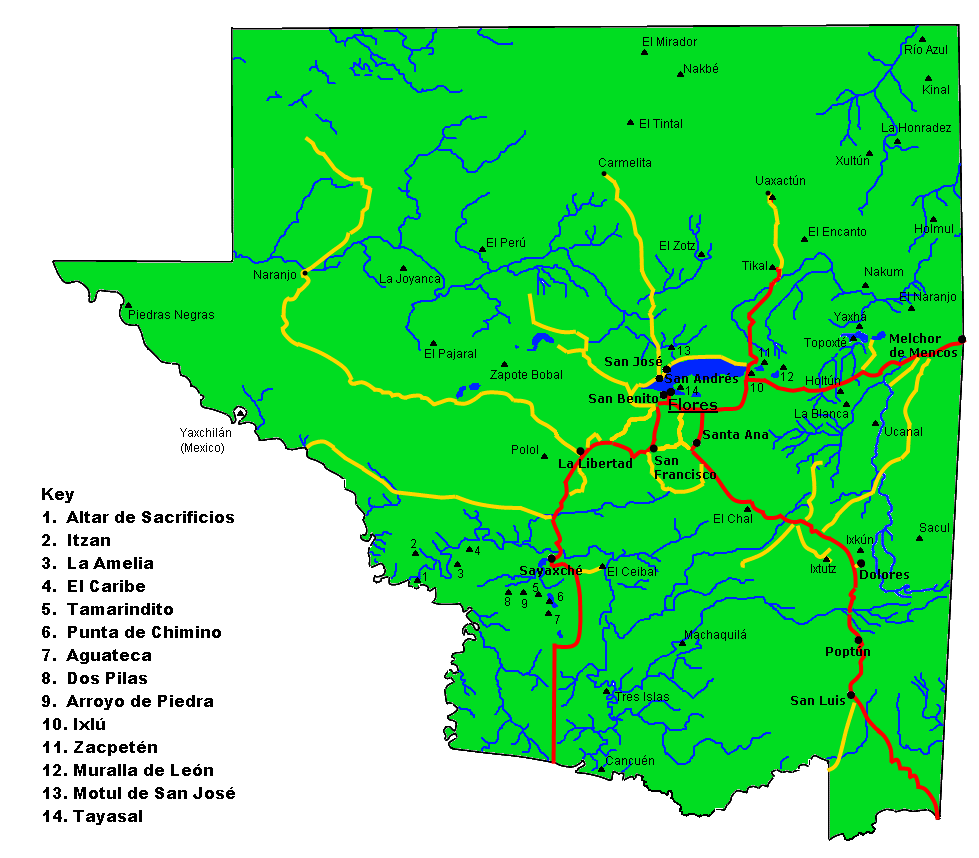
Map of Petén Department, showing principal settlements and archaeological sites.

The Petén Basin is a geographical subregion of the Maya Lowlands, primarily located in northern Guatemala within the Department of El Petén, and into the state of Campeche in southeastern Mexico.

During the Late Preclassic and Classic periods of pre-Columbian Mesoamerican chronology many major centers of the Maya civilization flourished, such as Tikal and Calakmul. A distinctive Petén-style of Maya architecture and inscriptions arose. The archaeological sites La Sufricaya and Holmul are also located in this region.

== History ==
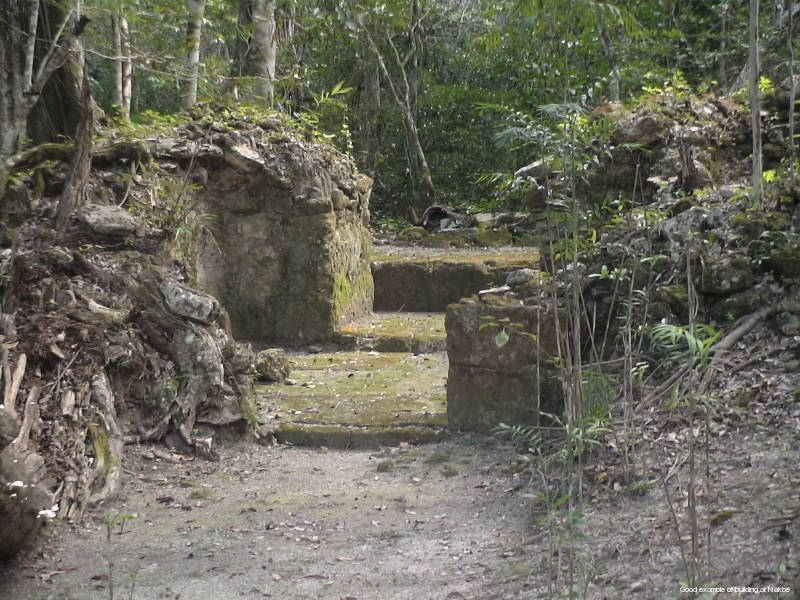
Nakbé, Mid Preclassic (600 BCE) Palace remains, The Mirador Basin

By the first half of the 1st millennium BCE, the Petén and Mirador Basin of this region were already well-established with a number of monumental sites and cities of the Maya civilization. Significant Maya sites of this Preclassic era of Mesoamerican chronology include Nakbé, El Mirador, Naachtun, San Bartolo and Cival in the Mirador Basin.

=== Classic Period ===
Later, Petén became the heartland of the Maya Classic Period (c. 200 – 900 CE). At its height around 750 it is estimated that the Petén Basin was home to several million people, being one of the most densely populated regions of the world at the time. Some areas are estimated to have had ca 2,000 people/km^{2}. Mesoamerican agriculture was very extensive, and there is some evidence suggesting that the land was depleted by unsustainable overfarming, resulting in a famine which was an important factor in the collapse of the Classic Maya states of this area. The population is estimated to have dropped by two-thirds between the mid 9th century and the mid 10th century.

Archaeological sites

Archaeological sites preserve important remnants of the Classic Maya in Petén Basin, such as:

- On the Holmul River: Tikal, Holmul, Calakmul, Uaxactún, Nakum, Naranjo, La Sufricaya
- On the Usumacinta River: Machaquilá, Piedras Negras, Altar de Sacrificios
- On the San Pedro Mártir River: Waka' formerly El Perú
- In the Petexbatún area: Ceibal and Aguateca
- On La Pasión River: Cancuén
- On Lake Yaxha: Topoxté and Yaxhá

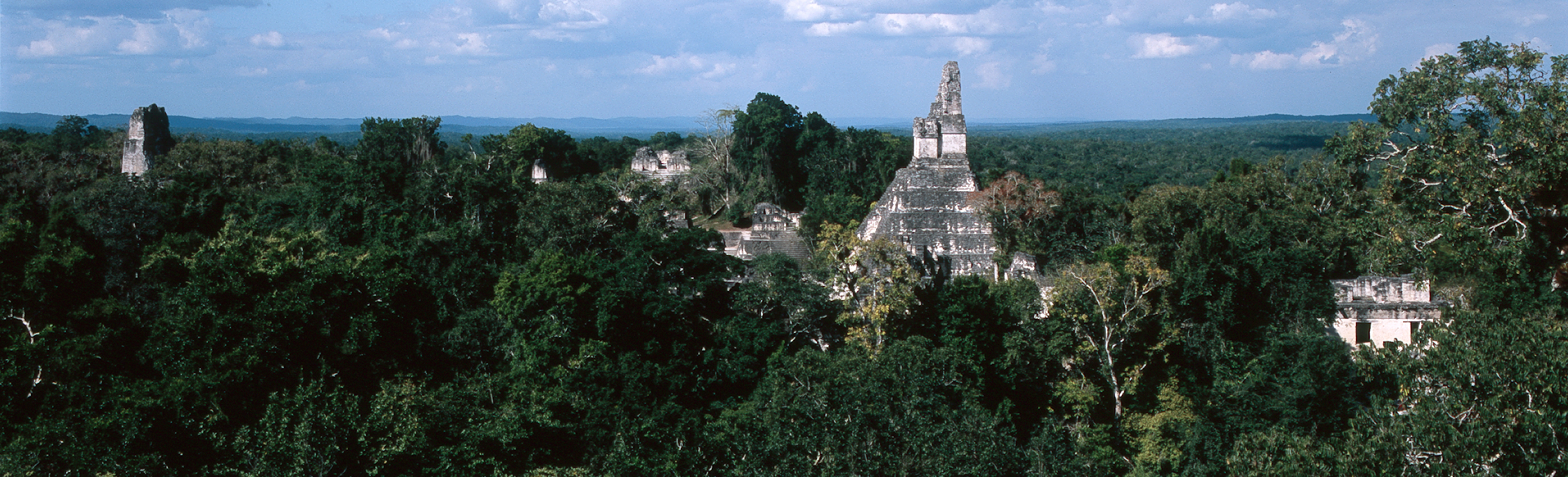
Tikal, rising above jungle canopy

Tikal National Park is one of the only sites to be designated a World Heritage Site for both archaeological and biodiversity reasons. Many thousands of house mounds where worshipers and workers once lived were discovered at Tikal.

=== Spanish colonial period ===
After the Classic Period collapse the population of the area continued to drop dramatically, especially after the introduction of smallpox along with European explorers. The smallpox plague arrived around 1519 or 1520, preceding by several years the first Europeans to visit the region. Hernán Cortés led the first expedition to pass through the Petén Basin, in 1524 to 1525, and reported that the region mostly had small hamlets separated by thick forest, with Tayasal being the only sizable inhabited city they observed.

After Cortés' expedition, the colonial Spanish largely tried to conquer Petén Basin, with several attempts mainly from Belize and Alta Verapaz, for generations until an expedition from Yucatán, Belize and Cobán in Alta Verapaz, succeeded in conquering the last independent Maya polities around 1697, such as Zacpeten (capital of the Kowoj Maya), the Itza Maya center of Tayasal, and other towns in the Lake Petén Itza region such as Quexil (modern Spanish name, in Maya: Ek'ixil) and Yalain. (see: Spanish conquest of Yucatán).

The Spanish town of Flores was established atop the site of Tayasal, but this remained an isolated backwater through the colonial Viceroyalty of New Spain era and after Mexican independence. When Guatemalan President Rafael Carrera sent a small force to Flores to claim the region for Guatemala in the 1840s, the governments of Mexico and the state of Yucatán decided the Petén Basin area was not worth the trouble of contesting.

== See also ==
- Geography of Mesoamerica
- Maya sites in Petén Department
- Maya sites in Campeche
