= Zacpeten =

Pre-Columbian Mayan archaeological site in Guatemala

Coordinates: 16°59′N 89°39′W

Zacpeten is a pre-Columbian Maya archaeological site in the northern Petén Department of Guatemala. It is notable as one of the few Maya communities that maintained their independence through the early phases of Spanish control over Mesoamerica.

== History ==
The site of Zacpeten occupies a peninsula on Lake Salpeten in the Petén Department of northern Guatemala. The site was sporadically inhabited by the Maya since its initial settlement during the Middle Preclassic (1000 – 300 BC). After abandonment during Late Preclassic and Early Classic, the site was resettled from the Late to Terminal Classic (AD 600 – 950). Abandoned again, it was reoccupied in the Late Postclassic by the Maya peoples who survived the Classic Maya collapse and migrated from Mayapan in Yucatán (now in Mexico) after the collapse of the city in the fifteenth century. These people, the Kowoj Maya, brought their distinctive pottery and constructed typical Mayapan temple assemblages with a raised shrine lying at a right angle to a western facing temple rather than facing it, a very different pattern to ceremonial architecture outside central Peten. This civilisation flourished and remained independent of Spanish domination until late into the 17th century, usually recorded as 1697.

== Site description ==
Several archaeological investigations have emphasised the similarity to the site of Mayapan. The site has been designated into 6 alphabetical areas. Groups A, B and C were important ceremonial complexes. Groups D, E and F are residential groups. The main Zacpeten settlement has a defensive wall with 2 parapets and a moat located at the northern end of the peninsula where it meets the mainland. Groups A to E are located on the peninsula but Group F is located on the mainland.

=== Group A ===
Group A occupies a central hill upon the peninsula. The ceremonial centre has been dated to the Postclassic period but overlies earlier occupation levels dating to the Middle Preclassic and Late Classic periods. The group contains two open halls and a short causeway that bisects the plaza.

=== Other groups ===
Group B was built upon the northern section of the peninsula; it includes a possible Late Classic twin-pyramid complex. Group B also contains a number of structures dating to the Late Postclassic period. Inscriptions on the monuments and the layout and inscriptions on the monuments of Group B suggest Late Classic ties with Tikal, a regional center located 25 km north of Zacpeten.

Group C was a Late Postclassic ceremonial complex; it was built upon a hill occupying the southern portion of the peninsula.

Group F is a residential group to the north of the defensive system on the mainland and may also date to the Terminal Classic period. Zacpeten's Late Postclassic period occupation is concentrated in four of the five groups on the peninsula. Groups D and E were elite residential groups while Groups A and C are dominated by ceremonial buildings style similar to that of Mayapan, and associated with the Kowoj. This style consists of a temple assemblage with raised shrines that lie a right angles to a western facing temple rather than facing into it. This specific variant appears at central Petén Basin sites including Topoxte and Muralla de Leon.

Ceremonial architecture outside the Zacpeten area follows a very different pattern. For example, Late Postclassic Itzá ceremonial groups do not appear to include formal temples. The residences at Zacpeten are tandem-shaped structures standing in patio groups. Tandem residences include a front room and back room and the former has a plastered and occasionally painted surface while the latter has an earthen floor. Household production activities are concentrated in the back room, while socializing and ritual performances were focused upon the front room.
