= Yaxhá Lake =

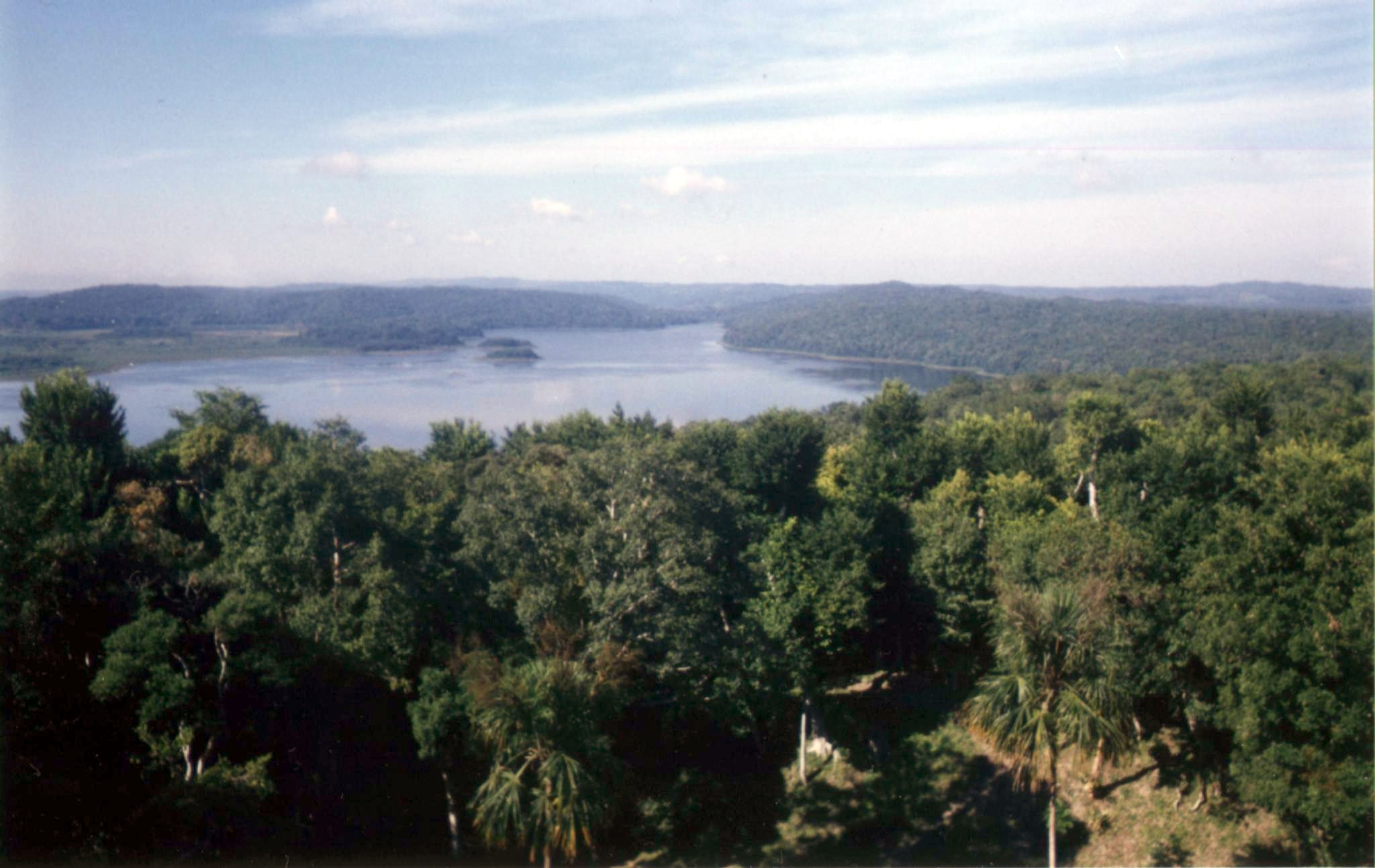
- View of Yaxhá Lake from the Maya ruins of Yaxhá

- Location within Guatemala
- Location: El Petén
- Coordinates: 17°04′N 89°24′W
- Type: limestone lake
- Basin countries: Guatemala
- Surface area: 15 km^{2} (5.8 sq mi)
- Max. depth: 27 m (89 ft)
- Surface elevation: 158 m (518 ft)

Yaxhá Lake is a Guatemalan lake situated in the northern department of El Petén.

The ancient Maya City of Yaxhá was built on the shores of Yaxhá Lake, and the Maya ruins of Topoxté occupy a group of three small islands, Canté, Paxté and Topoxte, at the western end of the lake.
