= Kowoj =

Late Postclassical Mayan group

The Kowoj [koʔwox] (also recorded as Ko'woh, Couoh, Coguo, Cohuo, Kob'ow and Kob'ox, and Kowo) was a Maya group and polity, from the Late Postclassic period (ca. 1250–1697) of Mesoamerican chronology. The Kowoj claimed to have migrated from Mayapan sometime after the city's collapse in 1441 AD. Indigenous documents also describe Kowoj in Mayapan and linguistic data indicate migrations between the Yucatán Peninsula and the Petén region.

A specific variant of temple assemblage, in a C-shaped plaza, defines the location of the Kowoj in both Mayapan and Petén. These assemblages were the exemplary centers of the Ko'woj. The temple assemblages also communicated a prestigious connection with Mayapan and differentiated the Kowoj from their Itzá neighbors in the Petén Basin region. Temple assemblage with raised shrine lies at a right angle to a western facing temple rather than facing into it. This specific variant appears at central Petén sites including Zacpetén, Topoxte, and Muralla de Leon, all of which lie within the reconstructed Ko'woj social boundaries. Ceremonial architecture outside these boundaries follows a very different pattern. For example, Late Post Classic Itzá ceremonial groups do not appear to include formal temples. The residences at Zacpetén are tandem-shaped structures standing in patio groups. Tandem residences include a front room and back room, the former has a plastered and occasionally painted surface while the latter has an earthen floor. Household production activities are concentrated in the back room, while socializing and ritual performances were focused upon the front room.

Their main cities were Zacpeten, on the Salpetén lake, Ixlu, between Petén Itzá and Salpetén lakes, and Topoxte on the Yaxha lagoon, that was abandoned prior to their conquest in 1697 AD. The Ko'woj and the Itzá were the last cultures to be conquered in Mesoamerica.

== See also ==
- Kan Ek'
- List of Mayan languages
- Hunac Ceel
- Moch Kowoj – leader of neighbouring polity
