= Topoxte =

Archaeological site in Guatemala

Coordinates: 17°3′57.51″N 89°25′10.62″W

- Location within Guatemala
- Region: Petén Department, Guatemala

Topoxte (/tɒpɒʃtˈɛ/) (or Topoxté in Spanish orthography) is a pre-Columbian Maya archaeological site in the Petén Basin in northern Guatemala with a long occupational history dating as far back as the Middle Preclassic. As the capital of the Kowoj Maya, it was the largest of the few Postclassic Mesoamerican sites in the area. Topoxte is located on an island on Yaxha Lake across from the important Classic period center of Yaxha.

Topoxte was named by Teobert Maler in 1904; the name means "seed of the Ramón tree." There is no record of the name Topoxte prior to this. The Ramón tree, commonly known as breadnut, was an important component of the ancient Maya diet. Prior to this the site was known as Islapag, as noted in 1831 by Juan Galindo in his report to the Society of Antiquaries of London.

== Location ==
Topoxte occupies five of a cluster of six islands at the western end of Lake Yaxha in the municipality of Melchor de Mencos in the eastern part of the Guatemalan department of Petén. Due to the extreme fluctuations of the water level of the lake, these islands can sometimes become landlocked.

The principal occupation existed on the three islands named Topoxte, Cante and Paxte. When the water level was higher the lake was connected via a natural canal to the neighbouring Lake Sacnab, which lies to the east. Three smaller lakes lie to the west, from west to east they are lakes Chompoxte, Colorada and Coloradita.

The island of Topoxte lies at an altitude of 168 metres (551 ft) above sea level. The island is formed from limestone with the highest elevation in the northern part of the island, sloping gently down towards the south.

The closest town is Flores, the capital of the Petén department, 52 kilometres (32 mi) to the west as the crow flies. Topoxte is 29 kilometres (18 mi) west of the international border with Belize and about 80 kilometres (50 mi) south of the international border with Mexico. It is 28 kilometres (17 mi) northeast of Zacpeten, another important Kowoj settlement.

== History ==
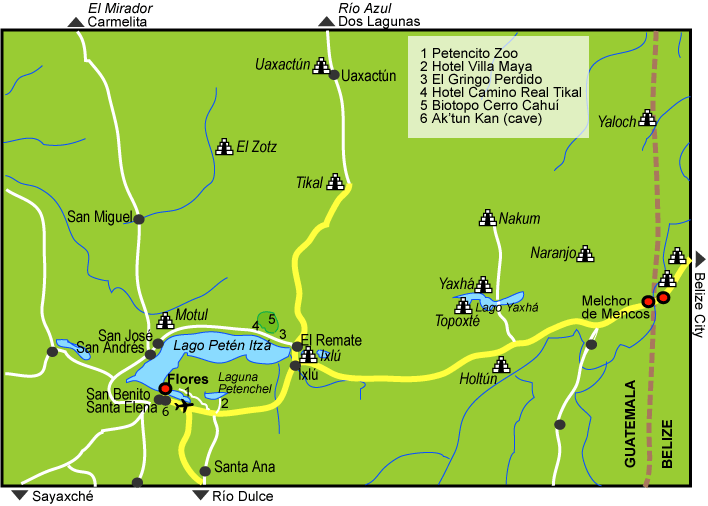
The location of Topoxté in relation to other Maya sites in the eastern Petén.

Archaeological investigations have revealed that the site was occupied from the Middle Preclassic right through to the Late Postclassic. Obsidian from the Ixtepeque source started to be used from the Terminal Classic onwards and is used as a diagnostic marker for dating finds to the later periods of occupation at the site, when Ixtepeque became the principal source of obsidian for Topoxte and the wider Maya lowlands.

The site was abandoned at the end of the Classic period (ca. 900) and reoccupied during the Postclassic at approximately 1100. After being inhabited for a further three and a half centuries it may finally have been abandoned around 1450, although this has now been challenged.

=== Preclassic Period ===
The site was first occupied toward the end of the Middle Preclassic, as evidenced by a number of burials and artifacts dating to this period, and the possible Late Preclassic substructure underlying Building C on Topoxte Island. However, evidence for Middle Preclassic occupation is scarce and is largely confined to the Main Plaza on Topoxte Island.

Ceramic evidence indicates that there was a degree of contact with the Guatemalan highlands in the Late Preclassic.

=== Classic Period ===
Burial 49, which dates to AD 750, indicates a marriage of the Lady Twelve Guacamaya from Topoxte with a prince from Tikal. In the Terminal Classic, immediately prior to the temporary abandonment of the site, the ceramic style of Topoxte was very similar to the ceramics of Tikal and Uaxactun. At this time, Topoxte was a part of the Yaxha polity.

=== Postclassic Period ===
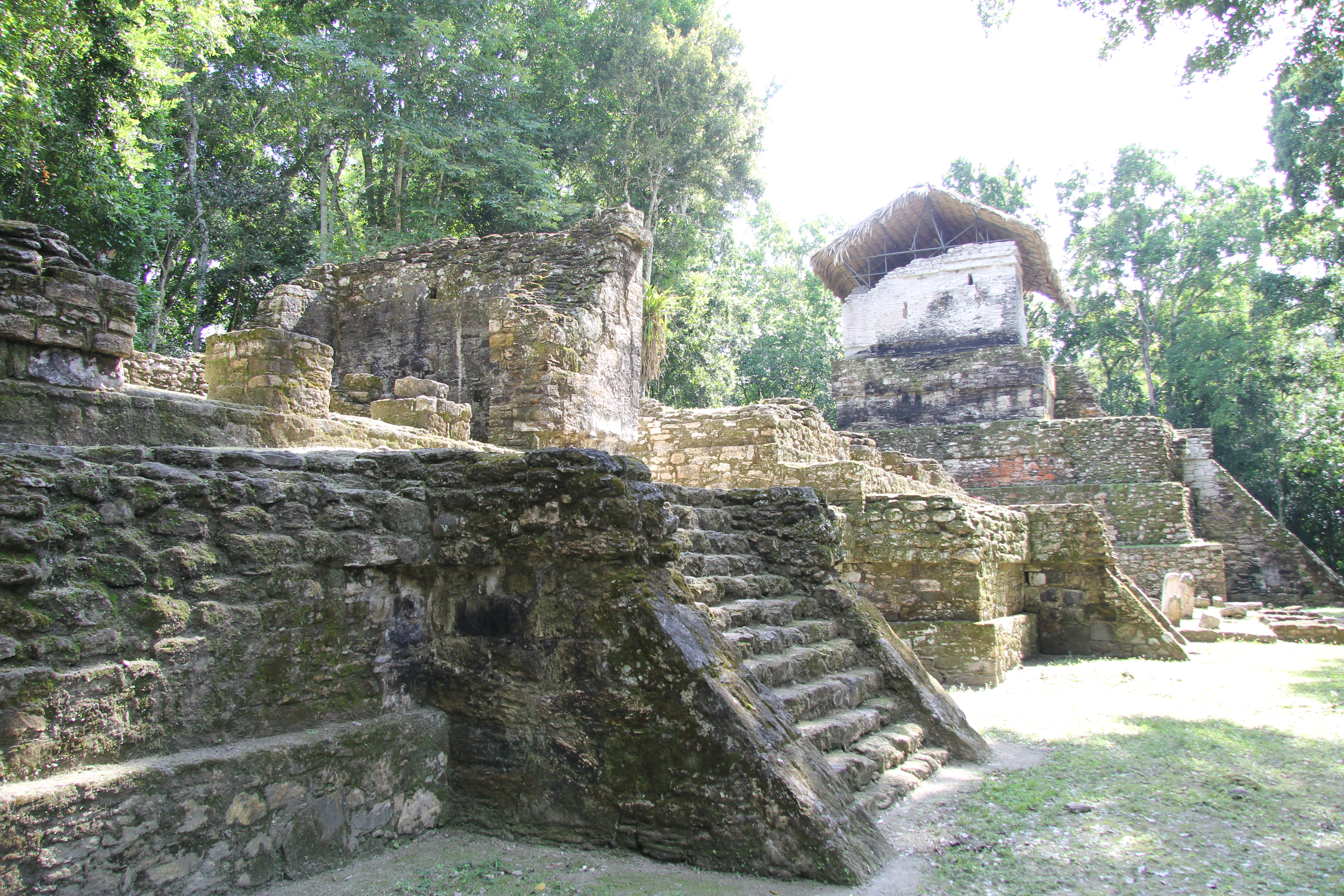
Ceremonial architecture at Topoxte, Buildings E, D and C on the main plaza of the principal island.

Topoxte was an important site in the Postclassic and had close ties with the city of Mayapan in the north of the Yucatán Peninsula. It was fortified and probably served as an important nexus in the trade routes between the Maya highlands and the Yucatán. It was a small capital with about six temples and a similar number of open halls. As well as strong ties with Mayapan, there are striking similarities with sites of the Tulum group, indicating that these sites belong to the same specific cultural tradition.

Some plain stelae were raised in the Postclassic, which were perhaps covered in stucco and painted. This may represent a revival of the katun-ending ceremonies that occurred in the Classic Period, again reflecting ties with the northern Yucatán. Strong ties with Mayapan are also reflected by the ceramic style, particularly modelled effigy incense burners.

The three principal islands were densely inhabited during the Postclassic with a great deal of construction taking place. The site was abandoned about the same time as Mayapan, around 1450, when the Kowoj Maya, moved their capital west to Zacpetén Island in the Salpetén lake, near the Peten Itza lake.

=== Colonial history ===
Spanish missionaries Fuensalida and Orbita are said to have passed by Lake Yaxha in 1618, at which time they reported that there appeared to be no inhabitants, indicating that the site had already been abandoned by this time. However, it has been suggested that their indigenous guides deliberately led them via a neighbouring lake in order to mislead them into thinking that the Yaxhá region was uninhabited. The mention of Lake Yaxha by these missionaries is the only mention of the lake in colonial period records.

=== Modern history ===
Although he probably never visited the site, the existence of Topoxte was first reported by Juan Galindo in 1831, in his report to the Society of Antiquaries. Teoberto Maler spent three days at the site in 1904, clearing the site core and describing Building C and recording 9 stela-altar pairs. Sylvanus Morley visited Topoxte in 1914, describing the sculptured stelae of the site, including 2 on Cante Island. In 1933 Cyrus L. Lundell and L. C. Stuart made a new plan of the main plaza and assigned the nomenclature to the structures that is still used today. William R. Bullard carried out excavations at Topoxte from 1958 to 1960 and identified the Postclassic occupation of the site. Further excavations were carried out in 1973 and 1974 by Don and Prudence Rice, on Cante Island.

The site was damaged by looters in the 1970s and 80s. PRONAT (Proyecto Nacional Tikal) undertook clearing and restoration work at Topoxte in 1989, including the erection of scaffolding and a protective roof on Building C, the main temple. Archaeological investigations of the site were undertaken from 1991 to 1993.

== The site ==
The principal ruins of the pre-Columbian city are spread over three islands:Topoxte, Cante and Paxte, in the southwest of Yaxha Lake, of which Topoxte is the largest. All three of these islands were densely occupied, with all construction except the ceremonial architecture being aligned according to the local topography.

=== Paxte Island ===
Paxte Island is the smallest of the three principal islands with a surface area of approximately 3 hectares (320,000 sq ft). It is about 100 metres (328 ft) west of Topoxte Island. 68 structures have been identified on Paxte, mostly low rectangular platforms built from unworked limestone, presumably the remains of domestic buildings. There are two groups of larger buildings located on the highest part of the island, aligned north–south, a fact that distinguishes them from the smaller residential buildings, which are aligned according to the local topography. Excavations suggest that Paxte was occupied from the Late Classic into the Postclassic.

=== Cante Island ===
Cante Island has a surface area of approximately 6.5 hectares (700,000 sq ft), with a steep slope on the east side and a gentler slope on the west side. Cante lies to the west of Paxte Island and contains the remains of 142 structures that have been mapped. The main group is organised around a plaza but the majority of the buildings were arranged according to the local topography. Almost all the structures of Cante are medium-sized rectangular platforms. Like Paxte, Cante appears to have been occupied from the Late Classic into the Postclassic. Sylvanus Morley found 2 sculpted stelae on the island in 1914, they have been dated to the Late Classic.

=== Topoxte Island ===
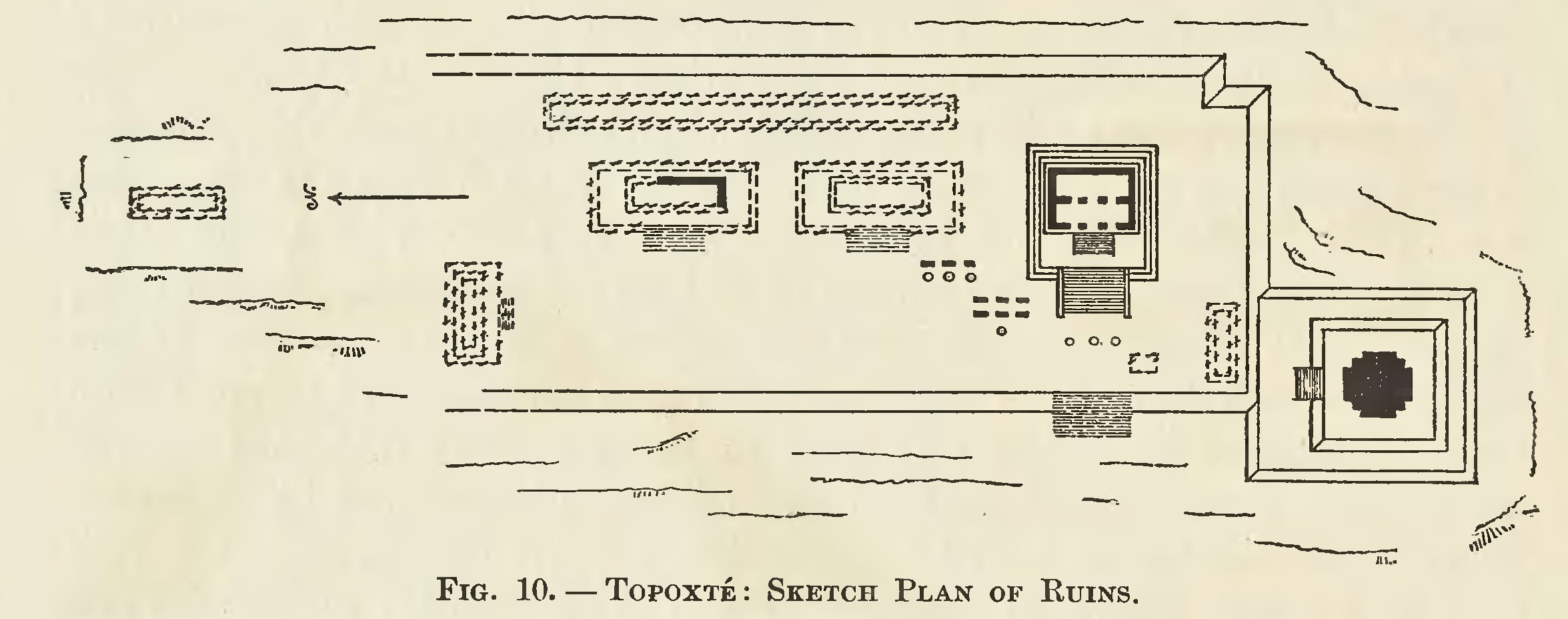
Plan of the ruins as published in 1908 by Teoberto Maler

Topoxte Island measures roughly 450 metres (1,480 ft) from north to south and 400 metres (1,300 ft) from east to west, it has a crescent shape with a bay on the west side. It is the largest of the three principal islands and contains the remains of around 100 structures, as well as the principal ceremonial centre of the city. The largest structures are largely concentrated in two groups in the centre and in the north of the island.

Topoxte Island had a surge in construction activity in the Postclassic suggesting a population influx at this time, in parallel to an equivalent influx into the area of Lake Petén Itzá region in response to the collapse of Chichen Itza in the north of the Yucatán Peninsula. The ceremonial architecture at Topoxte includes two major periods of construction in the Late Postclassic and closely reflects that at Zacpeten, another Kowoj site, and also seems to be linked to activity at Mayapan.

Ten different construction phases are apparent in the archaeological record of Topoxte. The first three phases date to the Preclassic. There are three distinctive groups at the site, two 5 meter tall platforms, and a low residential area consisting of more than 100 structures. The site's central plaza is bounded by 3 temples constructed in the Postclassic architectural style similar to structures at Mayapan (incorporating vertical walls, columns and flat stone ceilings).

The ruins on the island of Topoxte start about four meters above the current level of Lake Yaxha, indicating that the Postclassic water level was roughly the same as present, or perhaps slightly higher. The site was laid out in a manner very similar to the contemporary site of Tayasal on Lake Petén Itzá, now covered by the modern town of Flores, with buildings on the north, south and east side of the main plaza and the west side open to the lake and the sunset. The stone buildings of Topoxte were all built with limestone.

The Main Plaza is built upon an artificial platform constructed with more than 9 metres (30 ft) of fill. It is roughly rectangular with a surface area of approximately 1,410 square metres (15,200 ft^{2}), it is one of the highest plazas on the island. The plaza is open on the west side and bordered on the north by Building G, on the south by Building B and on the east by Buildings C, D and E. The majority of worked monuments at Topoxte are located in the southwest corner of this plaza. The Main Plaza was the focus of activity from very early in the history of the site, with an offering dating to the Middle Preclassic being found in front of Building E and further Middle Preclassic evidence being found in deep levels in front of Building D. However, the plaza did not reach its maximum size until the Postclassic.

==== Building C ====
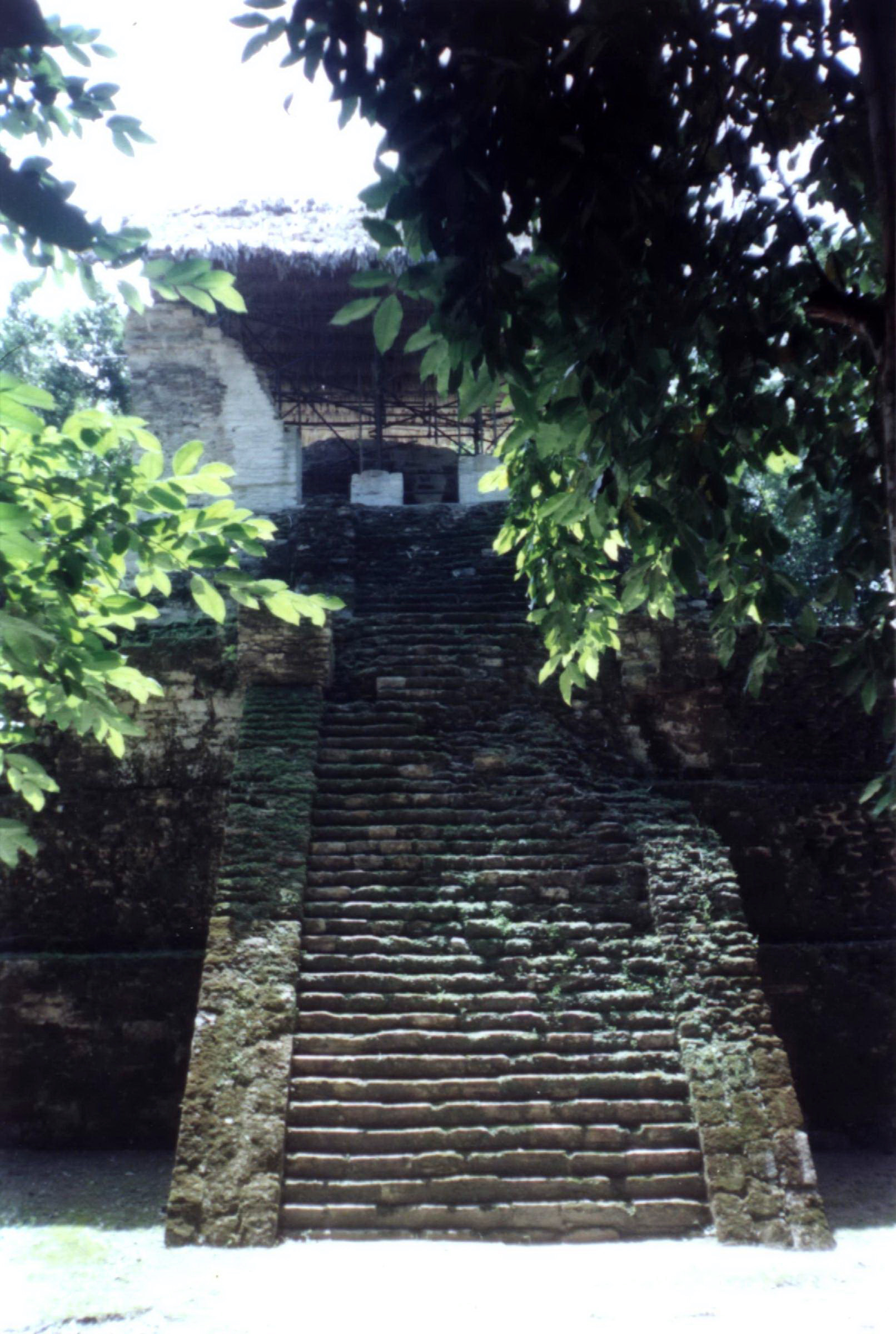
Building C at Topoxté

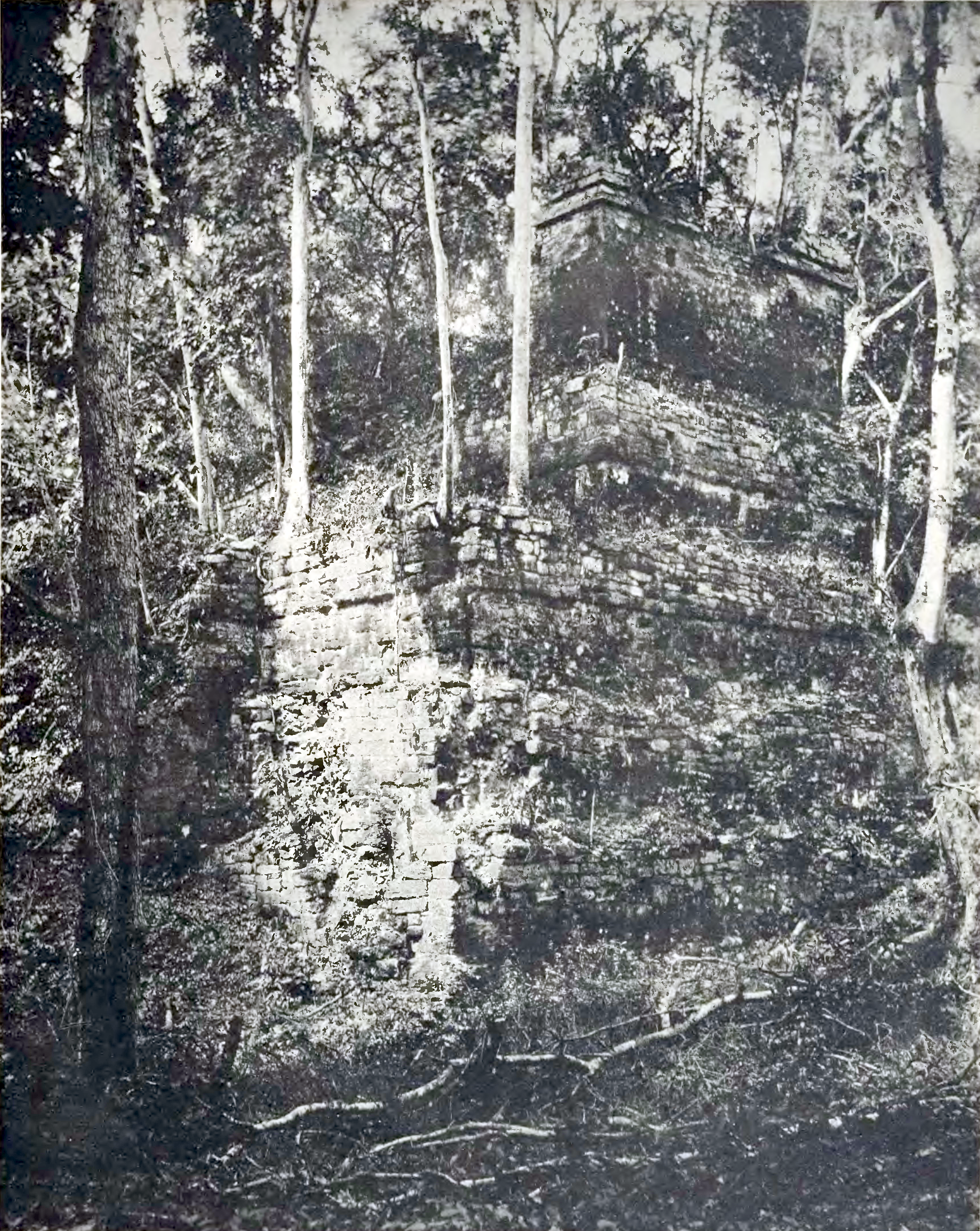
Rear view of Building C as published by Teoberto Maler in 1908

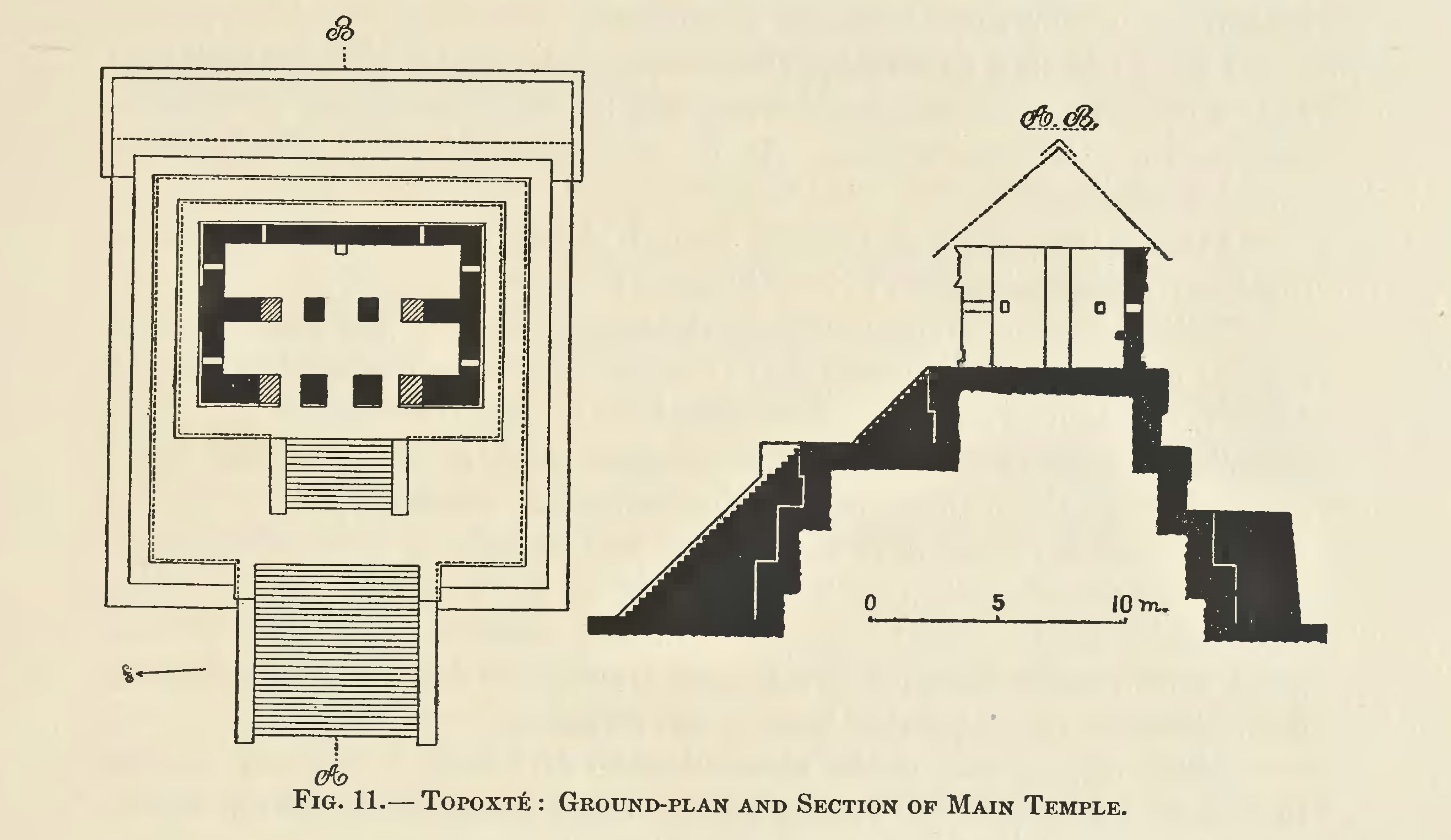
Maler's plan of Building C

Building C is perhaps the best example of Postclassic architecture in the Petén region. It is located on the east side of the Main Plaza and is a stepped pyramid with three platforms, measuring 2.45 metres (8.0 ft), 2.2 metres (7.2 ft) and 2.5 metres (8.2 ft) high. The pyramid has a steep stairway ascending from the plaza on the west side of the building at an angle of 49°.

A fourth level is built upon the three platforms, with its own access stairway climbing from the top platform. This fourth level supported the temple building, which originally had walls approximately 4.8 metres (16 ft) high and 0.8 metres (31 in) thick. A broken stela fragment measuring 69 by 50 centimetres (27 by 20 in) by 23 centimetres (9.1 in) was found on the third tier, in front of the access stairway to the temple. It was associated with an offering of human bones (Burial 22).

The temple building was divided into two rooms covering an area of 10.9 by 6.8 metres (36 by 22 ft). The rooms were divided by a wall and two columns, and a 10-centimetre (3.9 in) step. The entrance to the temple is divided into three 1-metre (3.3 ft) wide sections divided by two columns. The stone construction was originally covered with stucco or whitewash. The building was damaged in modern times by two looters' pits, one at the base and one near the top. During investigation of the upper pit, Burial 21 was discovered. A second burial (Burial 23) was found in the third tier of the pyramid during restoration work.

Building C was built upon a previous structure dating to the end of the Late Preclassic or the beginning of the Early Classic. This earlier building was enlarged in the Postclassic.

==== Other structures ====
Building A is the only large building that can be assigned to the Late Classic. It was formed of a three-tier stepped platform supporting a small temple, perhaps sporting a roof comb. This building was badly damaged in the Postclassic when it was quarried for building stone for later buildings, completely stripping away the facade.

Building B is a long, north-facing palace-type structure standing on the south side of the Main Plaza.

Building D and Building E are built on the same platform on the east side of the Main Plaza, immediately to the north of Building C. Building D is a rectangular platform with rounded corners.

Structure E occupied the same platform as Building D. The structure was part of a temple complex. It shows two construction phases with the earlier taking place around 1200.

Building G is a small square structure on the north side of the Main Plaza. It faces southward onto the plaza.

Structure J is a low platform in the middle of the plaza opposite the stairway of Structure C. It is poorly preserved.

Building K is on the east side of the Main Plaza and once supported two Late Classic stelae.

==== Burials ====
As of 1995, 26 burials had been excavated at Topoxte. Two burials were interred in rough cists, two were interred in caves and one in a funerary urn. Eighteen burials were individual, four were multiple burials and four consisted of single burials with additional skulls interred with the deceased.

Burial 1 dates to the Postclassic. It was excavated in a possible residential patio among a group of small buildings at the south end of Topoxte island. It was possibly interred in a seated position. The remains belong to an adult male aged between 15 and 25 years old and were found buried with fragments of tortoiseshell.

Burial 2 was found in the south of Topoxte island. The remains belong to an adult male between 25 and 35 years old and were oriented north–south. Associated offerings included an earthenware bowl and a necklace consisting of four shell or bone beads. This burial dates to the Late Classic.

Burial 3 was found in the south of Topoxte island. The remains are those of an adult male aged from 25 to 35 years old and are mixed with the bones of a second individual. Associated offerings include two obsidian prismatic blades. The burial dates to the Early Classic.

Burial 4 was excavated from an artificial terrace near the northwest corner of Building A and dates to the Postclassic. The remains belonged to an adult female between 17 and 25 years old. She was buried with a broken copper disk and a piece of flint.

Burial 5 was excavated from a residential area in the northwest of Topoxte island. The remains were those of a child between 2 and 4 years old, possibly buried in a seated position. A shell bead was found under the skull. The age of the remains is uncertain, but they may date to the Preclassic.

Burial 6 was partially excavated from the extreme southeastern edge of the island, the remains are those of an adult and were apparently interred outside of the limits of the urban area of the site. The gender of the remains is uncertain but they have been tentatively identified as female and date to the Early Classic.

Burial 7 was found in a residential area in the northern part of Topoxte island. Only about 10% of the remains were recovered, they belong to an adult tentatively identified as male. The remains were buried with the head aligned towards the south and were associated with two pieces of worked flint. They date to the Postclassic.

Burial 8 dates to the Postclassic. It was excavated from the western edge of Building E, which is located by the Main Plaza. The remains are those of an adult male between 17 and 25 years old. A second skull was found interred with the burial, belonging to an adult female of similar age to the principal remains.

Burial 9 dates to the Postclassic. The bones are those of an adult male between 17 and 25 years old. The remains were interred with a prismatic blade of grey obsidian, they were found in a columned building in the extreme north of Topoxte island.

Burial 10 was found in the northern extreme of Topoxte island, the remains are those of an adult male and date to the Postclassic. Interred with the deceased were a worked flint and a piece of slate.

Burial 11 was associated with an altar platform to the west of Building E, in the Main Plaza. The remains are those of an adult of indeterminate gender, between 15 and 25 years old. Two pieces of flint were buried with the remains, which date to the Postclassic.

Burial 12 is located to the south of a low residential platform, upon an artificial terrace in the north of Topoxte island. The burial contains the remains of two or possibly three individuals. Various items were associated with the burial, such as a fragment of a flint knife and another of grey obsidian, and several pieces of bone needle. One of the skeletons belongs to an adult female between 17 and 25 years of age, the other is that of a child of between 5 and 8 years of age, they both date to the Preclassic.

Burial 13 was found to the south of Building G, in the Main Plaza, and may have been interred at the time that the plaza was levelled. The remains are those of an adult, possibly female, between 25 and 40 years old. The burial is associated with several pieces of flint and obsidian and dates to the Early Classic.

Burial 14 was interred near the northeastern shore of Topoxte island, near a residential complex. It consists of two individuals, an adult male between 17 and 25 years old and a seated adult female between 25 and 35 years old. The burial dates from the Postclassic Period.

Burial 15 was found to the north of Building H, on an artificial elevation near the centre of Topoxte island, among mixed residential and non-residential buildings. The remains are those of an adult, tentatively identified as female and of unknown age. The burial dates to the Late Classic. Associated offerings included an inverted ceramic vessel, a flint projectile point, a grey obsidian prismatic blade, a shell disk, two perforated ceramic disks and various other pieces of worked flint. Some of these items may actually be rubbish dumped on top of the burial, with only the inverted vessel being a definite offering associated with the human remains. The burial dates to the Late Classic.

Burial 16 was found under a patio in the central area of Topoxte island, to the east of some relatively tall structures. The remains are those of an adult, possibly male, aged between 17 and 25 years old. The burial dates to the Postclassic.

Burial 17 were excavated from an artificial terrace in east of the centre of Topoxte island, immediately to the southeast of a residential complex. The burial contains the remains of three individuals. The first was an adult male over 30 years old, buried in a seated position with a couple of associated pieces of flint. The remains date to the Postclassic. The second individual was buried prone, oriented northwards, they have been tentatively identified as a male of unknown age. He was interred in the Late Classic with a ceramic vessel, a ceramic bowl and a ceramic disk. The third individual is represented only by a skull, which belonged to a child of between 2 and 5 years of age. The skull was associated with various Early Classic artifacts but it is unclear if it dates from the same period or was deposited during the Postclassic.

Burial 18 was found close to the junction of the lowest tier of Building C with the main stairway of the pyramid. The burial dates to the Postclassic and consists of three individuals. They are of indeterminate gender, one being aged between 12 and 18 years old, the second being aged between 16 and 25 years old and the other being aged between 25 and 35 years old. The entire burial dates to the Postclassic.

Burial 19 was found in the southern part of Topoxte island, under the platform supporting Building A. The burial consists of two individuals and two additional skulls. Both individuals are adult males of between 17 and 25 years of age, with offerings consisting of a shell and various pieces of worked stone including flint, limestone and jasper. The entire burial has been dated to the Protoclassic (AD 0–250).

Burial 20 was located in a system of artificial caves in the southern part of the island, near Building A. It consists of an adult of indeterminate age and gender associated with a great deal of mixed rubbish. The remains date to the Protoclassic.

Burial 21 was found under the temple at the summit of Building C when archaeologists investigated a looters' tunnel. It dates to the Postclassic and was an adult male aged between 35 and 50 years of age, lying horizontally with an east–west orientation. There were few graves goods recovered, a monochrome vessel with a lid containing three small pieces of jade, a piece of quartz crystal, a shell bead and some pieces of turquoise.

Burial 22 is a collection of disarticulated longbones, belonging to a young child of between 2½ and 4 years old, buried at the base of a stela on the third tier of Building C.

Burial 23 was found inserted into the east side of the third tier of Building C. The burial was contained in a cist, with the remains aligned north–south. The skull was missing and the burial had no associated grave goods. The remains belonged to an adult female of between 23 and 30 years of age and date to the Postclassic.

Burial 24 was excavated between Buildings C and D, to the north of Stela 4 and Altar 4. The bones are those of an adult of unknown gender between 17 and 25 years old. The remains had a flint knife under the lower spine and date to the Postclassic.

Burial 25 consists of dispersed human bones of both sexes, scattered on an artificial terrace to the east of Building H and surrounded by residential buildings. The remains have been dated to the Postclassic but could be a Late Preclassic burial disturbed at a later date.

Burial 26 was found on the southern shore of Topoxte island. The remains are those of an infant aged between 2 and 5 years old. The bones were contained within an urn and the burial is dated to the Postclassic.

== See also ==
- Ixlu
