= Chinamita =

Former Maya nation from ca 16th cent to ca 1700

Coordinates: 16.712°N 89.236°W

Territory of the Chinamita
- ca 16th cent–ca 1700
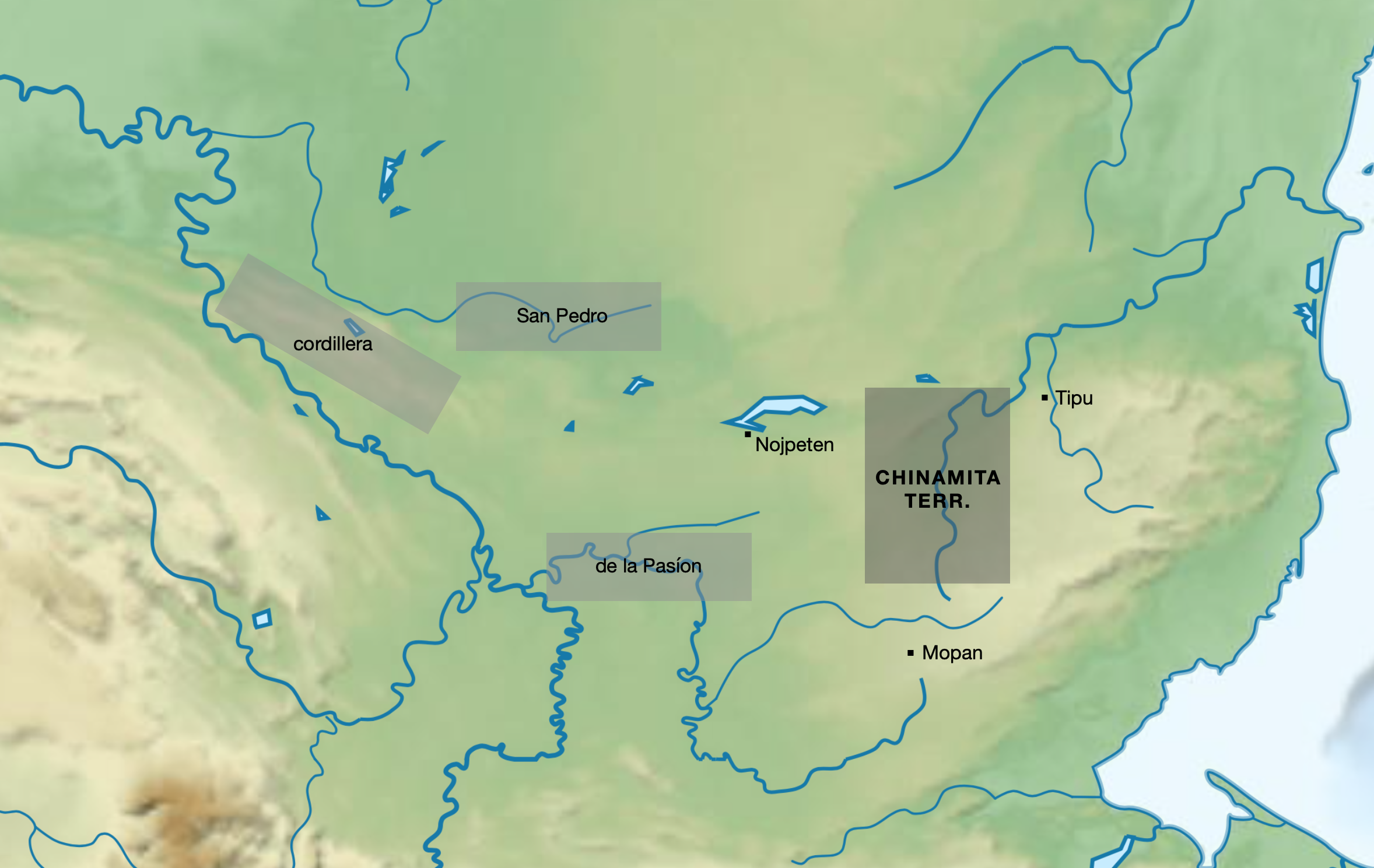
- Location of the Chinamita Territory in the 17th century / most commonly accepted location in dark grey, with alternative ones in light grey / 2023 map based on scholarship / via Commons
- Status: Dissolved
- Capital: Tulumki / likely
- Common languages: Mopan Mayan / likely
- Religion: Maya polytheism
- Demonyms: Chinamita; Tulumki
- Government: Confederacy of settlements with aristocratic and theocratic features / possibly
- Historical era: Spanish to Precolonial / likely
  - Established: ca 16th cent
  - Disestablished: ca 1700
- Today part of: Belize / likely Guatemala / certain
- Founding and dissolution dates per Jones 1998, pp. 19–20 and Palka 2005, pp. 1–2. Capital per Rice & Rice 2009, p. 13 and Jones 1998, pp. 19–20. Common language per Rice & Rice 2009, pp. 12–13 and Jones 1998, pp. 20–21, though see Thompson 1977, p. 13 for dissent. Demonym per Rice & Rice 2009, p. 13 and Jones 1998, pp. 20–21, 433–434. Government per Jones 1998, pp. 20–22.

The Chinamitas or Tulumkis (Nahuatl chinamitl, Mopan tulumki) were likely a Mopan Maya people who constituted the former Chinamita Territory, an early Columbian polity of the Maya Lowlands, likely in present-day Belize and Guatemala. In the early 17th century, the territory probably lay along the Mopan River in the eastern Petén Basin and neighbouring portions of western Belize, being thereby situated east of the Itza of Nojpetén, south of the Yaxhá and Sacnab lakes, and west of Tipuj.

== Etymology ==
The term Chinamita is derived from the Nahuatl chinamitl, meaning "cane hedge". This was equivalent to the Mopan term tulum ki, meaning "wall of agave", which was the name of the Chinamita capital. Spanish chronicler Juan de Villagutierre Soto-Mayor described the Chinamitas and Tulunquies as two distinct peoples; however, chinamitl is merely the Nahuatl translation of the Mayan tulum ki.

== Territory ==
The territory is most commonly thought to have been situated along the Mopan River in northeastern Guatemala and southwestern Belize, wedged between Nojpeten and Tipu, and to have thereby been subordinate to or formed part of the Mopan Territory. (Note: However, Thompson 1977, p. 13 notes that the aforementioned location of the territory "is surely incorrect; eastern and southeastern Petén, fully explored by the Spaniards [by 1697], contained no such group [ie no Chinamitas; m]oreover, moated and fenced strongholds [such as Tulumki] are typical of western, not eastern, Petén." Notably, in 1698, after the fall of Nojpetén, the Itza reportedly told the Spanish that the Chinamita Territory lay nine days to the east of the Itza capital (Jones 1998, pp. xix, 20).) However, some scholars have proposed that the territory rather lay in northwestern Guatemala. (Note: Caso Barrera 2006, first map, and para. 5 locates the territory "near the Xocmo River [ie Río de la Pasión]," while Spores 1986, p. 72 places it on Río San Pedro, and Thompson 1977, p. 13 on the cordillera between the Usumacinta and San Pedro. Palka 2005, pp. 1–2 seems to place the territory in northwestern Guatemala too, noting that by the early 18th century, at least some residents of the former Chinamita Territory were known to have settled on the Usumacinta. However, Jones 1998, p. 432 disagrees with all the aforementioned, noting they are "surely incorrect in locating the Chinamitas southwest rather than east of Nojpeten." Note Caso Barrera 2006, para. 5 further proposes the territory formed part of the Xocmo Territory, whose residents were "probably a dissident Itza faction established near the Xocmo River." See Caso Barrera 2006, first map and Köhler & Esponda Jimeno 2004, p. 122 for identification of Xocmo River as Río de la Pasión.)

The Chinamitas' principal settlement was a town called Tulumki, and the Chinamita people were also referred to as Tulumkis or Tulunquies. Tulumki was said to have a population of 8,000 in the early 17th century; (Note: The Maya counted using a vigesimal system; the cited population of 8,000 is equal to 20x20x20. It is probable that the 8,000 quoted merely signifies "a great many" (Thompson 1977, loc. 500).) the population was said to include both male and female Spaniards who had been captured by the Chinamitas. The town was described as being defended by a moat and a maguey hedge, and was accessed via a narrow entranceway.

== Relations with the Itza ==
Itza–Chinamita relations were quite strained, as the former "waged incessant wars against" the latter, while the Chinamitas were reciprocally hostile towards their Itza neighbours and their allies. In 1618, Itza warriors informed the Franciscan missionaries Bartolomé de Fuensalida and Juan de Orbita that they always travelled armed when visiting their allies in Tipuj, for fear of encountering their fierce Chinamita enemies. According to Fuensalida, the Chinamitas had a reputation for being cannibals. When Franciscan friar Andrés de Avendaño y Loyola visited the Itza in 1696, he understood the Tuluncies formed a part of the Itza kingdom.

== Legacy ==
As of 2009, the territory and its residents remained "virtually unknown materially and geopolitically except for documentary references or linguistic reconstructions." Along with residents of the former Mopan Territory, the Chinamitas are presumed ancestors of the modern Mopan Maya people of Belize and Guatemala.

== Notes and references ==
=== Full citations ===
- Caso Barrera, Laura (2006). "Guerre et factionnalisme entre les Itzaes durant la periode coloniale". Civilisations. 55: 52–69. ISSN 2032-0442.
- Cecil, Leslie G. (August 2004). "Inductively coupled plasma emission spectroscopy and Postclassic Petén slipped pottery: an examination of pottery wares, social identity and trade". Archaeometry. 43 (3): 385–404. doi:10.1111/j.1475-4754.2004.00164.x.
- Jones, Grant D. (1998). The Conquest of the Last Maya Kingdom. Stanford, California, US: Stanford University Press. ISBN 978-0-8047-3522-3.
- Köhler, Axel M.; Esponda Jimeno, Victor M. (2004). "Choles y chortíes de Karl Sapper, 1907". LiminaR. 2 (1): 114–142. doi:10.29043/LIMINAR.V2I1.147.
- Palka, Joel (Winter 2005). "Rock Paintings and Lacandon Maya Sacred Landscapes". The PARI Journal. V (3): 1–7. ISSN 1531-5398. Archived from the original on 14 August 2023.
- Rice, Prudence M.; Rice, Don S., eds. (2009). The Kowoj: Identity, Migration, and Geopolitics in Late Postclassic Petén, Guatemala. Mesoamerican Worlds. Boulder, Colorado, US: University Press of Colorado. ISBN 978-0-87081-930-8. OCLC 225875268.
- Simmons, Scott E. (1995). "Maya Resistance, Maya Resolve: The tools of autonomy from Tipu, Belize". Ancient Mesoamerica. 6 (2). New York, US: Cambridge University Press: 135–146. doi:10.1017/s0956536100002145. ISSN 0956-5361. OCLC 88427811.
- Spores, Ronald, ed. (1986). Ethnohistory. Supplement to the Handbook of Middle American Indians. Vol. 4. Austin, Texas, US: University of Texas Press. ISBN 0-2927-7604-7. OL 18331655W.
- Thompson, John E. (1977). "A Proposal for Constituting a Maya Subgroup, Cultural and Linguistic, in the Petén and Adjacent Regions". In Grant D. Jones (ed.). Anthropology and History in Yucatán. The Texas Pan American Series. Austin, Texas, US: University of Texas Press. doi:10.7560/703148. ISBN 978-0-292-76678-5. OCLC 2202479.
