= Kejache =

Maya people in northern Guatemala

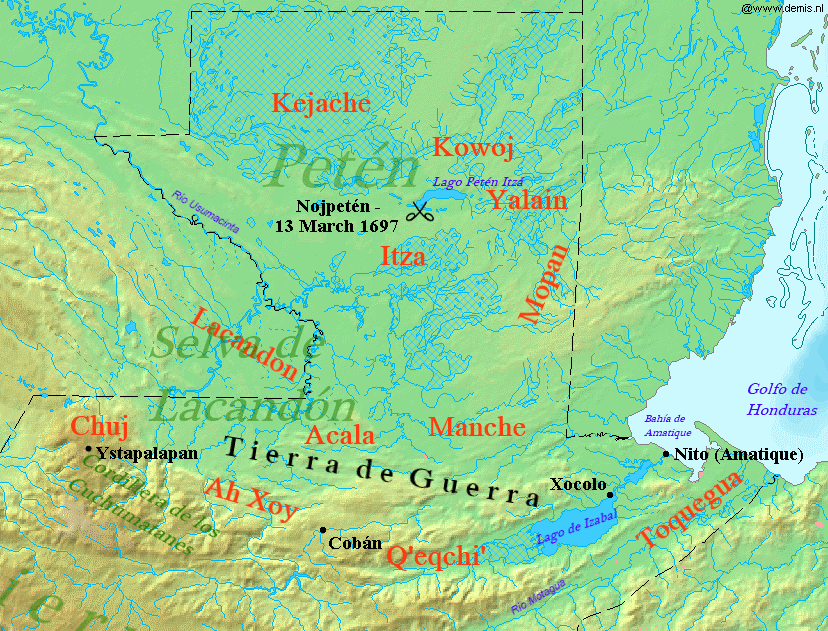
Map of the northern lowlands of Guatemala at the time of Spanish contact, showing the location of the Kejache province

The Kejache (/keˈχätʃe/) (sometimes spelt Kehache, Quejache, Kehach, Kejach or Cehache) were a Maya people in northern Guatemala at the time of Spanish contact in the 17th century. The Kejache territory was located in the Petén Basin in a region that takes in parts of both Guatemala and Mexico. Linguistic evidence indicates that the Kejache shared a common origin with the neighbouring Itzas to their southeast and the Kejache may have occupied the general region since the Classic period (c. AD 250–900). The Kejache were initially contacted by conquistador Hernán Cortés in 1525; they were later in prolonged contact with the Spanish as the latter opened a route southwards towards Lake Petén Itzá.

== Territory ==
The Kejache occupied a region that is now crossed by the border between Guatemala and the Mexican state of Campeche, in an area measuring approximately 40 by 100 kilometres (25 by 62 mi) extending from lakes Silvituk and Moku in Mexico southwards towards Uaxactun in Guatemala. The Kejache held a province that lay between the Itza kingdom centred on the city of Nojpetén and what, after the initial stages of the Spanish conquest, became the Spanish-held Yucatán to the north. The Kejache were bordered immediately to the north by the territory of the Acalan, a Chontal Maya people. The precise geopolitical extent of the Kejache is poorly understood, and no archaeological surveys of the Kejache territory have taken place. The Kejache territory consisted of a region of low hills with wide valleys that form swamplands during the rainy season, the region is also characterised by a number of small lakes, such as Lake Moku, Lake Silvituk and Chan Laguna.

== Culture ==
The Kejache, as described by the Spanish, were poorer than neighbouring Maya peoples, using wood and thatch as building materials and lacking material resources. Kejache weapons consisted of short spears and bows and arrows; apparently they did not use shields, unlike their neighbours. The Kejache cultivated maize, black beans, squash and turkeys. The Kejache traded with the Acalan Maya to their northwest, exchanging cotton clothing for salt.

By the mid-17th century the Kejache were important intermediaries between the Itza and Yucatán. The Putun Acalan subgroup of the Kejache had previously traded directly with the Itza but had been relocated by the Spanish. The remaining Kejache, decimated by disease and subject to the intense attentions of Spanish missionaries, were no longer able to supply the Itza directly and became middlemen instead.

=== Language and etymology ===
Kejache was the name by which they identified themselves to others. The Kejache spoke the Yucatec Maya language, and the name kejache is derived from the Yucatec words kej meaning "deer" and ach, which was a suffix that may have indicated the abundance of the animals. The Kejache territory was referred to as Mazatlan in the Nahuatl language of the Aztecs; the Spanish conquistador Bernal Díaz del Castillo interpreted the "land of the Mazatecas" as the "town or lands of deer". The Kejache shared many surnames with the neighbouring Itzas and, despite the later hostility between the two peoples, it is likely that they had a common origin.

== History ==
Although the Kejache seem to have had a common origin with the Itza, possibly as far back as the Late Classic period (c. AD 600–900), the approximate date of their division into separate peoples is unknown. The Kejache separation may have occurred due to either continued Itza migration to Petén during the Postclassic period (c. 900–1697) or because internal warfare caused them to divide. It is possible that the Kejache had occupied their territory since the Classic period and they may have been descendants of the inhabitants of the prominent Maya cities in the region, such as Calakmul and the cities of the Río Bec zone.

The Kejache are likely to have occupied the Petén region of what is now northern Guatemala for a considerable time before being displaced by Itza expansion into the area north and northwest of the Itza kingdom. The Kejache province was frequently at war with the Itza and the two territories were separated by a deserted no-man's land. The Kejache are believed to have lacked a centralised political structure, although their capital was said to be Mazatlan (as referred to in Nahuatl by Aztec merchants). Ten Kejache towns are mentioned in Spanish colonial documents, including Tiac and Yaxuncabil, mentioned by Hernán Cortés.

=== Spanish conquest ===
Spanish conquistador Hernán Cortés passed through Kejache territory in 1525 en route to Honduras and reported that the Kejache towns were situated in easily defensible locations and were often fortified. One of these was built on a rocky outcrop near a lake and a river that fed into it. The town was fortified with a wooden palisade and was surrounded by a moat. Cortés reported that the town of Tiac was even larger and was fortified with walls, watchtowers and earthworks; the town itself was divided into three individually fortified districts. Tiac was said to have been at war with the unnamed smaller town. The Kejache claimed that their towns were fortified against the attacks of their aggressive Itza neighbours. In 1531 Alonso Dávila crossed the north of Kejache territory in search of an adequate base of operations for conquest. A portion of the northern Kejache territory was given in encomienda to Miguel Sánchez Cerdán in May 1543.

By 1600, the Kejache population is estimated to have been around 7000, distributed between 10–20 settlements. By this time, the Kejache were under pressure not just from the Itzá, but also from the Lakandon Ch'ol to the southwest, and Christianised Chontal to the west. The northern part of the Kejache territory received a steady stream of Maya refugees fleeing the Spanish province of Yucatán. By the 17th century the Kejache were acting as middlemen between Spanish Yucatán and the independent Maya of central Petén, although the presence of Spanish missionaries among them provoked hostility from the Itza, and simultaneously exposed them to the danger of epidemic diseases contracted from the Europeans.

The Kejache had a number of well-fortified towns built along the principal trade route from Campeche to Lake Petén Itzá. By the first decades of the 17th century, the Kejache town of Tzuktok became the southern frontier of Spanish missionary efforts from Yucatán. By that time, Tzuktok had a mixed population of native Kejache and Yucatec refugees. The Spanish built a road through the Kejache territory from Campeche on the west coast of the Yucatán Peninsula and the Spanish established missions at the Kejache towns of Ichbalche and Tzuktok. By the last decade of the 17th century, the Spanish also had a priest at Chuntuki, also on the new road (or camino real – "royal road").

After the fall of the Itza to the Spanish invaders in 1697, the surviving Kejache fled with Itza and Kowoj refugees into the Lacandon forest, where they became the ancestors of the modern Lacandon people.
