= Cheles (chiefdom) =

Mayan chiefdom of the Yucatán Peninsula

Cheles was the name of a Mayan chiefdom of the Yucatán Peninsula, in the present day southeastern Mexico.

Its demise occurred after the arrival of the Spanish conquest of the Yucatán and subsequent colonization efforts in the Yucatán Peninsula region in the 16th century.

== See also ==
- Spanish conquest of the Aztec Empire
- Spanish conquest of Petén — southern Maya.
