= Nixtun Chʼichʼ =

Itza Maya archaeological site in Guatemala

Coordinates: 16.948°N 89.931°W

- Interactive map of Nixtun Chʼichʼ
- Cultures: Maya
- Location: Central, Petén
- Region: Guatemala

History
- Built: Preclassic Period
- Abandoned: 1734

Nixtun-Chʼichʼ is an Itza Maya archaeological site in Petén Department, Guatemala. It has an urban grid with fairly well ordered streets and avenues dated to around 2500 years ago. This is one of the earliest urban grids in the Americas and likely emerged as the ancient Maya developed more complex forms of political organization. It was likely a means to regulate and perhaps dominate the inhabitants. Nevertheless, the grid system at Nixtun-Chʼichʼ did not catch on and is not seen in later Maya cities.

== Location ==
Nixtun-Chʼichʼ stands on the western edge of Lake Petén Itzá. It is bordered by the lake to the south and east; by karstic hills to the north; and uneven terrain to the west. The area of the site is relatively flat, but it was built upon a low ridge that extends east to west. Maya sites are generally dispersed, but Nixtun-Chʼichʼ was laid out with an urban grid. It also includes an axis urbis composed of a row of over 15 buildings extending east to west. The axis and grid were established in the Middle Preclassic period (800-400 BC). The site also has major construction in the Late Preclassic period (400 BC-AD 200) after which the site appears to have suffered a decline—a trend seen in many sites in central Petén. The site was also occupied in the Late Classic through the Colonial period (AD 600-1734).

== San Jerónimo Mission, Petén, Guatemala ==
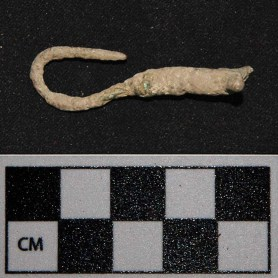
A fishhook found at Nixtun Chʼichʼ

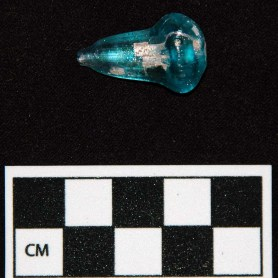
A glass bead found at Nixtun Chʼichʼ

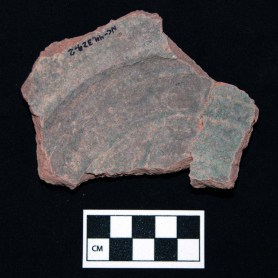
An olive jar sherd found at Nixtun Chʼichʼ

== Preclassic period ==
During the 1995, 2006-2008, and 2013-2014 seasons at Nixtun-Chʼich, Proyecto Itza encountered Preclassic period (ca.1000 BC-AD 200) constructions in nearly every test unit excavated. It was clear that the site's most substantial constructions occurred before AD 200. In 2013-2014, Proyecto Itza remapped the site and found that it contained an urban grid. In 2015, Proyecto Itza began to intensively investigate the Preclassic period occupations along with its work on the Postclassic period.

== Late postclassic and colonial period ==
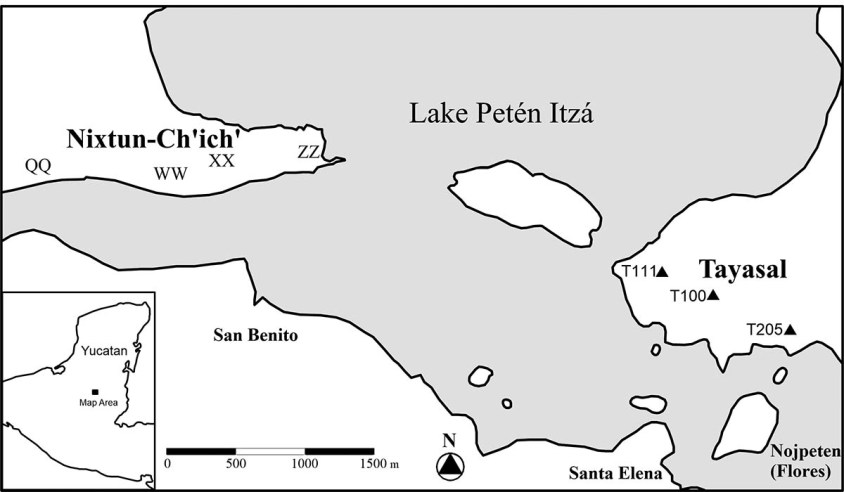
A map to portray different sections among the excavation

Postclassic and Colonial period settlements have been found at Nixtun-Chʼichʼ in Sector QQ (Middle to Late Postclassic period), Sector WW (Middle to Late Postclassic period), Sector XX (Contact or Colonial period), and Sector ZZ (Colonial period). See map below.

== Underwater Archaeology ==
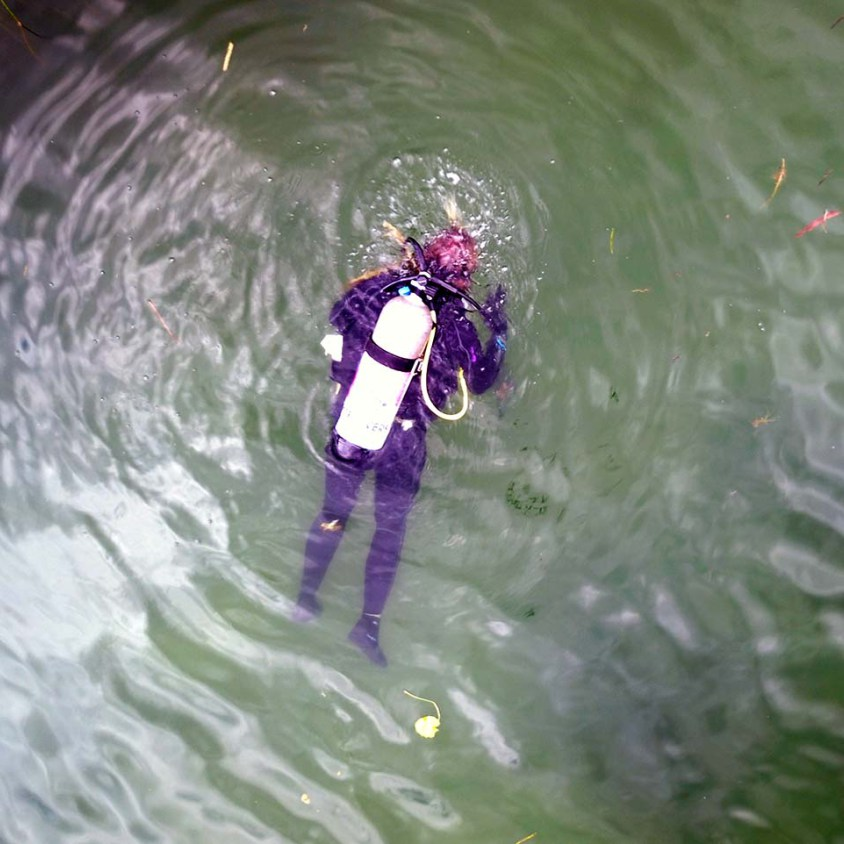
A diver on Lake Peten near Nixtun Chʼichʼ

In 2015, Proyecto Itza initiated a program of underwater archaeology on Lake Petén Itzá and began sampling in 2018. The goal of this work is to discern deposits in the lake left as offerings or accidentally dropped into the lake as a result of trade. Proyecto Itza has identified several areas that "look like" ports at Nixtun-Chʼichʼ and we will test this hypothesis though underwater sampling.

== Nixtun Chʼichʼ documentary ==
In 2017, Proyecto Itza began filming a documentary about the development of city planning and the state at Nixtun-Chʼichʼ.

== News Coverage ==
=== Media Coverage, 2015 ===
- ARCHAEOLOGY: World Roundup
- NATIONAL GEOGRAPHIC ESPAÑA: El plano en cuadrícula para controlar a la población
- NBC NEWS: Archaeologists Find Ancient Maya City With a Modern Grid Layout
- LIVE SCIENCE: Bloody Ancient Arrowhead Reveals Maya 'Life Force' Ceremony
- INTERNATIONAL BUSINESS TIMES: Ancient Mayan city layout followed grid pattern 'indicating powerful ruler'
- LIVE SCIENCE: Early Urban Planning: Ancient Mayan City Built on Grid
- HYPERALLERGIC: Archaeologist Discovers Ancient Mayan City Built on a Grid
- ARCHAEOLOGY AIA: "Shiny" Maya City Was Laid Out on a Grid
- PRENSA LIBRE: Revelan nuevos detalles de la ciudad maya de Nixtun-Chʼichʼ
- ODISHA SUN TIMES: Ancient Mayan city unearthed
- MUNDO CHAPIN: Arqueólogos encuentran nuevas pistas en Nixtun-Chʼichʼ, Petén
- Przed Kolumbem: Nietypowy plan majańskiego miasta Nixtun Chʼichʼ (Peten, Gwatemala)

=== Media Coverage, 2014 ===
- Pugh Interview with RFCUNY
- Prensa Libre: Hallan cementerio colonial itzá
- Cultural Entanglements: Early Globalization in the Americas
- National Geographic Espana: Sacan a la luz dos alt ares mayas en Guatemala
- Ancient Mayan Altars, Sculpted Artwork Discovered in Guatemala
- Maya Council House Unearthed in Guatemala.
- Ancient Maya Altars, Sculpted Artwork Found in Guatemala
- Ancient Maya Altars, Artwork Discovered in Guatemala
- Archaeologist Discusses New Maya Ruins Uncovered in Guatemala
- Ancient Mayan altars, sculpted artwork discovered in Guatemala
- Χώρος τελετών των Μάγια ανακαλύφθηκε στη Γουτεμάλα
- Znaleziono 'unieważnioną' majańską siedzibę władz
- Tiết lộ mới nhất về tòa nhà hội đồng của người Maya

== See also ==
- Tayasal (archaeological site)
- Zacpeten
