= San Pedro River (Guatemala) =

River in Guatemala and Mexico

San Pedro River/Río San Pedro
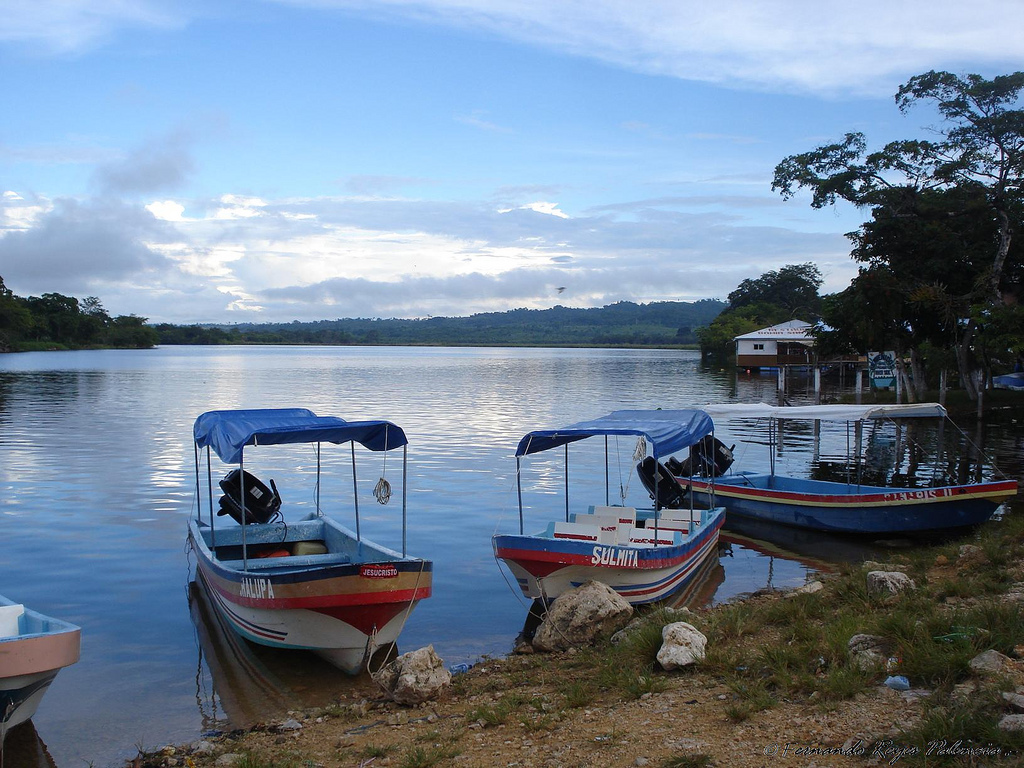
- San Pedro River, at El Naranjo, Petén

Location
- Countries: Guatemala and Mexico

Physical characteristics
- Source
  - location: Guatemala (El Petén)
  - coordinates: 17.134803°N 89.902668°W
  - elevation: 200 m (660 ft)
- Mouth
  - location: Tributary of the Usumacinta river
- Length: 186 km (116 mi)(in Guatemala)
- Discharge
  - average: 52.9 m^{3}/s (1,870 cu ft/s) (at San Pedro Mactún)

The Río San Pedro is a river of Guatemala and Mexico. Its sources are located in the Guatemalan department of El Petén at 17.134803°N 89.902668°W. The length of the river in Guatemala is 186 km (116 mi). The river flows westwards until it reaches the Mexican border and crosses into the state of Tabasco at 17.279636°N 90.987697°W. From there it continues northwest and joins the Usumacinta River. The Guatemalan part of the San Pedro river basin covers an area of 14,335 square kilometres (5,535 sq mi). The river has red mangroves.
