= Nojpetén =

Capital city of the Mayan kingdom of Petén Itzá; now Flores, Guatemala

Coordinates: 16°55′47″N 89°53′30″W

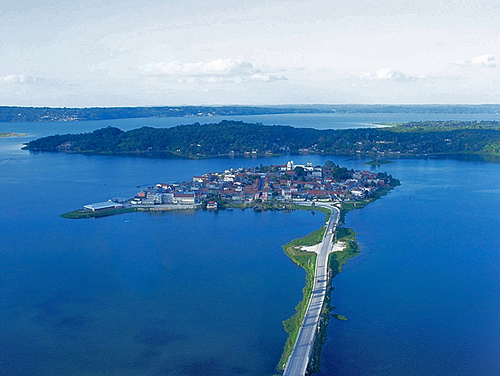
The island that was the site of Nojpetén is now developed as the modern town of Flores

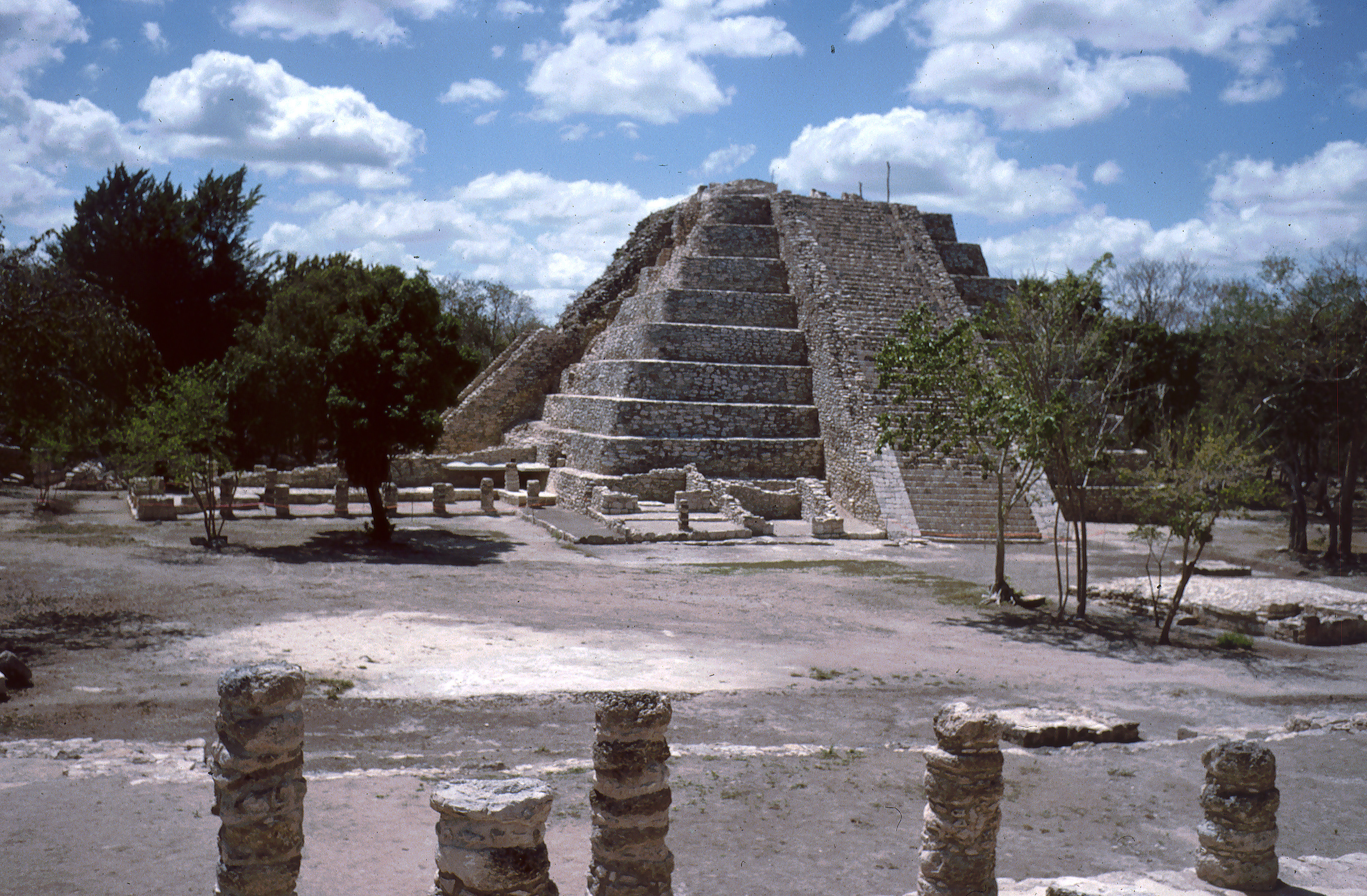
The main pyramid at Nojpetén would have looked very similar to the Castillo at Mayapan

Nojpetén (also spelled Noh Petén, and also known as Tayasal and Tah Itza) was the capital city of the Itza Maya kingdom of Petén Itzá. It was located on an island in Lake Petén Itzá in the modern department of Petén in northern Guatemala. The island is now occupied by the modern town of Flores, the capital of the Petén department, and has had uninterrupted occupation since pre-Columbian times. Nojpetén had defensive walls built upon the low ground of the island, which may have been hastily constructed by the Itza at a time when they felt threatened either by the encroaching Spanish or by other Maya groups.

== Etymology ==
Writing many years after his journey across Petén, conquistador Bernal Díaz del Castillo called the city Tayasal; this appears to have been a Hispanicisation of the Itza language ta itza ("at the place of the Itza"). The Itza king Kan Ek' referred to the city by the name Nojpetén when he spoke to the Spanish in 1698. Nojpetén, from the Itza noj peten, means "great island".

== Foundation ==
Earliest archaeological traces on the island date back to 900–600 BC, with a major expansion of the settlement occurring around 250–400 AD. Ethnohistoric documents claim the founding of Nojpetén in the mid-15th century AD. These relate that Nojpetén was founded when the Itza fled south around 1441–1446, after they were deposed by the Xiu Maya at Mayapan. When they settled on the island, they divided their new capital into four quarters based upon lineage groups.

== Description ==
...Tayasal is on a small island surrounded by water, and unless [the natives] go by canoe, they cannot enter by land; and they whitewash the houses and temples so they may be seen from more than two leagues distant...

— Bernal Díaz del Castillo, describing Nojpetén in Chapter CLXXVIII of his Historia verdadera de la conquista de la Nueva España

Nojpetén was closely packed with buildings that included temples, palaces and thatched houses. Approximately 2,000 people are estimated to have lived in the city, in an estimated 200 houses. The modern street plan of Flores is likely to have been inherited from pre-Columbian Nojpetén, with a quadripartite division by principal streets running north–south and east–west that intersect at the summit, occupied by the modern plaza and catholic church.

In 1698 Spanish accounts describe the city as having had twenty-one temples, the largest of these (which the Spanish called a castillo) had a square base measuring 16.5 metres (54 ft) on each side. It had nine stepped levels and faced northward; it appeared very similar in design to the principal pyramids at Chichen Itza and Mayapan in Yucatán. This was about half the size of the Mayapan castillo; its nine levels may each have been less than 1 metre (3.3 ft) high; the pyramid would still have been imposing. It possibly had only one access stairway rather than the four radial stairways found in the examples in Yucatán. The pyramid was topped by a flat-roofed summit shrine that contained idols representing Itza gods. The dismantling of this pyramid would have required considerable effort but no mention of this is found in Spanish records.

When Spanish missionary Andrés de Avendaño y Loyola visited the city in early 1696, nine of the temples had recently been burnt during a Kowoj Maya attack and subsequently rebuilt; during the attack many houses had also been destroyed. Ritual ceramics, identified by the Spanish as idols, were arranged in pairs upon small benches throughout the city. The Spanish set about destroying the pagan idols after conquering the city.

== Conquest ==
Nojpetén fell to a Spanish assault in 1697; it was the capital of the last Maya kingdom to fall to the conquerors. Martín de Ursúa y Arismendi arrived at the western shore of Lake Petén Itzá in February 1697 with 235 Spanish soldiers and 120 native labourers. He launched an all-out assault using a large oar-powered attack boat on 10 March; the Spanish bombardment of the island caused heavy loss of life among the Itza defenders, who were forced to abandon the city.

The Spanish renamed Nojpetén as Nuestra Señora de los Remedios y San Pablo, Laguna del Itza ("Our Lady of Remedy and Saint Paul, Lake of the Itza"); It was often shortened to Remedios in colonial documents, or referred to simply as Petén, or as El Presidio ("the garrison"). In 1831 the government renamed it Flores after the Guatemalan head of state Cirilo Flores Estrada.

== Archaeology ==
In 2003–2004, archaeological excavations were carried out to accompany a major infrastructure project on the island to develop its water supply and sewage systems. The volume of the infrastructure excavations was such that they provided an opportunity to sample every street and avenue in the city, and its major alleyways. The archaeological analysis revealed a particularly dense occupation of the island extending back over a long period of time. The earliest occupation was identified on the highest part of the island, in front of what is now the departmental governor's offices, and dates as far back as the Middle Preclassic period, c. 900–600 BC. A chultun (Maya storage pit) was identified in the central part of the island that contained Preclassic ceramic remains dating to the Middle to Late Preclassic periods (c. 600 BC – 250 AD). Although Preclassic remains were relatively scarce, by the Early Classic period (c. 250 – 400 AD) the site experienced considerable expansion.

== See also ==
- Tayasal (archaeological site)
- Nixtun Ch'ich'
- Zacpeten
