= José Torralba =

Governor-General of the Philippines

José Torralba Rios

36th Governor-General of the Philippines
- In office 4 February 1715 – 9 August 1717
- Monarch: Philip V of Spain
- Governor: (Viceroy of New Spain); Fernando de Alencastre, 1st Duke of Linares; Baltasar de Zúñiga, 1st Duke of Arión
- Preceded by: Martín de Ursúa
- Succeeded by: Fernando Manuel de Bustillo Bustamante y Rueda

Personal details
- Born: 3 April 1653 Granada, Province of Granada, Spain
- Died: 1726 (aged 72–73)
- Resting place: San Juan de Dios Church
- Profession: oidor

José Torralba Rios (1653-1726) was a Spanish oidor and licentiate who served as the 36th Governor-General of the Philippines. He is the eighth Governor-General of the Philippines from the Real Audiencia of Manila.

== Early life and career ==
Doctor José Torralba was born of Jose Torralba and Melchora de Rios in Granada, Province of Granada, Spain on 3 April 1653. Prior to being governor, he served as senior auditor (oidor) of the Real Audiencia of Manila, who put him in charge of military affairs. One of the cases given to him was the residencia of Juan Antonio Pimentel, Governor of Marianas (1709-1720). On 22 March 1710, four ships headed by Capts. Woodes Rogers and Edward Cooke landed in Umatac, Guam. The English were treated well by Governor Pimentel, and were able to be refreshed with food and other supplies, despite Joseph de Quiroga's (Sergeant major of Marianas) efforts to set up a war council in case the English did raze the island. Pimentel did not meet with the war council. In addition, the governor gave the English gifts. Beyond the knowledge of Pimentel, the English were privateers and one of their ships, the Batchelor, was actually the captured Manila galleon Nuestra Señora de la Encarnación y Desengaño. Pimentel explained to Martín de Ursúa, Governor-General of the Philippines, that the Marianas cannot be defended due to lack of resources and personnel. Torralba, who arrived in Guam in 1711 for the investigation, was not convinced of this explanation, especially since there was a state of war between Spain and England at the time. The bonds Pimentel gained were forfeited, and he was deprived of his position as governor. Torralba sent him to Manila in chains. The verdict was handed down on 23 January 1712, and the Real Audiencia approved the decision on 24 July 1714. He was also charged with the residencia of the officers of the galleon Nuestra Señora del Rosario y San Vicente Ferrer, which was shipwrecked in 1709 at San Bernardino Strait. However, since the treasure carried made it to land, the charges were dropped. On 4 February 1715, Governor Ursúa died in Manila. Torralba succeeded him as Governor-General of the Philippines.

== Administration of the Philippines ==
Moro raids continued during the Torralba administration, but the colonial government would take action after his term. In 1704, the Tournon affair stripped Torralba's predecessor as senior auditor, José Antonio Pavon, of his position. This sentence was reversed by royal decree on 15 April 1713. However, the decree arrived only during Torralba's administration. Due to various reasons, Torralba did not approve Pavon's reinstatement. Pavon sought refuge in an Augustinian convent. He had also forwarded proceedings against Gregorio Manuel de Villa (also an auditor), and two officers, namely Santos Perez Tagle and Luis Antonio de Tagle. Nevertheless, a royal decree on 18 August 1718 rendered Torralba's acts on these people null. With the arrival of the new governor, Fernando Manuel de Bustillo Bustamante y Rueda, they were reinstated to their respective positions. In addition, Pimentel was restored to his position of governor and was allowed to return to Marianas. Upon assuming office on 9 August 1717, Bustamante discovered financial mismanagement during the Torralba administration. The investigation was tasked to Andres Fernandez de Arquiju and Esteban Hizguiño. Within six months, the government was able to recover 293,444 pesos for the treasury, which includes the situado worth 74,482 pesos. Meanwhile, the investigation showed that there was a deficit of 700,000 pesos, with which Torralba was held responsible. Almost all members of the Audiencia were arrested, Torralba included, with the restored Villa as the only auditor remaining in service. By 1719, the shortage of auditors were evident. This led Governor Bustamante to consider releasing Torralba and reinstate him as auditor. However, Archbishop Francisco de la Cuesta contested this move, excommunicating Torralba for his acts against the Church during his administration. Meanwhile, Torralba sent warrants of arrest against his enemies, forcing them to seek sanctuary. As this happened, the Church called upon the people to march to the palace, leading to the death of Bustamante on 11 October 1719. With the governor's demise, Torralba was made to respond for his residencia. Thus, Torralba was investigated for his and Bustamante's administrations.

Despite the problems confronted by the Torralba administration, his residencia revealed that there was good progress being done in the two years he was governor. Various public works were undertaken, resulting to the repair of warehouses, hospitals, and churches. Intramuros was restored and new bronze cannons were installed in the walls. He also attempted to boost the morale of the colonial troops by focusing on military reforms and promotions. However, military officers viewed his attempt as encroachment of their authority. In 1716, Torralba's financial account submitted to King Philip V of Spain noted that there was actually a surplus of 294,000 pesos, with a net gain of 38,554 pesos. This is conflicting with the reported deficit of 700,000 pesos. Nevertheless, the residencia of Torralba caused his imprisonment and payment of fines as decided by the Council of the Indies. The original fine of 20,000 pesos was increased to 100,000 pesos, forcing him to poverty until his death in 1726.

Preceded by Martín de Ursúa	Governor General of the Philippines; 1715–1717	Succeeded by Fernando Manuel de Bustillo Bustamante y Rueda
