= Spanish conquest of Petén =

Final stage of the conquest of Guatemala

- Part of the Spanish conquest of Guatemala and the Spanish conquest of Yucatán
- Spanish entry routes to Petén during the 17th century, overlaid with the route that Hernán Cortés took in 1525
Date	c. 1618 – c. 1697
Location	Petén, Guatemala
Result	Spanish victory
Territorial changes	Incorporation of the Petén Basin into the Captaincy General of Guatemala

Belligerents
Spanish Empire	Independent Maya, including: Itza people; Kowoj people; Kejache people; Yalain people; Lakandon Chʼol people; Manche Chʼol people

Commanders and leaders
Martín de Ursúa	Kan Ekʼ

The Spanish conquest of Petén was the last stage of the conquest of Guatemala, a prolonged conflict during the Spanish colonisation of the Americas. A wide lowland plain covered with dense rainforest, Petén contains a central drainage basin with a series of lakes and areas of savannah. It is crossed by several ranges of low karstic hills and rises to the south as it nears the Guatemalan Highlands. The conquest of Petén, a region now incorporated into the modern republic of Guatemala, climaxed in 1697 with the capture of Nojpetén, the island capital of the Itza kingdom, by Martín de Ursúa y Arizmendi. With the defeat of the Itza, the last independent and unconquered native kingdom in the Americas fell to European colonisers.

Sizeable Maya populations existed in Petén before the conquest, particularly around the central lakes and along the rivers. Petén was divided into different Maya polities engaged in a complex web of alliances and enmities. The most important groups around the central lakes were the Itza, the Yalain and the Kowoj. Other groups with territories in Petén included the Kejache, the Acala, the Lakandon Chʼol, the Xocmo, the Chinamita, the Icaiche and the Manche Chʼol.

Petén was first penetrated by Hernán Cortés with a sizeable expedition that crossed the territory from north to south in 1525. In the first half of the 16th century, Spain established neighbouring colonies in Yucatán to the north and Guatemala to the south. Spanish missionaries laid the groundwork for the extension of colonial administration in the extreme south of Petén from 1596 onwards, but no further Spanish entry of central Petén took place until 1618 and 1619 when missionaries arrived at the Itza capital, having travelled from the Spanish town of Mérida in Yucatán.

In 1622 a military expedition set out from Yucatán led by Captain Francisco de Mirones and accompanied by Franciscan friar Diego Delgado; this expedition was a disaster, and the Spanish were massacred by the Itza. In 1628 the Manche Chʼol of the south were placed under the administration of the colonial governor of Verapaz within the Captaincy General of Guatemala. The Manche Chʼol unsuccessfully rebelled against Spanish control in 1633. In 1695 a military expedition tried to reach Lake Petén Itzá from Guatemala; this was followed in 1696 by missionaries from Mérida and in 1697 by Martín de Ursúa's expedition from Yucatán that resulted in the final defeat of the independent kingdoms of central Petén and their incorporation into the Spanish Empire.

== Geography ==
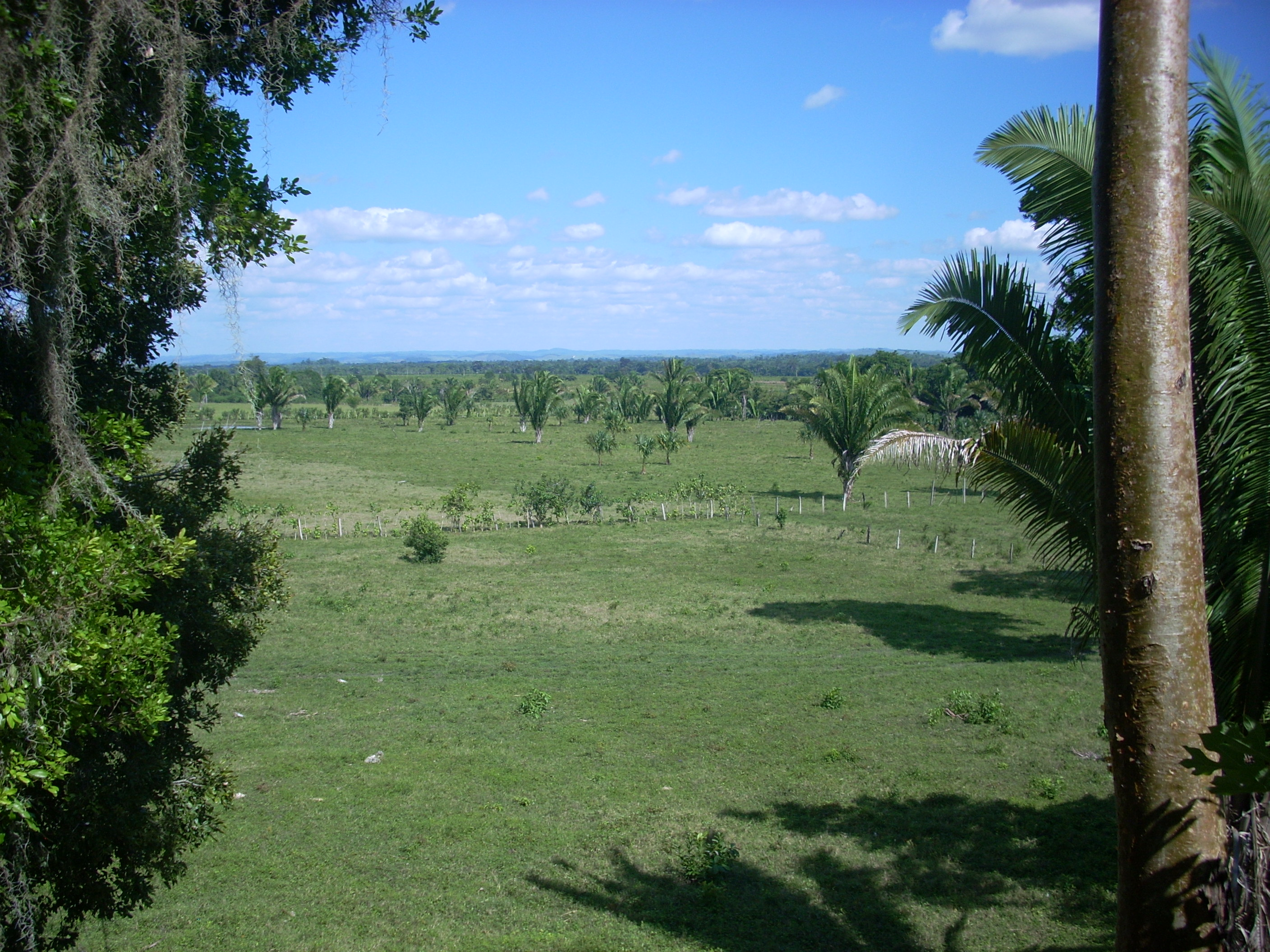
Petén savannah

The modern department of Petén is located in northern Guatemala. It is bordered on the west by the Mexican state of Chiapas; this border largely follows the course of the Usumacinta River. On the north side Petén is bordered by the Mexican state of Campeche and on the northwest by the Mexican state of Tabasco; Petén is bordered on the east by Belize and on the south side by the Guatemalan departments of Alta Verapaz and Izabal.

The Petén lowlands are formed by a densely forested low-lying limestone plain featuring karstic topography. The area is crossed by low east–west oriented ridges of Cenozoic limestone and is characterised by a variety of forest and soil types; water sources include generally small rivers and low-lying seasonal swamps known as bajos. A chain of fourteen lakes runs across the central drainage basin of Petén; during the rainy season some of these lakes become interconnected. This drainage area measures approximately 100 kilometres (62 mi) east–west by 30 kilometres (19 mi) north–south. The largest lake is Lake Petén Itzá, near the centre of the drainage basin; it measures 32 by 5 kilometres (19.9 by 3.1 mi). A broad savannah extends south of the central lakes; it has an average altitude of 150 metres (490 ft) above mean sea level with karstic ridges reaching an average altitude of 300 metres (980 ft). The savannah features a compact red clay soil that is too poor to support heavy cultivation, which resulted in a relatively low level of pre-Columbian occupation. It is surrounded by hills with unusually steep southern slopes and gentler northern approaches; the hills are covered with dense tropical forest. To the north of the lakes region bajos become more frequent, interspersed with forest. In the far north of Petén the Mirador Basin forms another interior drainage region. To the south Petén reaches an altitude of approximately 500 metres (1,600 ft) as it rises towards the Guatemalan Highlands and meets Paleozoic metamorphic rocks.

=== Climate ===
The climate of Petén is divided into wet and dry seasons, with the rainy season lasting from June to December, although these seasons are not clearly defined in the south. The climate varies from tropical in the south to semitropical in the north; temperature varies between 12 and 40 °C (54 and 104 °F), although it does not usually drop beneath 18 °C (64 °F). Mean temperature varies from 24.3 °C (75.7 °F) in the southeast around Poptún to 26.9 °C (80.4 °F) around Uaxactún in the northeast. Highest temperatures are reached from April to June, and January is the coldest month; all Petén experiences a hot dry period in late August. Annual precipitation is high, varying from a mean of 1,198 millimetres (47.2 in) in the northeast to 2,007 millimetres (79.0 in) in central Petén around Flores (Nojpetén). The extreme southeast of Petén experiences the largest variations in temperature and rainfall, with precipitation reaching as much as 3,000 millimetres (120 in) in a year.

== Petén before the conquest ==
The first large Maya cities developed in Petén as far back as the Middle Preclassic (c. 600–350 BC), and Petén formed the heartland of the ancient Maya civilization during the Classic period (c. AD 250–900). The great cities that dominated Petén had fallen into ruin by the beginning of the 10th century AD with the onset of the Classic Maya collapse. A significant Maya presence remained into the Postclassic period after the abandonment of the major Classic period cities; the population was particularly concentrated near permanent water sources.

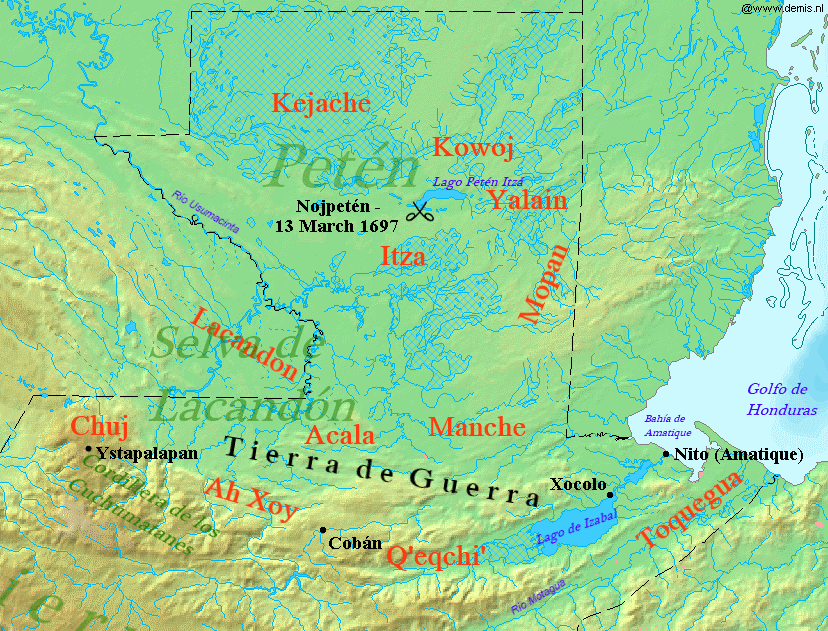
Map of the northern lowlands of Guatemala at the time of Spanish contact

Although there is insufficient data to accurately estimate population sizes at the time of contact with the Spanish, early Spanish reports suggest that sizeable Maya populations existed in Petén, particularly around the central lakes and along the rivers. Before their defeat in 1697 the Itza controlled or influenced much of Petén and parts of Belize. The Itza were warlike, and their martial prowess impressed both neighbouring Maya kingdoms and their Spanish enemies. Their capital was Nojpetén, an island city upon Lake Petén Itzá; it has developed into the modern town of Flores, which is the capital of the Petén department of Guatemala. The Itza spoke a variety of Yucatecan Maya.

The Kowoj were the second in importance, and they were hostile towards their Itza neighbours. The Kowoj were located to the east of the Itza, around the eastern lakes: Lake Salpetén, Lake Macanché, Lake Yaxhá and Lake Sacnab. Other groups are less well known, and their precise territorial extent and political makeup remains obscure; among them were the Chinamita, the Kejache, the Icaiche, the Lakandon Chʼol, the Mopan, the Manche Chʼol and the Yalain.

The Yalain appear to have been one of the three dominant polities in Postclassic central Petén, alongside the Itza and the Kowoj. The Yalain territory had its maximum extension from the east shore of Lake Petén Itzá eastwards to Tipuj in Belize. In the 17th century the Yalain capital was located at the site of that name on the north shore of Lake Macanché. At the time of Spanish contact the Yalain were allied with the Itza, an alliance cemented by intermarriage between the elites of both groups. In the late 17th century Spanish colonial records document hostilities between Maya groups in the lakes region, with the incursion of the Kowoj into former Yalain sites including Zacpeten on Lake Macanché and Ixlu on Lake Salpetén.

The Kejache occupied a territory to the north of the Itza, between the lakes and what is now Campeche. To the west of them was Acalan, inhabited by a Chontal Maya-speaking group with their capital in the south of what is now Campeche state. The Chʼolan Maya-speaking Lakandon (not to be confused with the modern inhabitants of Chiapas by that name) controlled territory along the tributaries of the Usumacinta River spanning southwestern Petén in Guatemala and eastern Chiapas. The Lakandon had a fierce reputation among the Spanish. The Xocmo were another Chʼolan-speaking group; they occupied the remote forest somewhere to the east of the Lakandon. Never conquered, the Xocmo escaped repeated Spanish attempts to locate them and their eventual fate is unknown; they may be ancestors of the modern Lacandon people. The Manche Chʼol held territory in the extreme south of what is now the Petén department. The Mopan and the Chinamita had their polities in the southeastern Petén. The Manche territory was to the southwest of the Mopan.

== Background to the conquest ==
Christopher Columbus discovered the Americas for the Kingdom of Castile and León in 1492. By 1580 this had unified with neighbouring kingdoms to form one Spanish kingdom. Private adventurers thereafter entered into contracts with the Spanish Crown to conquer the newly discovered lands in return for tax revenues and the power to rule. In the first decades after the discovery, the Spanish colonised the Caribbean and established a centre of operations on the island of Cuba. They heard rumours of the rich empire of the Aztecs on the mainland to the west and, in 1519, Hernán Cortés set sail with eleven ships to explore the Mexican coast. By August 1521 the Aztec capital of Tenochtitlan had fallen to the Spanish. Within three years of the fall of Tenochtitlan the Spanish had conquered a large part of Mexico, extending as far south as the Isthmus of Tehuantepec. The newly conquered territory became New Spain, headed by a viceroy who answered to the Spanish Crown via the Council of the Indies. Cortés despatched Pedro de Alvarado with an army to conquer the Mesoamerican kingdoms of the Guatemalan Sierra Madre and neighbouring Pacific plain; the military phase of the establishment of the Spanish colony of Guatemala lasted from 1524 to 1541. The Captaincy General of Guatemala had its capital at Santiago de los Caballeros de Guatemala and covered a wide territory that also included the Mexican state of Chiapas as well as El Salvador, Honduras and Costa Rica. The Spanish imposed colonial rule over Yucatán between 1527 and 1546, and over Verapaz from the 16th to the 17th centuries, leaving the area between – essentially Petén and much of Belize – independent long after surrounding peoples had been subjugated.

== Impact of Old World diseases ==
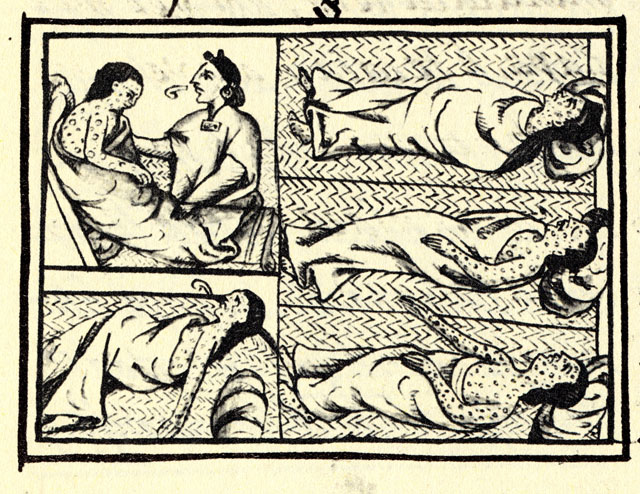
Illustration depicting smallpox victims in the 16th century Florentine Codex

A single soldier arriving in Mexico in 1520 was carrying smallpox and thus initiated the devastating plagues that swept through the native populations of the Americas. The European diseases that ravaged the indigenous inhabitants of the Americas also severely affected the various Maya groups of Petén. It is estimated that there were approximately 30,000 Chʼol and Chʼoltiʼ Maya in western Petén at the start of the 16th century. Between 1559 and 1721 they were devastated by a combination of disease, war and enforced relocations.

When Nojpetén fell in 1697 there were approximately 60,000 Maya living around Lake Petén Itzá, including a considerable number of refugees from other areas. It is estimated that 88% of the inhabitants died during the first decade of colonial rule because of disease and war. Although disease was responsible for the majority of deaths, internecine warfare between rival Maya groups and Spanish expeditions also took their toll.

== Weaponry and armour ==
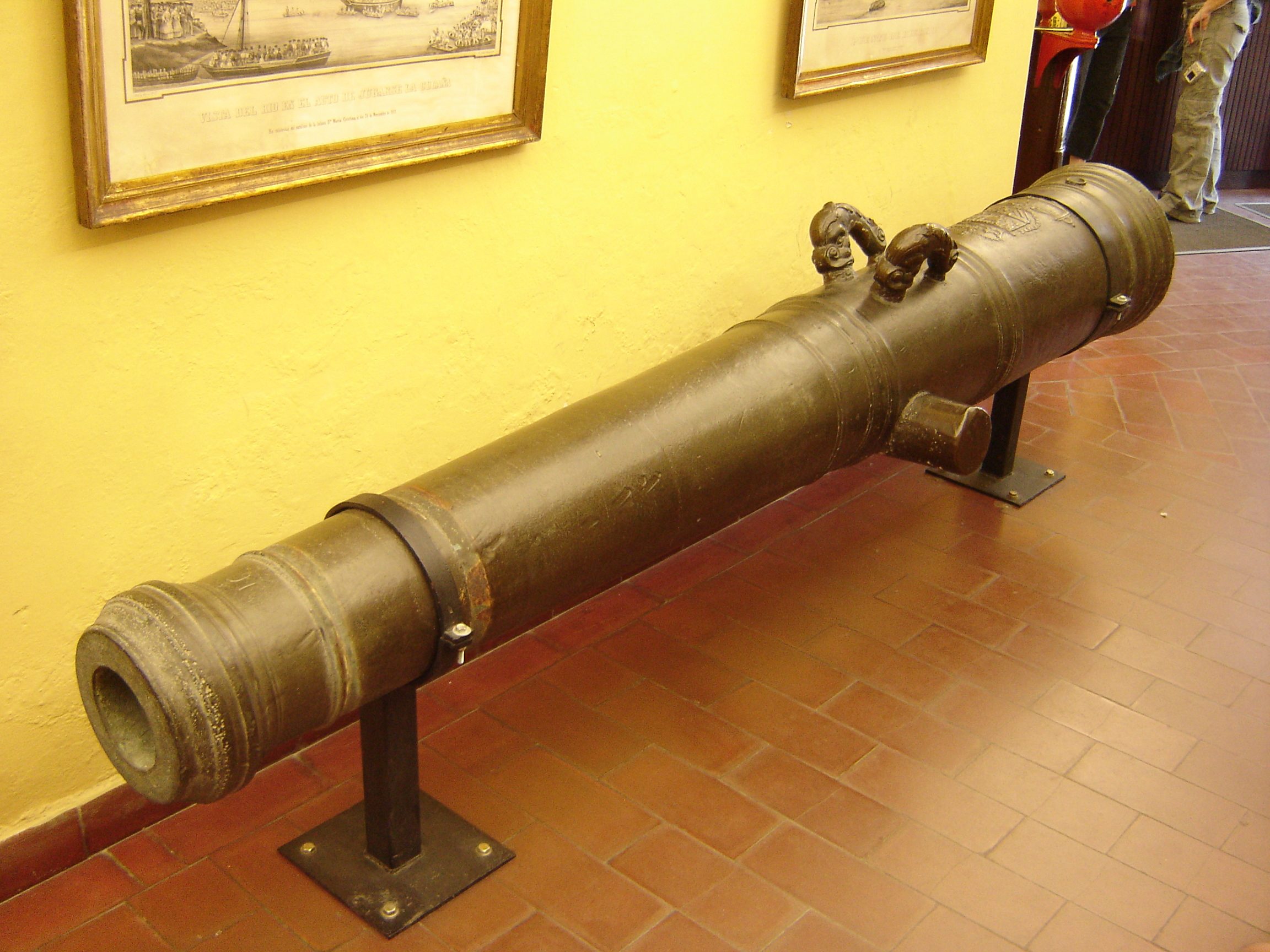
17th-century Spanish cannon

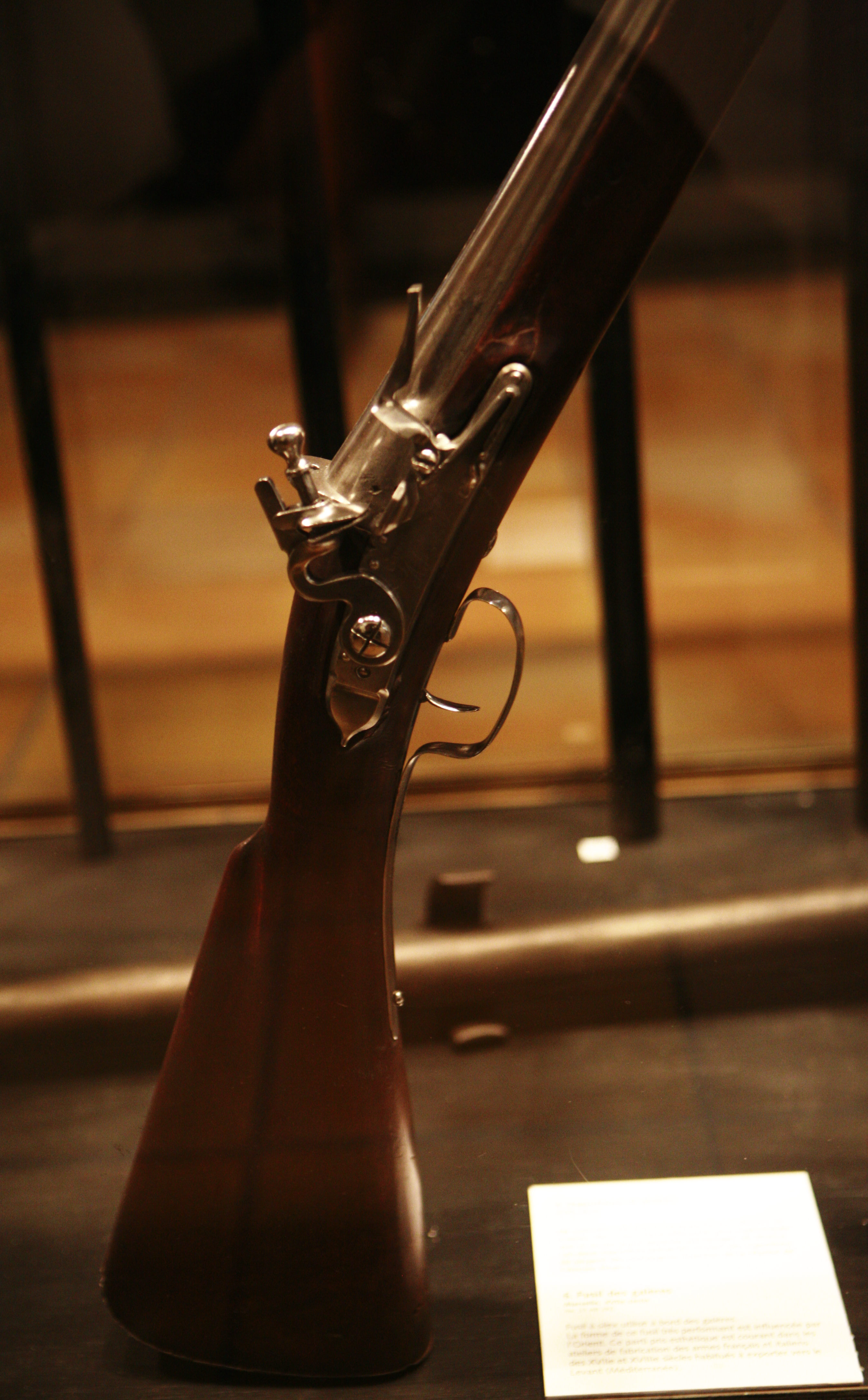
17th-century French musket

Conquistadors often wore steel armour that included chainmail and helmets. The Spanish were sufficiently impressed by the quilted cotton armour of their Maya enemies that they adopted it in preference to their own steel armour. Maya weaponry was not sufficiently powerful to justify the discomfort of wearing European armour. Quilted cotton armour, although still uncomfortably hot, was flexible and weighed much less. The Maya armour was adapted by the Spanish, who used knee-length quilted cotton tunics and Spanish-style caps. Horsemen wore long quilted cotton leg protectors; their horses were also protected with padded cotton armour. After the final push to the Petén lakes in early 1697, the Spanish recorded that they left with their garrison over 50 Dutch- and French-made muskets, three 1-pound (0.45 kg) calibre light cannons (piezas) cast from iron and mounted on carriages, four iron and two bronze pedreros (2-chambered stone-launchers) and six of at least eight bronze light cannons (known as esmiriles).

=== Native weaponry ===
... The two [Itza] Captains bore their Lances with points of Flint, like ours, which differ from them only in being of Steel, and at the heads of them are many Plumes of divers and beautiful colors like the Ribbons our Standard-bearers use on their darts; and the points are as much as a quarter of a vara long and have two cutting-edges, and the point is like a very sharp Dagger. The other Itzaex Indians bore their Bows and Arrows with which they always march when they come forth from their Island ... in case they meet the Chinamitas, a Nation for whom they have always had enmity, and continual wars; for they hold themselves as brave warriors like the Itzas themselves.

— Juan de Villagutierre Soto-Mayor, 1701
Book II, Chapter II, p. 92.

The Spanish described the weapons of war of the Petén Maya as bows and arrows, fire-sharpened poles, flint-headed spears and two-handed swords known as hadzab that were crafted from strong wood with the blade fashioned from inset obsidian; these were similar to the Aztec macuahuitl. They had a thin, wide wooden shaft with obsidian or flint blades set into channels in the wood. The shaft was up to 80 centimetres (31 in) long and was crafted from the hard, dark wood of a flowering tree (Apoplanesia paniculata) called chulul by the Maya. The bows used by the Maya were described as almost as high as a man and were made from the same chulul wood as the hadzab, with the bowstring fashioned from henequen fibre; the bow was called a chuhul. Arrows were made from reeds with flint, bone or fishtooth arrowheads and flights crafted from feathers. In hand-to-hand combat the Maya used daggers with obsidian or flint blades set into a chulul-wood handle, they were about 20 centimetres (7.9 in) long. Maya spears were referred to as nabte; sometimes the tip was fire-hardened, sometimes they were set with a stone blade. Spears were mainly used to thrust and slash but they could also be thrown as a javelin. The Maya used several different sizes of spear with the smaller spears probably employed as a missile; the longer spears were a similar size as those used by the Spanish.

Distinguished Maya warriors entered battle wearing armour. The upper body was covered by a short jacket that was filled with rock salt, and the forearms and legs were protected with tight bindings of cloth or leather. The salt-packed cotton armour was tough enough that even arrows could not penetrate it. Armour could be decorated and was often adorned with feathers. Commoners did not wear armour in battle, usually only wearing a loincloth and warpaint. Warriors carried shields made from two right-angled wooden bars with deerskin stretched across them.

== Strategies and tactics ==
The Spanish were aware that the Itza Maya had become the centre of anti-Spanish resistance and engaged in a policy of encircling their kingdom and cutting their trade routes over the course of almost two hundred years. The Itza resisted this steady encroachment by recruiting their neighbours as allies against the Spanish advance. The Spanish engaged in a strategy of concentrating native populations in newly founded colonial towns, or reducciones (also known as congregaciones). Native resistance to the new nucleated settlements took the form of the flight of the indigenous inhabitants into inaccessible regions such as the forest or joining neighbouring Maya groups that had not yet submitted to the Spanish. Those that remained behind in the reducciones often fell victim to contagious diseases.

In addition to military expeditions, a contract for conquest was issued to the Dominican Order, which engaged missionaries for the peaceful pacification of native populations so they would accept Roman Catholicism and submit to Spanish rule. This tactic worked in the neighbouring mountains of Verapaz to the south, although their success there was aided by the threat of Spanish garrisons stationed within striking distance. In the lowland Petén this approach was not so successful, since the Maya could disappear easily into the rainforest leaving the Spanish with deserted settlements. Likewise, the Franciscan Order engaged in generally peaceful attempts to incorporate the Maya into the Spanish Empire via the attempted Christian conversion of native leaders. The Franciscan Order routinely embraced the practice of missionary violence, including corporal punishment and the defence of the idea of "holy war" against non-Christians. In many cases the Maya remained Christian only while the missionaries were present, and they would immediately become apostate as soon as the friars left. In Guatemala in the late 17th century, the Franciscan friar Francisco de Asís Vázquez de Herrera argued that war against apostate Indians was obligatory. Missionary penetration of Petén was not risk-free, and many missionaries were killed in the region.

Independent Maya frequently attacked Christianised Maya settlements and encouraged such settlements to abandon their new religion and resist the Spanish. As Spanish military expeditions were launched against the Maya with increasing frequency, independent Maya communities began to request the presence of missionaries to avoid armed conflict. The Itza attempted to use neighbouring Maya groups, such as the Yalain, as a buffer against Spanish encroachment; they may also have instigated rebellions by neighbouring groups that were already undergoing incorporation into the Spanish Empire. With Spanish attempts to penetrate the region divided between mutually independent colonial authorities in Yucatán and Guatemala, at times the Itza would be making peaceful overtures on one front while fighting on the other.

== Cortés in Petén ==
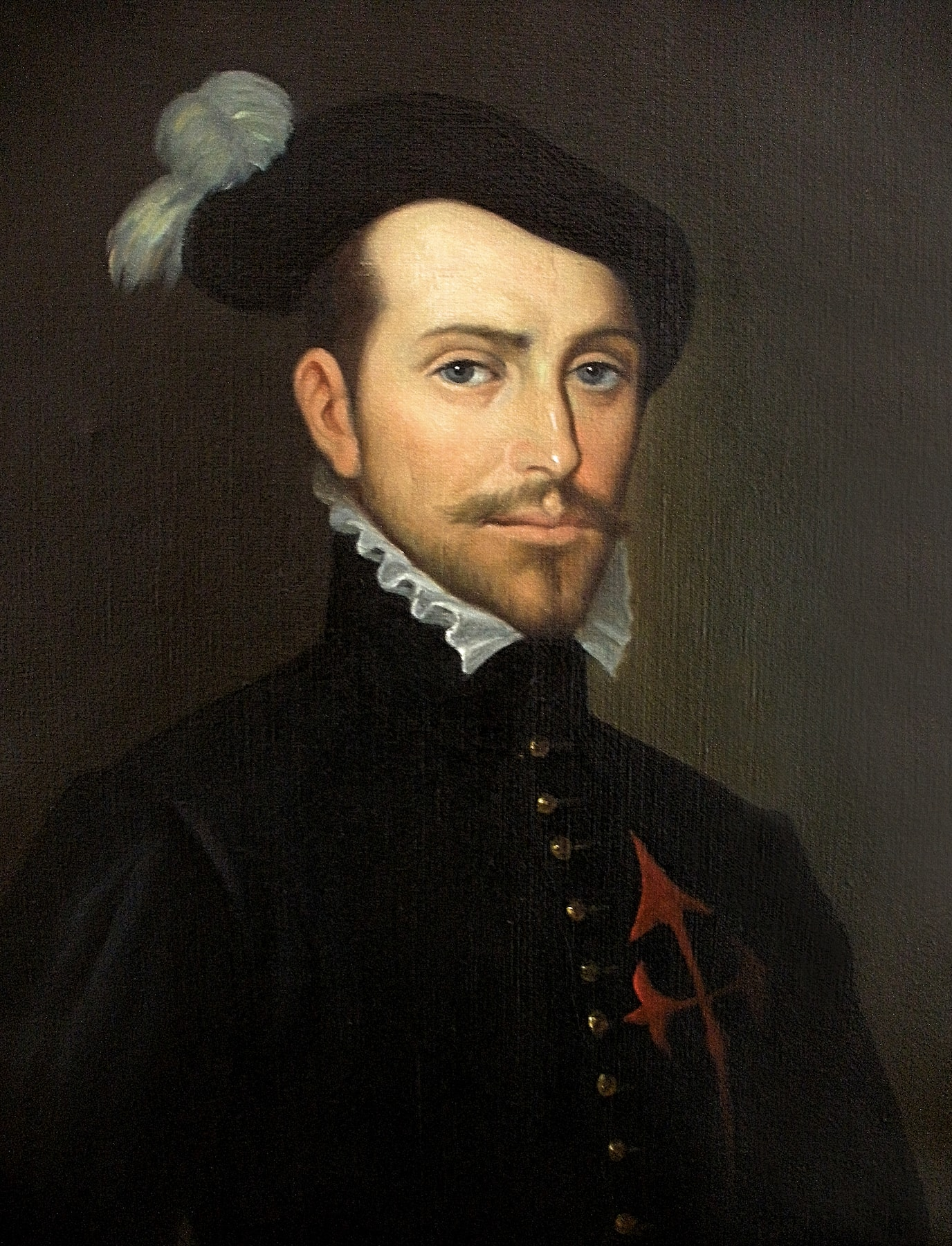
Hernán Cortés, conqueror of the Aztecs, travelled across Petén in the early 16th century.

In 1525, after the Spanish conquest of the Aztec Empire, Hernán Cortés led an expedition to Honduras over land, cutting across the Itza kingdom in what is now the northern Petén Department of Guatemala. His aim was to subdue the rebellious Cristóbal de Olid, whom he had sent to conquer Honduras; Olid had set himself up independently on his arrival in that territory. Cortés had 140 Spanish soldiers, 93 of them mounted, 3,000 Mexican warriors, 150 horses, a herd of pigs, artillery, munitions and other supplies. He also had with him 600 Chontal Maya carriers from Acalan. They arrived at the north shore of Lake Petén Itzá on 13 March 1525.

The Roman Catholic priests accompanying the expedition celebrated mass in the presence of Aj Kan Ekʼ, the king of the Itza, who was said to be so impressed that he pledged to worship the cross and to destroy his idols. Cortés accepted an invitation from Kan Ekʼ to visit Nojpetén (also known as Tayasal), and crossed to the Maya city with 20 Spanish soldiers while the rest of his army continued around the lake to meet him on the south shore. On his departure from Nojpetén, Cortés left behind a cross and a lame horse that the Itza treated as a deity, attempting to feed it poultry, meat and flowers, but the animal soon died. The Spanish did not officially contact the Itza again until the arrival of Franciscan priests in 1618, when Cortés' cross was said to still be standing at Nojpetén.

From the lake, Cortés continued south along the western slopes of the Maya Mountains, a particularly arduous journey that took 12 days to cover 32 kilometres (20 mi), during which he lost more than two-thirds of his horses. When he came to a river swollen with the constant torrential rains that had been falling during the expedition, Cortés turned upstream to the Gracias a Dios rapids, which took two days to cross and cost him more horses.

On 15 April 1525 the expedition arrived at the Maya village of Tenciz. With local guides they headed into the hills north of Lake Izabal, where their guides abandoned them to their fate. The expedition became lost in the hills and came close to starvation before they captured a Maya boy who led them to safety. Cortés found a village on the shore of Lake Izabal, perhaps Xocolo. He crossed the Dulce River to the settlement of Nito, somewhere on the Amatique Bay, with about a dozen companions, and waited there for the rest of his army to regroup over the next week. By this time the remnants of the expedition had been reduced to a few hundred; Cortés succeeded in contacting the Spaniards he was searching for, only to find that Olid had already been deposed, trialed and beheaded for treason by his trusty lieutenant de las Casas. Cortés then returned to Mexico by sea.

== Prelude to conquest ==
From 1527 onwards the Spanish were increasingly active in the Yucatán Peninsula, establishing several colonies and towns by 1544, including Campeche and Valladolid in what is now Mexico. The Spanish impact on the northern Maya, encompassing invasion, epidemic diseases and the export of up to 50,000 Maya slaves, caused many Maya to flee southwards to join the Itza around Lake Petén Itzá, within the modern borders of Guatemala.

Dominican missionaries were active in Verapaz and the southern Petén from the late 16th century through the 17th century, attempting non-violent conversion with limited success. In the 17th century, the Franciscans came to the conclusion that the pacification and Christian conversion of the Maya would not be possible as long as the Itza held out at Lake Petén Itzá. The constant flow of escapees fleeing the Spanish-held territories to find refuge with the Itza was a drain on the workforce managed by the encomienda system.

=== Missions in southern Petén ===
The first Catholic missionaries entered southern Petén in 1596 to convert the Manche Chʼol and the Mopan. The Qʼeqchiʼ of Verapaz long had close ties with the Manche Chʼol. The colonial Maya towns of Cobán and Cahabón, in Alta Verapaz, traded quetzal feathers, copal, chile, cotton, salt and Spanish-produced iron tools with their lowland Lakandon and Manche Chʼol neighbours, receiving cacao and achiote in exchange. Many Qʼeqchiʼ from Verapaz fled Spanish control to settle among the Lakandón and Manche Chʼol. These fugitives strengthened the existing ties between the independent Chʼol and the Spanish-controlled Maya of Verapaz; the constant flow of Maya between colonial Verapaz and independent Petén led to religious syncretism that the Spanish religious authorities were unable to prevent. This relationship did not hinder the Spanish from using the Qʼeqchiʼ to help conquer and reduce the Manche Chʼol.

From the middle of the 16th century the Dominican Order had been tasked with the peaceful conversion of the Chʼol of Verapaz and southern Petén, and their concentration into new colonial towns. The Itza became fearful that the newly converted Manche Chʼol would lead the Spanish to Nojpetén. In 1628 the towns of the Manche Chʼol were placed under the administration of the governor of Verapaz, with Dominican friar Francisco Morán as their ecclesiastical head. Morán favoured a more robust approach to the conversion of the Manche and moved Spanish soldiers into the region to protect against raids from the Itza to the north. The new Spanish garrison in an area that had not previously seen a heavy Spanish military presence provoked the Manche to revolt, which was followed by abandonment of the indigenous settlements. The Itza, worried about the southern approaches to their territory, may have instigated a Manche rebellion that took place in Lent 1633.

Towards the end of the 17th century Spanish priorities changed, and the failure of the peaceful efforts of the Dominicans to convert the Chʼol combined with the increasing British presence in the Caribbean led the colonial authorities to end the Dominican monopoly and allow the Franciscans and other orders to enter the region; military options were also viewed more favourably. Between 1685 and 1689, the Qʼeqchiʼ of Cobán and Cahabón were forced to assist the Spanish in their armed expeditions against the Manche Chʼol and in forcibly relocating them to Verapaz. These actions depopulated the southern Petén and led to the breakdown of the trade routes linking colonial Guatemala with the independent Maya of Petén. From 1692 to 1694, Franciscan friars Antonio Margil and Melchor López were active among the Manche and Lakandon Chʼol. They were eventually expelled by the Chʼol; upon their return to Santiago de Guatemala they proposed three invasion routes into southern Petén and neighbouring Chiapas. Throughout the 17th century, Spanish missionaries encountered considerable reticence among the Manche, until the Spanish finally decided to move them to an area where they could be more easily controlled. At the time of contact there were perhaps 10,000 Manche; these were devastated by war and disease, with the survivors relocated to Rabinal in the modern department of Baja Verapaz. After 1700 the Manche Chʼol ceased to play any part in the history of Petén.

The Mopan population has been estimated at between 10,000 and 20,000 people at the time of contact. In 1692 the Council of the Indies ordered that the Manche Chʼol and the Mopan be dealt with decisively. The population suffered the effects of war and disease, and the few survivors were moved into Spanish reducciones in southeastern Petén, before being moved to colonial settlements in other parts of Petén. In 1695 the colonial authorities decided to act upon a plan to connect the province of Guatemala with Yucatán, and soldiers commanded by Jacinto de Barrios Leal, president of the Royal Audiencia of Guatemala, conquered several Chʼol communities. The most important of these was Sakbʼajlan on the Lacantún River in eastern Chiapas, now in Mexico, which was renamed as Nuestra Señora de Dolores, or Dolores del Lakandon, in April 1695. This was one part of a three-pronged attack against the independent inhabitants of Petén and neighbouring Chiapas; a second group joined up with Barrios Leal having marched from Huehuetenango. The third group, under Juan Díaz de Velasco, marched from Verapaz against the Itza. Barrios Leal was accompanied by Franciscan friar Antonio Margil who served as an advisor as well as his personal confessor and chaplain to his troops. The Spanish built a fort and garrisoned it with 30 Spanish soldiers. Mercederian friar Diego de Rivas was based at Dolores del Lakandon, and he and his fellow Mercederians baptised several hundred Lakandon Chʼols in the following months and established contacts with neighbouring Chʼol communities.

Resistance against the Spanish continued, and hostile Chʼol killed several newly baptised Christian Indians. In early March 1696 such was the success of the friars that captain Jacobo de Alzayaga and the Mercederians decided to try to reach Lake Petén Itzá. They headed eastwards towards the Pasión River with 150 heavily armed soldiers plus native guides, travelling in five large canoes. They got as far as the savannah to the southeast of the lake before turning back for unknown reasons. Antonio Margil remained in Dolores del Lakandon until 1697. The Chʼol of the Lacandon Jungle were resettled in Huehuetenango in the early 18th century.

== Conquest of the central lakes ==
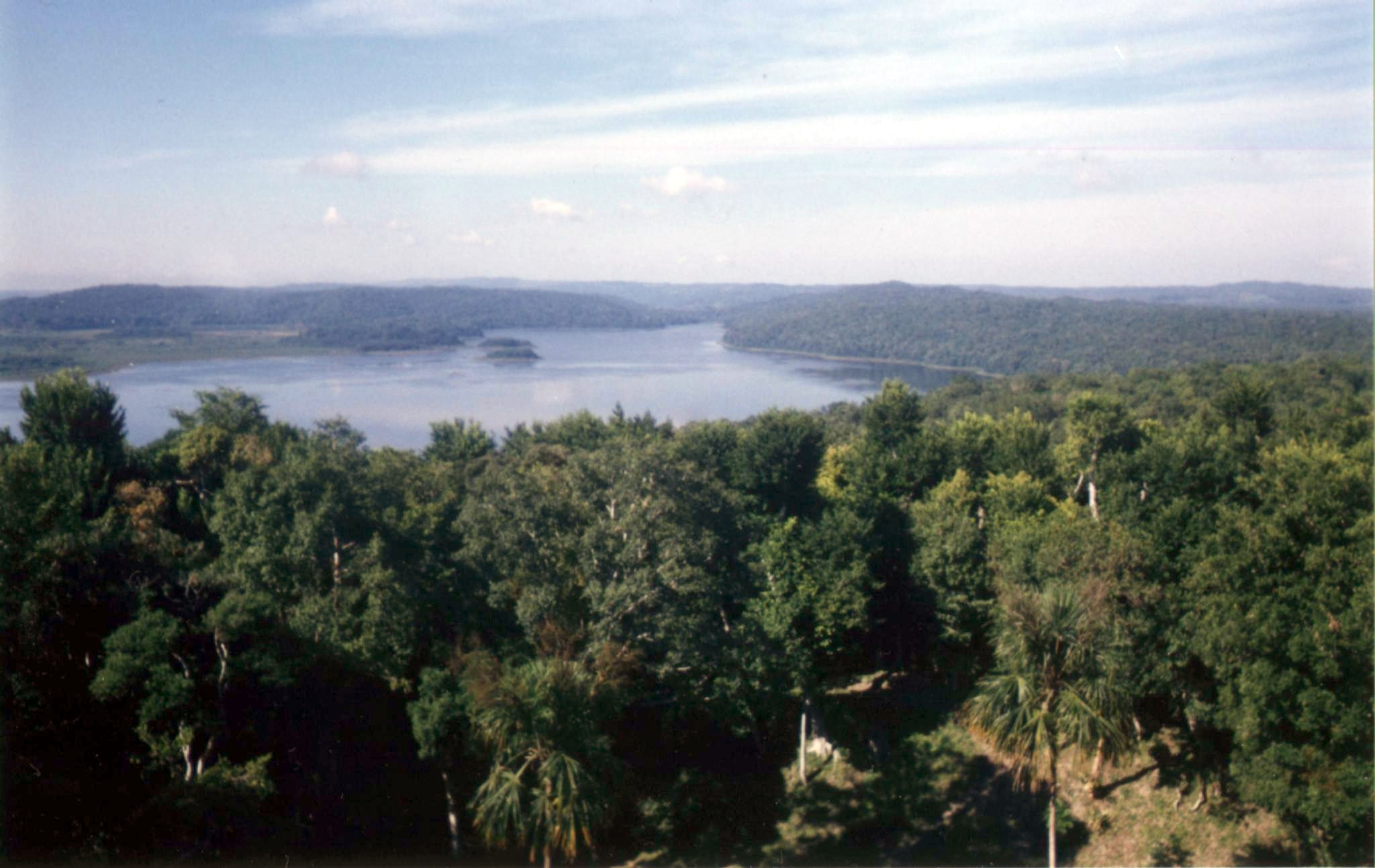
Lake Yaxha is surrounded by dense forest.

Nojpetén fell to a Spanish assault on 13 March 1697, more than 150 years after the conquest of the rest of the Yucatán Peninsula and more than 160 years after the conquest of the Guatemalan Highlands. The lengthy delay in conquering the Petén region was due to a combination of its geographical remoteness and inhospitality and the fierce reputation of its Maya inhabitants. During this time the Itza used the Yalain as an eastern buffer against Spanish approach from Belize. The lengthy indirect contact between the Itza and the Spanish invaders allowed the Itza to develop an understanding of Spanish strategy and tactics that was honed over the period of almost two centuries that the Itza were surrounded by European-dominated territories. This understanding distinguished the conquest of Petén from the 16th-century conquests of the Aztecs, Maya and Incas. In contrast, the Spanish had a very poor understanding of the Itza and their neighbours and viewed them as ignorant savages whose kingdom was protected by Satan from the Christianising efforts of the Spanish Empire and the Roman Catholic Church. From the time that Hernán Cortés crossed Petén in the early 16th century, the Spanish mistakenly believed the king of the Itza (the Aj Kan Ek') was the overlord of the entire central Petén region.

=== Early 17th century ===
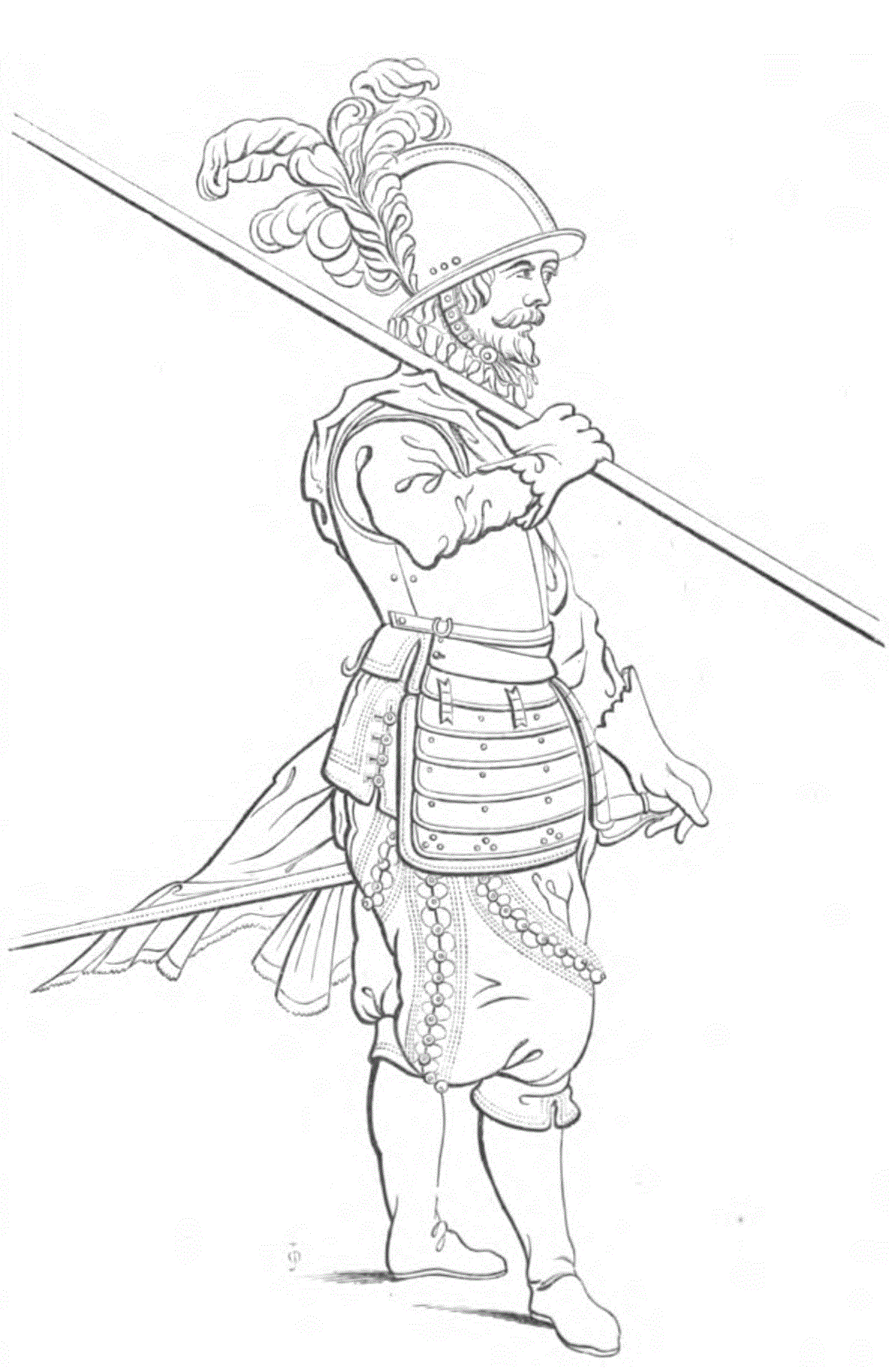
17th-century European pikeman

Following Cortés' visit, no Spanish attempted to visit the warlike Itza inhabitants of Nojpetén for almost a hundred years. In 1618 two Franciscan friars set out from Mérida in Yucatán on a mission to attempt the peaceful conversion of the still pagan Itza in central Petén. Bartolomé de Fuensalida and Juan de Orbita were accompanied by some Christianised Maya. Andrés Carrillo de Pernía, a Criollo who was the alcalde of Bacalar (a colonial official), (Note: Two Spanish colonial settlements in Quintana Roo bore the name Bacalar. The principal town of that name was Salamanca de Bacalar, often shortened to just Bacalar, near Chetumal on the Caribbean coast. Bacalar-at-Chunjujubʼ was a smaller settlement on the road to Mérida, modern Chunhuhub. In this article, unless stated otherwise, all references to Bacalar refer to Salamanca de Bacalar.) joined the party at Bacalar and escorted them upriver as far as Tipuj, returning to Bacalar once he was certain of the friars receiving a good welcome there. After an arduous six-month journey the travellers were well received by the current Kan Ekʼ. They stayed at Nojpetén for some days in an attempt to evangelise the Itza, but the Aj Kan Ekʼ refused to renounce his Maya religion, although he showed interest in the masses held by the Catholic missionaries. Kan Ekʼ informed them that according to ancient Itza prophecy it was not yet time for them to convert. In the time since Cortés had visited Nojpetén, the Itza had made a statue of the deified horse. Juan de Orbita was outraged when he saw the idol and he immediately smashed it into pieces. Fuensalida was able to save the lives of the visitors from the infuriated natives by means of a particularly eloquent sermon that resulted in them being forgiven. Attempts to convert the Itza failed, and the friars left Nojpetén on friendly terms with Kan Ekʼ.

The friars returned in 1619, arriving in October and staying for eighteen days. Again Kan Ekʼ welcomed them in a friendly manner, but this time the Maya priesthood were hostile and jealous of the missionaries' influence upon the king. They persuaded Kan Ek's wife to convince him to expel the unwelcome visitors. The missionaries' lodgings were surrounded by armed warriors, and the friars and their accompanying servants were escorted to a waiting canoe and instructed to leave and never return. Juan de Orbita attempted to resist and was rendered unconscious by an Itza warrior. The missionaries were expelled without food or water but survived the journey back to Mérida.

Before the early 17th century, the western Petén had been heavily populated by Chʼol and Chʼoltiʼ Maya and was an important trade route for the Itza. By the mid-17th century, these populations had been devastated by war, disease and the enforced movement of the inhabitants into colonial settlements, negating the economic importance of the region for the Itza. At the same time the Kejache were becoming important intermediaries between the Itza and Yucatán. The Putun Acalan subgroup of the Kejache had previously traded directly with the Itza but had been relocated by the Spanish. The remaining Kejache, devastated by disease and subject to the intense attentions of Spanish missionaries, were no longer able to supply the Itza directly and became middlemen instead.

==== Spanish setbacks in the 1620s ====
In March 1622, governor of Yucatán Diego de Cardenas ordered captain Francisco de Mirones Lezcano to launch an assault upon the Itza; he set out from Yucatán with 20 Spanish soldiers and 80 Mayas from Yucatán. His expedition was later joined by Franciscan friar Diego Delgado. The expedition first camped at IxPimienta; (Note: IxPimienta was a village west of Bacalar, on a single-file path from Yucatán to Petén, at a junction with another path leading to Tipuj. By 1561 it was inhabited by Maya that had fled from already-conquered neighbouring regions and in 1622 most of the inhabitants were originally from Spanish-dominated north-western Yucatan.) in May they moved to Sakalum, southwest of Bacalar, where there was a lengthy delay while they waited for reinforcements. En route to Nojpetén, Delgado believed that the soldiers' treatment of the Maya was excessively cruel, and he left the expedition to make his own way to Nojpetén with eighty Christianised Maya from Tipuj in Belize. In the meantime the Itza had learnt of the approaching military expedition and had become hardened against further Spanish missionary attempts. When Mirones learnt of Delgado's departure, he sent 13 soldiers to persuade him to return or continue as his escort should he refuse. The soldiers caught up with him just before Tipuj, but he was determined to reach Nojpetén. From Tipuj, Delgado sent a messenger to Kan Ekʼ, asking permission to travel to Nojpetén; the Itza king replied with a promise of safe passage for the missionary and his companions. The party was initially received in peace at the Itza capital, but as soon as the Spanish soldiers let their guard down, the Itza seized and bound the new arrivals. The soldiers were sacrificed to the Maya gods, with their hearts cut from their chests and their heads impaled on stakes around the town. After the sacrifice of the Spanish soldiers, the Itza took Delgado, cut his heart out and dismembered him; they displayed his head on a stake with the others. The fate of the leader of Delgado's Maya companions was no better. With no word from Delgado's escort, Mirones sent two Spanish soldiers with Bernardino Ek, a Maya scout, to learn their fate. When they arrived upon the shore of Lake Petén Itzá, the Itza took them across to their island capital and imprisoned them. They escaped to a canoe by the lakeshore but the two Spanish, slowed by their bonds, were soon recaptured. Ek escaped and returned to Mirones with the news.

Soon afterwards, on 27 January 1624, an Itza war party led by AjKʼin Pʼol caught Mirones and his soldiers off guard and unarmed in the church at Sakalum and slaughtered them. Spanish reinforcements led by Juan Bernardo Casanova arrived too late; the Spanish soldiers had been sacrificed, hanged and beheaded, with their corpses burned and impaled on stakes at the entrance to the village; Mirones and the Franciscan priest had been bound to the church posts and then sacrificed with their hearts cut out. A number of local Maya men and women had also been hanged but not decapitated, and the attackers had burned the town.

Following these massacres, Spanish garrisons were stationed in several towns in southern Yucatán, and rewards were offered for the whereabouts of AjKʼin Pʼol. The Maya governor of Oxkutzcab, Fernando Kamal, set out with 150 Maya archers to track the warleader down; they succeeded in capturing the Itza captain and his followers, together with silverware from the looted Sakalum church and items belonging to Mirones. The prisoners were taken back to the Spanish captain Antonio Méndez de Canzo, interrogated under torture, tried, and condemned to be hanged, drawn and quartered. They were decapitated, and the heads were displayed in the plazas of towns throughout the colonial Partido de la Sierra in what is now Mexico's Yucatán state. These events ended all Spanish attempts to contact the Itza until 1695. In the 1640s internal strife in Spain distracted the government from attempts to conquer unknown lands; the Spanish Crown lacked the time, money or interest in such colonial adventures for the next four decades.

=== Late 17th century ===
What matters it that the time has come when we are to become Christians, if this slender point of my flint lance has not been worn out?

— Words of Aj Kowoj to Andrés de Avendaño

In 1692 Basque nobleman Martín de Ursúa y Arizmendi proposed to the Spanish king the construction of a road from Mérida southwards to link with the Guatemalan colony, in the process "reducing" any independent native populations into colonial congregaciones; this was part of a greater plan to subjugate the Lakandon and Manche Chʼol of southern Petén and the upper reaches of the Usumacinta River. The original plan was for the province of Yucatán to build the northern section and for Guatemala to build the southern portion, with both meeting somewhere in Chʼol territory; the plan was later modified to pass further east, through the kingdom of the Itza.

==== Spanish–Itza diplomatic contacts, 1695 ====
In December 1695 the Spanish colonial authorities in Mérida received a diplomatic visit sent by the Aj Kan Ekʼ. The diplomatic contact had been negotiated by Spanish captain Francisco Hariza y Arruyo, alcalde of Bacalar-at-Chunjujubʼ. Hariza had sent a Christian Maya ambassador to Nojpetén from Tipuj in April 1695, who arrived around the same time that the Itza were preparing to defend themselves against a Spanish party entering from Guatemala; nonetheless the emissary was received in peace and despatched back to Hariza with promises of submission to Spain. In August Hariza travelled to Mérida in the company of a group of seven Tipuj natives offering submission to Spain. Four members of this party were not from Tipuj at all, but were Itza diplomats sent incognito from Yalain to discuss possible peaceful contacts with the colonial authorities. The leader of the Itza delegation was AjChan, a nephew of the Itza king. When friar Avendaño was in Mérida in September 1695 between attempts to reach Nojpetén, he met with the Itza–Yalain delegation and was able to give an account of them when he travelled through Yalain after visiting Nojpetén in January 1696. AjChan and his companions returned to Nojpetén in November but did not stay long before leaving for Mérida again.

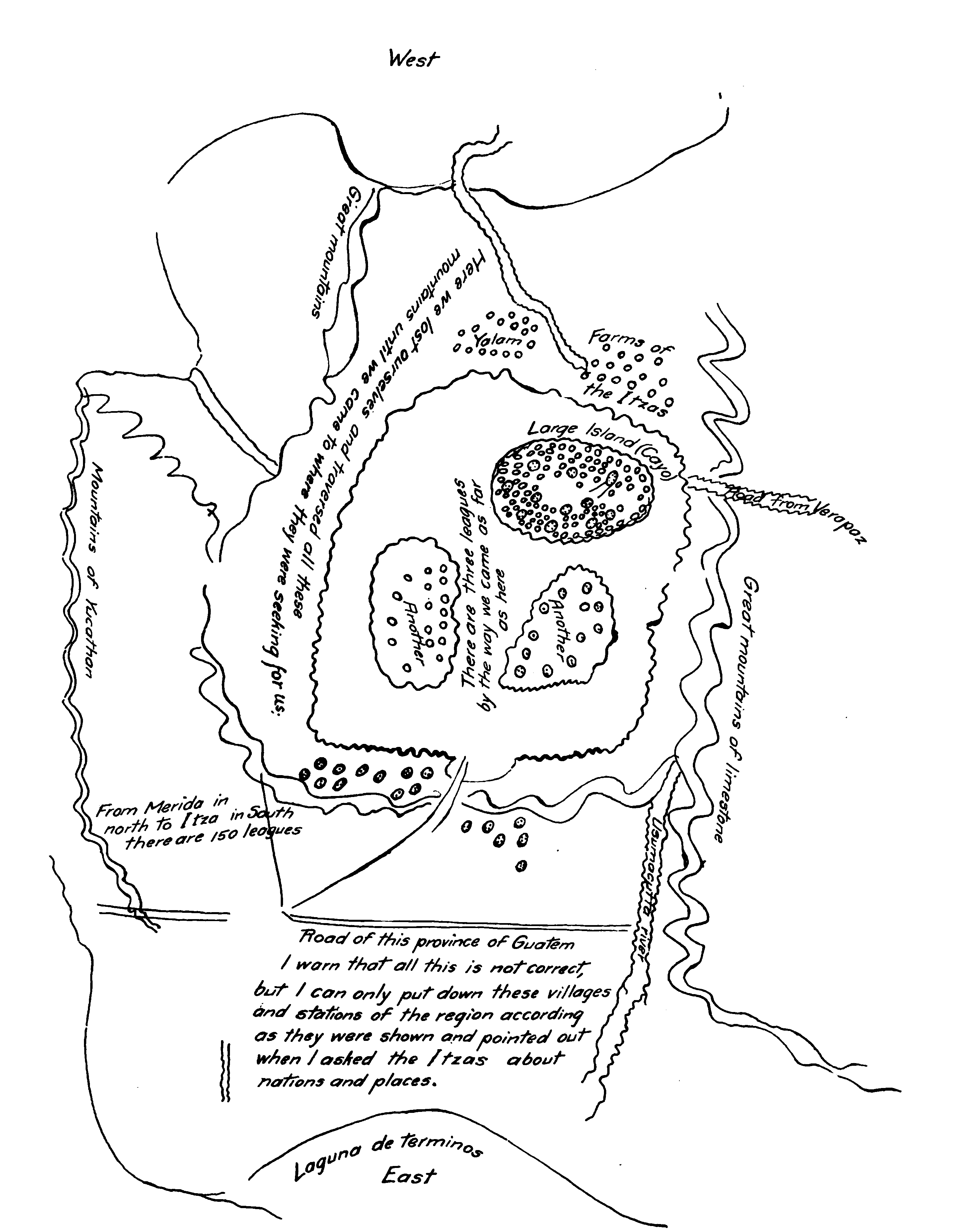
English-language reproduction of Avendaño's 1696 map of Lake Petén Itzá

In December, Kan Ekʼ despatched AjChan to negotiate peace with Spain, with three Itza companions. They were accompanied to Mérida by a small number of Mopans from the Tipuj region. AjChan, through family ties and marriage, had a key role as a middleman between the Itza, Yalain and Kowoj; he also had family ties with the semi-Christianised Maya at Tipuj, and his mother was from Chichen Itza in the northern Yucatán. His marriage to a Kowoj woman had been an attempt, ultimately unsuccessful, to defuse Itza–Kowoj hostility. Kan Ekʼ sent AjChan to Mérida with a message of peaceful submission to the Spanish Empire in an attempt to solidify his own position as sole ruler of the Itza, even if this meant sacrificing Itza independence from Spain. The Itza king's uncle and the Kowoj were fundamentally opposed to any negotiations with the Spanish and viewed AjChan's embassy as treachery. The Spanish were unaware of the tensions between different Maya factions in central Petén, which by now had escalated into a state of inter-Maya warfare. AjChan was baptised as Martín Francisco on 31 December 1695, with Martín de Ursúa, governor of Yucatán, acting as his godfather.

The arrival of AjChan and his subsequent baptism was an important diplomatic coup for Ursúa, who used the visit for his own political advancement, promoting the embassy as the peaceful final submission of the Itza kingdom to the Spanish Crown. This formal submission of the Itza kingdom to Spain was a critical turning point, since from a Spanish legal viewpoint the Itza were now subjects and the royal prohibition on military conquest could be sidestepped. AjChan left Mérida with his companions and a Spanish escort in the middle of January 1696 and arrived back at Tipuj around the end of the month. After a few days at Tipuj he learnt of violent events unfolding around Lake Petén Itzá including the battle at Chʼichʼ and the subsequent killing of two Franciscans. Fearing the response of his Spanish escort, he abandoned them and fled back to Yalain.

==== García de Paredes' entry from Yucatán, March–April 1695 ====
The governor of Yucatán, Martín de Ursúa y Arizmendi, began to build the road from Campeche south towards Petén. At the beginning of March 1695, Ursúa ordered captain Alonso García de Paredes to explore this road; García led a group of 50 Spanish soldiers, accompanied by native guides, muleteers and labourers. García had previous experience from military expeditions around Sajkabʼchen (near modern Xcabacab in southern Campeche state) The expedition advanced some way south of Sajkabʼchen into Kejache territory, which began at Chunpich, about 5 kilometres (3.1 mi) north of the modern border between Mexico and Guatemala. He rounded up some natives to be moved into colonial settlements, but met with armed Kejache resistance. A skirmish ensued at a Kejache village, resulting in the deaths of eight Kejache warriors. Prisoners taken during the skirmish informed García that many independent Maya lived in the area, both Kejache and others. García decided to retreat around the middle of April, probably to escort captured Kejache back to Sajkabʼchen to be put to work on García's encomienda. Captain García reported back to Ursúa on 21 April 1695.

==== Díaz de Velasco and Cano's entry from Verapaz, March–April 1695 ====
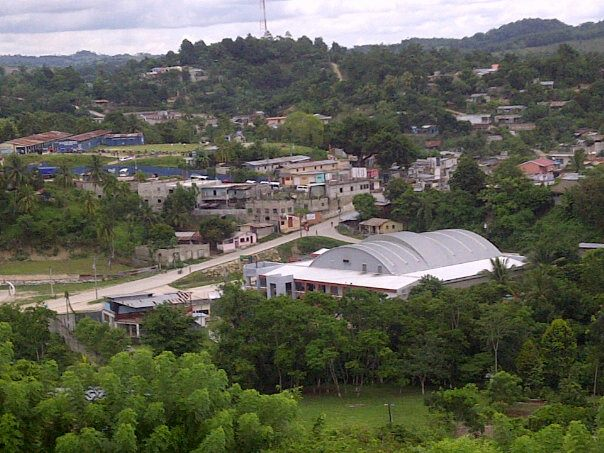
The modern town of San Luis, founded upon the Mopan capital

In March 1695, captain Juan Díaz de Velasco set out from Cahabón in Alta Verapaz with 70 Spanish soldiers, accompanied by a large number of Maya archers from Verapaz, and native muleteers; four Dominican friars led by Criollo friar Agustín Cano accompanied the expedition. Theoretically the Spanish soldiers were provided solely as an escort for the Dominicans. The Guatemalan expedition, under orders of President Jacinto de Barrios Leal, were secretly trying to reach the Itzas before Martín de Ursúa could reach them from Yucatán; the existence of the expedition was carefully concealed during all communications between Guatemala and the governor of Yucatán. It formed a part of a three-pronged attack against the independent inhabitants of Petén and neighbouring Chiapas; the other two expeditions were launched against the Lakandon.

The expedition proceeded northwards through Chʼol territory and into Mopan territory; there they camped at Mopan town (modern San Luis). Due to their fear of their warlike Itza neighbours, both the Chʼol and the Mopans claimed not to know of any paths to Lake Petén Itzá. The Spanish were held up at Mopan for several days by supply problems and desertions among their native carriers. The Dominicans took advantage of the delay to proselytise the Mopans and Cano wrote that he had converted four caciques (native chiefs) there, although Taxim Chan, king of the Mopans, had fled with many of the local inhabitants. Cano believed that the Mopans were ruled by the king of the Itzas.

===== First skirmish =====
The Spanish believed that by pressing ahead to Lake Petén Itzá they would link up with a simultaneous expedition headed by President Barrios himself, unaware that Barrios had not reached the region. Díaz de Velasco sent out a scouting party of 50 musketeers accompanied by native archers on 6 April. They soon found evidence of recent Itza camps in the area, estimated to be a month old. The scouts found a clear road heading north to the Itza kingdom, and the army set off along it. The main force camped about ten leagues (Note: The Spanish legua unit of measurement was equal to 5000 varas. This was approximately 2.6 miles (4.2 km). All distances in this article are based upon this conversion but are subject to often very approximate estimates given in the sources.) (26 miles or 42 km) south of the lake, while a smaller scouting party was sent off ahead; this consisted of two Spanish soldiers, two archers and two muleteers from Verapaz, with two Chʼol-speaking native interpreters. The scouting party advanced to the savannah just to the south of Lake Petén Itzá, where they encountered about 30 Itza hunters armed with spears, shields and bows, accompanied by hunting dogs. The hunters drew their weapons and prepared to fight, but the Mopan interpreter was instructed to explain that the Spanish party were traders who came in peace, accompanied by missionaries. The Spanish began to suspect that the interpreter was plotting against them with the Itza hunters, and one of the Verapaz archers dragged him out from among the hunters. The encounter degenerated into a scuffle, and the Itzas once again drew weapons. The Spanish fired their muskets, fatally wounding two hunters, and a Verapaz Indian charged the Itzas with a machete. The hunters fled, leaving the scouting party in possession of the food and arrows at the hunting camp.

===== Second skirmish =====
Five days after this skirmish, Antonio Machuca led a party of 12 musketeers, 25 archers and 13 muleteers to try to find President Barrios, to scout a river route to the lake and to capture another interpreter, the previous one no longer being trusted. The main party arrived on the savannah near the lake. The following night one of the advance party came back into camp with an Itza prisoner, captured after a fierce struggle with the scouts. Interrogation of the prisoner revealed that he was from a high-ranking Itza lineage, and that he had been sent out to find the Spanish party and to see if they came as traders or invaders. The rest of Machuca's scouting party soon returned to the main camp, reporting that they had camped four leagues (approximately 10.4 miles or 16.7 km) from the lake, where they encountered another hunting party of about "a dozen" Itzas. The Spanish tried to use their interpreter to talk to them but the Itzas responded with a volley of arrows. The Spanish musketeers tried to respond with musketfire, but found their gunpowder too wet to fire properly. The Itza warriors charged upon them with spears, axes and machetes, and the ensuing hand-to-hand battle lasted an hour, during which six of the Itzas were killed; the rest finally retreated. Thanks to their padded cotton armour, the Spanish party received no injuries from the skirmish. The Spanish pursued the fleeing Itzas and another fierce skirmish ensued, lasting another hour during which most of the remaining Itzas were killed. Three Itzas escaped, and their leader was rendered unconscious with machete blows to the head; he was taken prisoner and later made a full recovery. Machuca's party reached the lakeshore and could see Nojpetén across the water, but saw such a large force of Itzas that they retreated south, back to the main camp.

An Itza account of this encounter reached the colonial authorities in Yucatán via Tipuj. The Itza reported that the Guatemalan party approached on horseback to within sight of Nojpetén, and about thirty curious Itzas gathered to talk to the intruders, whereupon they were attacked by the Spanish, resulting in the deaths of thirty Itzas, the capture of one and yet more wounded. A Christian Maya emissary from Bacalar-at-Chunjujubʼ, Yucatán, was in Nojpetén around this time, and reported that the Itza gathered 3,000–4,000 warriors ready to repulse Díaz de Velasco's party.

===== Retreat to Guatemala =====
On 24 April, the first prisoner escaped from the main camp; the same day that the injured second prisoner was taken in by Machuca and his men. Interrogation of the new prisoner, who turned out to be an Itza nobleman, revealed that the Itza kingdom was in a state of high alert to repel the Spanish. Friar Cano met with his fellow Dominicans to discuss what should be done, having had information from both Machuca and his prisoner that the Itza were ready for war. The Dominicans were highly critical of the Spanish soldiers' readiness to open fire on poorly armed natives who offered no real threat to them, and suspected that President Barrios was nowhere near the lake; furthermore the Spanish were beginning to succumb to sickness, and the Verapaz Indian recruits were deserting daily. Díaz agreed with the Dominicans; two muleteers had already died from sickness, and he recognised that the size of his expedition was not sufficient for a full confrontation with the Itza nation. The expedition almost immediately withdrew back to Cahabón. The new prisoner, AjKʼixaw was later taken back to Santiago de los Caballeros de Guatemala, where the Dominicans questioned him in detail. In Guatemala AjKʼixaw learnt Spanish and returned to Petén in 1696 as a guide and interpreter for another expedition, before turning on his captors. After the Spanish retreated to Guatemala, rumours ran rife among the Itza and Kowoj that they would return to engage in wholesale slaughter of the Maya population; large tracts of territory were abandoned in response, including many towns in an area stretching from Lake Petén Itzá eastwards to Tipuj and southwards to Mopán.

==== García de Paredes' entry from Yucatán, May 1695 ====
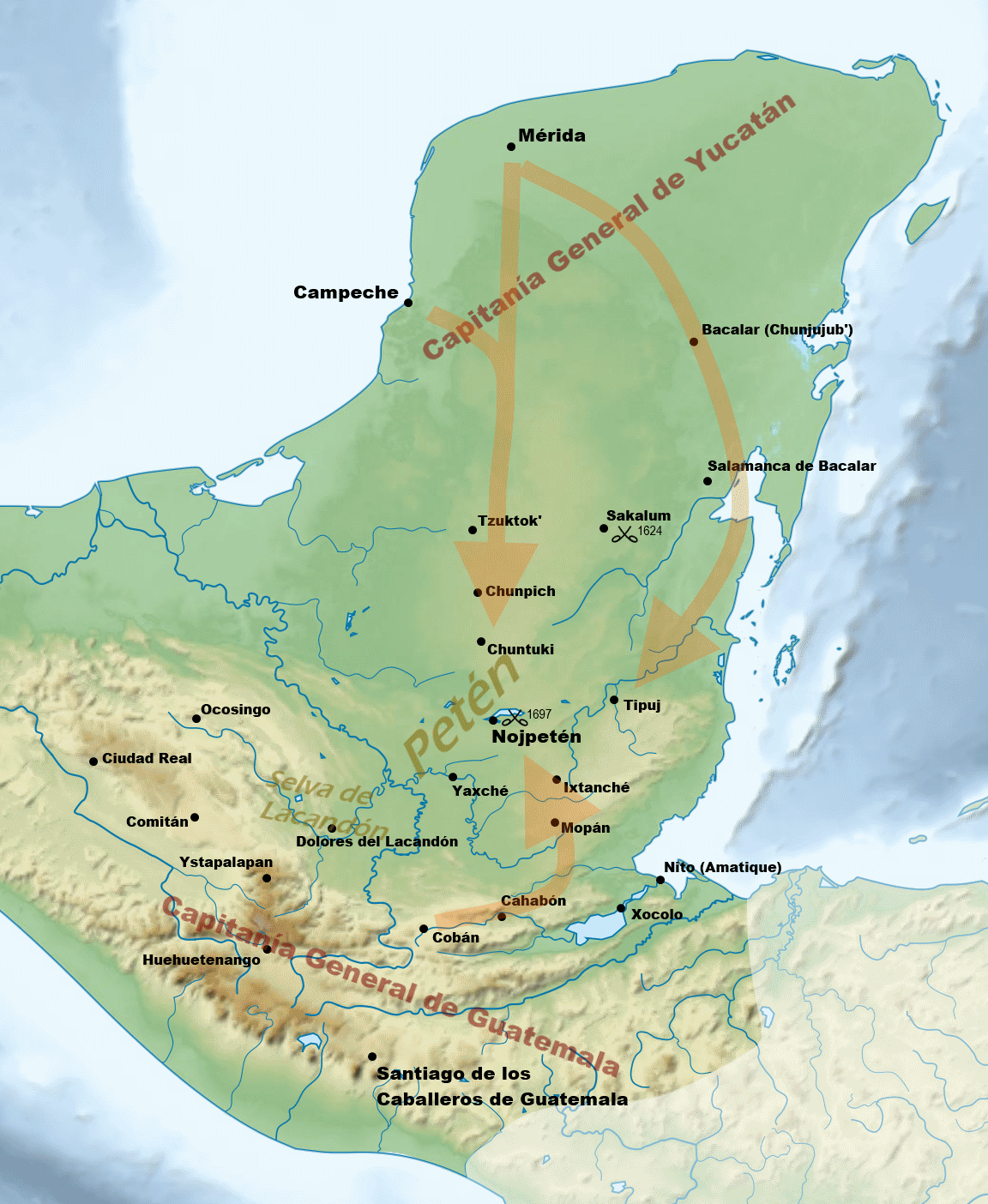
17th-century entry routes to Petén from Yucatán and Guatemala, with some of the placenames mentioned in the text

When captain García de Paredes unexpectedly returned to Campeche in early May 1695, governor Martín de Ursúa was already preparing reinforcements for his expedition. With García's arrival, he was immediately allocated the extra soldiers. On 11 May Ursúa ordered García to begin a second expedition southwards and was allotted 100 salaried Maya to accompany him. These workers were to be paid three pesos per month and received a suspension of their obligations to supply encomienda work and tribute. García paid for additional Spanish soldiers from his own funds, as did José Fernández de Estenos, a Campeche resident who was to serve as second-in-command. The final force numbered 115 Spanish soldiers and 150 Maya musketeers, plus Maya labourers and muleteers; the final tally was more than 400 people, which was regarded as a considerable army in the impoverished Yucatán province. Ursúa also ordered two companies of Maya musketeers from Tekʼax and Oxkʼutzkabʼ to join the expedition at Bʼolonchʼen Kawich, some 60 kilometres (37 mi) southeast of the city of Campeche. Bonifacio Us was captain of the Tekʼax company; Diego Uk was that of the Oxkʼutzkabʼ company. Marcos Pot was overall "cacique captain" of these two Maya companies; all three officers were Maya. A Maya company from Sajkabʼchen served as elite musketeers charged with rounding up forest Maya into the reducciones; this company was excused from heavy labour duties. Non-Maya soldiers were a mix of Spanish, mestizos (mixed race Spanish and native) and mulattos (mixed race Spanish and black).

On 18 May Ursúa requested three missionaries to support the expedition from the Franciscan provincial superior, friar Antonio de Silva; by 30 May three friars were ready to join the Spanish force, accompanied by a lay brother who had not yet taken vows. In addition, Silva sent another group of Franciscans led by friar Andrés de Avendaño, who was accompanied by another friar and a lay brother. This second group was only to remain with García while convenient for them to do so, and were to continue onwards independently to Nojpetén to make contact with the Itzas, with the tacit approval of Ursúa. In fact Avendaño and his party left Mérida on 2 June, a week before the party assigned to García. On 23 June Ursúa received a message informing him of the occupation of Sakbʼajlan (Dolores del Lakandon) by Guatemalan troops. By this time García was at Tzuktokʼ, near the Kejache border. Although Ursúa's purported plan, as authorised by the Spanish crown, was to build a road uniting Yucatán with Guatemala, he now realised that he was in a race to conquer the Itza kingdom; President Barrios of Guatemala had reached Sakbʼajlan and was returning to Santiago to prepare another expedition, and Guatemalan soldiers had already reached the lakeshore of Petén Itzá. Any linking road to Dolores del Lakandon would have passed through sparsely inhabited territory; instead the Yucatecan surveyor plotted a route due south directly to the lake where it could connect with the south road via Cahabón in Verapaz. This route would leave Dolores del Lakandon and the Lakandon Chʼol isolated to the west. Ursúa issued new orders to García dissimulating his desire to conquer the Itza. His letter ordered García to link up with President Barrios at Dolores del Lakandon, and gave him a precise route that would take him instead to the lake. A short time after receiving these orders, García ordered the construction of a fort at Chuntuki, some 25 leagues (approximately 65 miles or 105 km) north of Lake Petén Itzá. This would serve as the main military base for the Camino Real ("Royal Road") project; the supply base was at Kawich, under the command of Juan del Castillo y Arrué. On 27 July Ursúa authorised the creation of three new militia companies of 25 men apiece to reinforce García. Two were Spanish companies and one was a mixed-race company consisting of mestizos and pardos. (Note: The term pardo was frequently used by the Spanish to refer to mulattos but was also used to refer to mixed-race black and indigenous.)

===== Skirmish at Chunpich =====
The Sajkabʼchen company of native musketeers pushed ahead with the road builders from Tzuktzokʼ to the first Kejache town at Chunpich, which the Kejache had fled, leaving behind a substantial amount of food. The company's officers sent for reinforcements from García at Tzuktokʼ but before any could arrive some 25 Kejache returned to Chunpich with baskets to collect their abandoned food. The nervous Sajkabʼchen sentries feared that the residents were returning en masse and discharged their muskets at them, with both groups then retreating. The musketeer company then arrived to reinforce their sentries and charged into battle against approaching Kejache archers. Several musketeers were injured in the ensuing skirmish, and the Kejache retreated along a forest path without injury, mocking the invaders. The Sajkabʼchen company followed the path and found two more deserted settlements with large amounts of abandoned food. They seized the food and retreated back along the path.

===== Reinforcements =====
Around 3 August García moved his entire army forward to Chunpich, and by October Spanish soldiers had established themselves near the source of the San Pedro River. By November Tzuktokʼ was garrisoned with 86 soldiers and more at Chuntuki; in that month García once again returned to Campeche. By December 1695 Ursúa was under pressure to complete the conquest of the Itza, and he approved the despatch of reinforcements along the Camino Real to join the main garrison. The reinforcements included 150 Spanish and pardo soldiers and 100 Maya soldiers, together with labourers and muleteers. An advance group of 150 mixed Maya and non-Maya soldiers met up with García at Campeche and proceeded southwards along the Camino Real towards the San Pedro River. The rest of the reinforcements did not leave Campeche until March 1696.

==== Avendaño's entry from Yucatán, June 1695 ====
In May 1695 Antonio de Silva had appointed two groups of Franciscans to head for Petén; the first group was to join up with García's military expedition. The second group was to head for Lake Petén Itza independently. This second group was headed by friar Andrés de Avendaño. Avendaño was accompanied by friar Antonio Pérez de San Román, lay brother Alonso de Vargas and six Maya Christians recruited from Mérida and towns en route to Campeche. This latter group left Mérida on 2 June 1695 and made its way to Juan del Castillo y Arrué's supply base at Kawich, set up to support García's military expedition. On 24 June Avendaño's party left Kawich and set off across sparsely inhabited territory. On 29 June they arrived at an abandoned Maya temple, which he referred to by the name Nojku, meaning "Big Temple". The Spanish had already passed through and had broken many "idols" but the friars climbed the temple and managed to find about 50 additional ceremonial sculptures, which they destroyed; they also placed a cross inside. The other group of friars, on their way to join García, passed through Nojku a few days later and found that local Maya had already placed new offerings within. Avendaño's group continued southwards and found increasing signs of habitation and arrived at the military camp of captain José Fernández de Estenos at the deserted Maya town of Nojtʼubʼ, which had been cleared by the Spanish under García some sixteen years previously.

Avendaño continued south along the course of the new road, finding increasing evidence of Spanish military activity, with the rounding up of local inhabitants and raiding of fields and orchards for provisions by Spanish troops. The Franciscans overtook García at Bʼukʼte, about 12 kilometres (7.5 mi) before Tzuktokʼ. Avendaño's party arrived at Tzuktokʼ, near the Kejache border, by 10 July and left two weeks later, around the same time that García arrived there with his captives rounded up at Bʼukʼte for forced labour. Before leaving, the Franciscans protested to García and his officers about the poor treatment of the local inhabitants; the officers promised better treatment of the Maya in future. On 3 August García advanced to Chunpich but tried to persuade Avendaño to stay behind to minister to the prisoners from Bʼukʼte. Avendaño instead split his group and left in secret with just four Christian Maya companions, seeking the Chunpich Kejache that had attacked one of García's advance companies and had now retreated into the forest. He was unable to find the Kejache but did manage to get information regarding a path that led southwards to the Itza kingdom. He met four exhausted Sajkabʼchen musketeers who were carrying a letter addressed to him from captain Fernández de Estenos. This letter explained that further south there were various deserted Maya towns with only rotten maize abandoned by their occupiers. Avendaño returned to Tzuktokʼ and reconsidered his plans; the Franciscans were short of supplies, and the forcefully congregated Maya that they were charged with converting were disappearing back into the forest daily. Additionally, the Spanish officers ignored the concerns of the friars and García was abducting local Maya women and children to be taken back to his encomienda for forced labour. The Franciscans set upon a different, ultimately unsuccessful, plan; they would follow the road back north to Jopʼelchʼen near Campeche city and attempt to reach the Itza via Tipuj. This route was blocked when the secular clergy prevented the Franciscans from attempting it. Antonio de Silva ordered Avendaño to return to Mérida, and he arrived there on 17 September 1695. The other group of Franciscans, led by Juan de San Buenaventura Chávez, continued following the roadbuilders into Kejache territory, through IxBʼam, Bʼatkabʼ and Chuntuki (modern Chuntunqui near Carmelita, Petén).

==== San Buenaventura among the Kejache, September–November 1695 ====
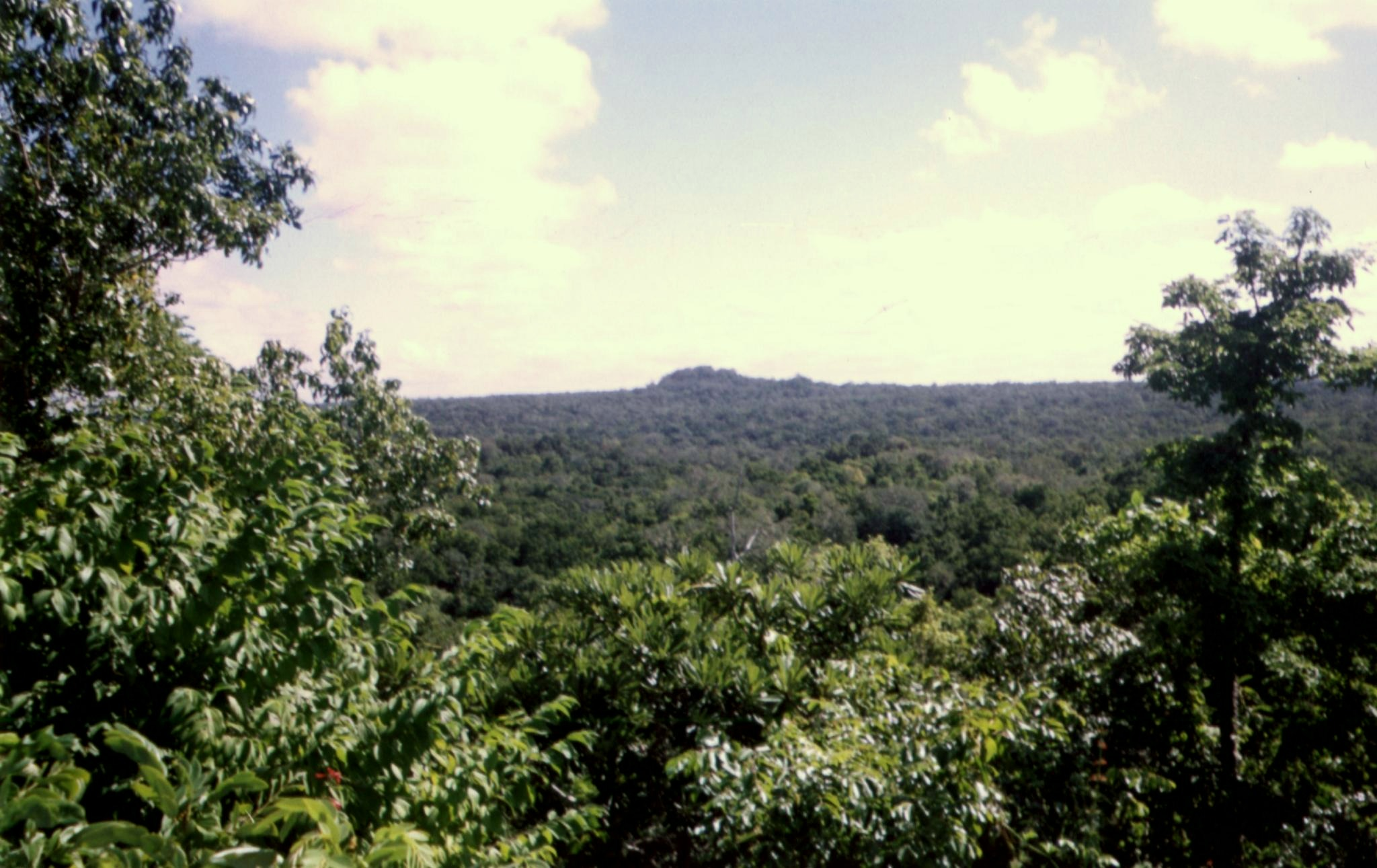
View of the forest of the Kejache region from El Tintal, near the former Spanish mission at Chuntuki

Juan de San Buenaventura's small group of Franciscans had arrived in Chuntuki on 30 August 1695, and found that the army had opened the road southwards for another seventeen leagues (approximately 44.2 miles or 71.1 km), almost halfway to Lake Petén Itzá, but returned to Chuntuki due to the seasonal rains. San Buenaventura was accompanied by friar Joseph de Jesús María, lay friar Tomás de Alcoser and lay brother Lucas de San Francisco. With Avendaño's return to Mérida, provincial superior Antonio de Silva despatched two additional friars to join San Buenaventura's group: Diego de Echevarría and Diego de Salas. One of these was to convert the Kejache in Tzuktokʼ, and the other was to do the same at Chuntuki. Although initially reluctant to permit the group to continue into Itza territory, by late October García de Paredes had relented and acquiesced to de Silva's instructions for San Buenaventura and his original companions to continue to Nojpetén, although it appears that this never happened. On 24 October San Buenaventura wrote to the provincial superior reporting that the warlike Kejache were now pacified and that they had told him that the Itza were ready to receive the Spanish in friendship. On that day 62 Kejache men had voluntarily come to Chuntuki from Pakʼekʼem, where another 300 Kejache resided. San Buenaventura sent lay brother Lucas de San Francisco to convince them to relocate to the Chuntuki mission. Lucas de San Francisco destroyed the idols in Pakʼekʼem but the inhabitants were not brought to the mission because of worries about feeding the new arrivals. Instead, in early November 1695, friar Tomás de Alcoser and brother Lucas de San Francisco were sent to establish a mission at Pakʼekʼem, where they were well received by the cacique and his pagan priest. Pakʼekʼem was sufficiently far from the new Spanish road that it was free from military interference, and the friars oversaw the building of a church in what was the largest mission town in Kejache territory. A second church was built at Bʼatkabʼ to attend to over 100 Kʼejache refugees who had been gathered there under the stewardship of friar Diego de Echevarría; a further church was established at Tzuktokʼ, overseen by Diego de Salas.

==== Avendaño's entry from Yucatán, December 1695 – January 1696 ====
Franciscan Andrés de Avendaño left Mérida on 13 December 1695, and arrived in Nojpetén around 14 January 1696; he followed the new road as far as possible then continued towards Nojpetén with local Maya guides. He was accompanied by friars Antonio Pérez de San Román, Joseph de Jesús María and Diego de Echevarría, and by lay brother Lucas de San Francisco; some of these he collected on his journey south along the Camino Real. On 5 January they caught up with and passed the main contingent of the army at Bʼatkabʼ, continuing to Chuntuki. From Chuntuki they followed an Indian trail that led them past the source of the San Pedro River and across steep karst hills to a watering hole by some ruins, which was recorded as Tanxulukmul by Avendaño. (Note: Tanxulukmul was also the name of an Itza refuge recorded in the Book of Chilam Bʼalam of Chumayel. This was probably the same place, and has been tentatively identified as the ruins of Akte, near the large Classic period site of Motul de San José, 3 kilometres (1.9 mi) from the north shore of Lake Petén Itza.) From Tanxulukmul they followed the small Acté River to a Chakʼan Itza town called Saklemakal. (Note: This Saklemakal can probably be identified with the ruins of Kantetul, 2 kilometres (1.2 mi) north of Motul de San José.) They arrived at the western end of Lake Petén Itzá to an enthusiastic welcome by the local Itza.

Unknown to the Franciscans, the northern Chakʼan Itza province of the Itza kingdom was allied with the Kowoj and was at war with the Itza king. The Chakʼan Itzas carried off most of the gifts that the Spanish party had brought for the Itza king, in an effort to hinder friendly relations developing. The following day, the current Aj Kan Ekʼ travelled across the lake with eighty canoes to greet the visitors at the Chakʼan Itza port town of Nich, on the west shore of Lake Petén Itza. The Franciscans returned to Nojpetén with Kan Ekʼ and baptised over 300 Itza children over the following four days. Avendaño tried to convince Kan Ekʼ to convert to Christianity and surrender to the Spanish crown, without success. The Franciscan friar tried to convince the Itza king that the Kʼatun 8 Ajaw, a twenty-year Maya calendrical cycle beginning in 1696 or 1697, was the right time for the Itza to finally embrace Christianity and to accept the king of Spain as overlord. The king of the Itza, like his forebear, cited Itza prophecy and said the time was not yet right. He asked the Spanish to return in four months, at which time the Itza would convert and swear fealty to the King of Spain.

On 19 January AjKowoj, the king of the Kowoj, arrived at Nojpetén and spoke with Avendaño, arguing against the acceptance of Christianity and Spanish rule. The discussions between Avendaño, Kan Ekʼ and AjKowoj exposed deep divisions among the Itza – and the apparent treachery of the Itza king in offering his kingdom to the Spanish undermined Kan Ek's power over his own people. Kan Ekʼ learnt of a plot by the Kowoj and their Chakʼan Itza allies to ambush and kill the Franciscans, and the Itza king advised them to return to Mérida via Tipuj. The Itza king's efforts to save his Spanish guests effectively ended his power to rule; from that point on anti-Spanish sentiment governed Itza responses to the Spanish. The Franciscans were guided to Yalain where they were well received but while they were there the Yalain heard rumours of battle and a Spanish advance towards Lake Petén Itzá. The Franciscans were shown a path that led to Tipuj but their Yalain guides soon abandoned them. The Spanish friars became lost and suffered great hardships, including the death of one of Avendaño's companions, but after a month wandering in the forest found their way back to Chuntuki and from there made their way back to Mérida.

==== Battle at Chʼichʼ, 2 February 1696 ====
Kan Ekʼ had sent emissaries to Mérida in December 1695 to inform Martín de Ursúa that the Itza would peacefully submit to Spanish rule. By mid-January captain García de Paredes had advanced from Bʼatkabʼ to the advance portion of the Camino Real at Chuntuki. By now he only had 90 soldiers plus labourers and porters, with many of his soldiers deserting as the force advanced towards Lake Petén Itzá; they were further delayed by the necessity of building an oar-powered longboat (or piragua) to cross the San Pedro River. Soon after Avendaño's flight eastward from Nojpetén, a group of 60 Maya warriors entered Chuntuki in full warpaint and bearing weapons; they claimed to have been sent by Avendaño to collect religious regalia and another friar. This was not the case, and they were almost certainly a scouting party sent by the Kowoj and their Chakʼan Itza allies to see what progress the Spanish army was making along the road. They spoke with García and then rapidly departed without taking any of the items that they had supposedly been sent to collect. García despatched two Kejache scouts to the lakeshore to discover Avendaño's whereabouts; at the same time Avendaño's Kejache guides were returning to Chuntuki from Nojpetén with news of Avendaño's flight. The Itzas at the lake handed over an open letter written by Avendaño before his departure from Nojpetén as a token of friendship between the Itza and the Spanish. Friar Juan de San Buenaventura was enthused by the letter and wished to travel on to Nojpetén himself.

García sent captain Pedro de Zubiaur, his senior officer, on towards the lake. He arrived at Lake Petén Itza with 60 musketeers, friar San Buenaventura and another Franciscan and allied Yucatec Maya warriors. They were also accompanied by about 40 Maya porters. On 2 February the expedition was approached by two Itza warriors who told them of a recent battle between a Guatemalan expedition and the Itza; these two Itzas guided the party to a nearby Itza settlement, and the letter from Avendaño was shown to captain Zubiaur, convincing him that he could advance safely. The port town of Chʼichʼ was abandoned but a large number of canoes approached, judged to be as many as 300 by the Spanish captain, bearing perhaps 2,000 Itza warriors. The warriors began to mingle freely with the Spanish party and began to load the Spanish supplies into the canoes with a promise of transporting the expedition across to Nojpetén, with one soldier in each canoe. The Franciscans readily boarded the canoes, with two soldiers as an escort. A scuffle then broke out; a dozen more of the Spanish party were forced into canoes, and two porters were beaten to death. One of the captured Spanish soldiers was immediately decapitated. At this point the Spanish soldiers opened fire with their muskets, and the Itza retreated across the lake with their prisoners.

The Spanish party retreated from the lake shore and regrouped on open ground where they were surrounded by about 2,000 Itza warriors who attempted to disarm them; the Itzas managed to seize another Spaniard and immediately struck off his head. At this point about 10,000 Itza archers appeared from canoes concealed among the lakeside mangroves, and Zubiaur ordered his men to fire a volley that killed between 30 and 40 Itzas. Realising that they were hopelessly outnumbered, the Spanish retreated towards Chuntuki, abandoning their captured companions to their fate. A Christian Maya musketeer and six other Indians fled at the start of the battle and took news to García that the entire expedition had been slaughtered; Zubiaur and the survivors of his expedition marched back into the base camp at Chuntuki two days later. Ursúa later reported that the Spanish prisoners were taken back to Nojpetén where they were all killed; this was also confirmed by AjChan at a later date. The bones of the dead were said to have been found by the Spanish after the final assault on Nojpetén in 1697; AjKʼin Kan Ekʼ, the Itza high priest, later reported that he had bound San Buenaventura and his companion into cross shapes and cut out their hearts.

This turn of events convinced Martín de Ursúa that Kan Ekʼ would not surrender peacefully, and he began to organise an all-out assault on Nojpetén. The enlistment of previously authorised reinforcements was now urgent, but was hindered when 70 of 100 soldiers mutinied and never reached García's camp. Work on the road was redoubled and about a month after the battle at Chʼichʼ the Spanish arrived at the lakeshore, now supported by artillery. Again a large number of canoes gathered, and the nervous Spanish soldiers opened fire with cannons and muskets; no casualties were reported among the Itza, who retreated and raised a white flag from a safe distance.

==== Amésqueta's entry from Verapaz, February–March 1696 ====
The Guatemalan authorities were unaware of ongoing contacts between the colonial authorities in Yucatán and the Itza. In the second half of 1695 President Barrios began planning another expedition against the Itza from Verapaz, following harsh criticism of Juan Díaz de Velasco's retreat from near Lake Petén Itzá in April of that year. Barrios died in November, and oidor José de Escals became acting head of the Guatemalan colonial administration. He appointed oidor Bartolomé de Amésqueta to lead the next expedition against the Itza. Amésqueta marched his men through torrential rain from Cahabón to Mopán, arriving on 25 February 1696; the Guatemalans were still unaware of the clashes between García's forces and the Itza. Amésqueta's expedition was suffering from shortages of native labour and supplies. Twenty-five of his 150 men were sick, and his advance stalled as the force rested up at Mopán. Captain Díaz de Velasco volunteered to lead a party of 25 men ahead to the lake; he was accompanied by Dominican friars Cristóbal de Prada and Jacinto de Vargas. He was also accompanied by AjKʼixaw, the Itza nobleman who had been taken prisoner on Díaz's previous expedition, who served as a trusted guide, scout and translator. They set out from Mopán on 7 March and left some sick soldiers with some supplies after five days, they then caught up with an advance party of roadbuilders and their military escort at Río Chakal. The two forces combined, giving Díaz a force of 49 soldiers and 34 porters and archers from Verapaz. Once they arrived at IxBʼol, near the shore of Lake Petén Itzá, AjKʼixaw was sent ahead as an emissary to Nojpetén.

===== Amésqueta's attempt to locate Díaz de Velasco =====
Back in Mopán, Amésqueta had received additional supplies and decided to catch up with his advance party. He left Mopán on 10 March 1696 with friar Agustín Cano and about 10 soldiers. He arrived at Chakal a week later but there was still no word from Díaz or AjKʼixaw. On 20 March Amésqueta left Chakal with 36 men and four days' supplies to find Díaz's party, whom he assumed would be nearby. After two days travelling in intense heat they met up with some Verapaz porters that Díaz had left behind. They followed Díaz's trail to the shore of Lake Petén Itzá near to the Itza capital. As they scouted along the south shore they were shadowed by about 30 Itza canoes, and more Itzas approached by land but kept a safe distance. There were plentiful signs that Díaz's party had passed that way, and Amésqueta assumed that they had crossed to Nojpetén. He wrote a letter to Díaz, which was passed to an Itza onlooker who indicated he would deliver it. Various Itzas now approached the party, including a nobleman who exchanged gifts with Amésqueta. During various attempts at communication to verify Díaz's whereabouts the Itza became agitated and responded angrily, although no-one in the Spanish party could understand the Itza language. The Itzas indicated that the Spanish should proceed to the lakeshore along a narrow path and embark in the small canoes that were stationed nearby. One of Amésqueta's officers recognised an Indian among the Itzas as a Mopan who had served as a soldier in Díaz's first expedition and thought that the Mopan was trying to tell him not to trust the Itzas.

Amésqueta was extremely suspicious of the small canoes being supplied, knowing that the Itza had 30-man canoes; he was also aware that tricking enemies into small canoes was a favoured tactic among the lowland Maya to separate and kill Spanish intruders. He suspected that AjKʼixaw had betrayed them and that this was precisely what had happened to Díaz and his men. As nightfall approached, low on rations, in a vulnerable location and with no sign of Díaz and his men, Amésqueta retreated from the lakeshore and his men took up positions on a small hill nearby. In the early hours of the morning he ordered a retreat by moonlight, using just a few torches. They arrived back at Chakal on 25 March and from there retreated to San Pedro Mártir on 9 April, beset by worsening conditions, a hurricane, sickness and rumours of enemies. The battered expedition set up a base camp nine leagues (approximately 23.4 miles or 37.7 km) north of Mopan.

===== Fate of Díaz de Velasco's expedition =====
Writing after the fall of Nojpetén, friar Cano described the ultimate fate of Díaz de Velasco and his companions; he claimed to have received the information from interviews with the soldiers from Yucatán who had stormed the Itza capital and from Chʼol witnesses, although there were no Chʼol at Nojpetén. Díaz's party arrived at the lakeshore and were told by local Itza that Franciscan friars were at Nojpetén. They were wary at first and asked for proof, upon which an Itza messenger brought them a rosary as a token. Looking across the lake they saw men dressed as friars calling to them to come across, these were Itza dressed in the habits of the two Franciscans who had recently been killed at the island. Díaz and his companions then boarded the Itza canoes, leaving thirty Maya porters with their mules and supplies.

Once on the lake the Itza overturned some of the canoes and killed some of Díaz's men; others were wounded and dragged ashore to be killed. Díaz, the Dominicans and two other men were in a large canoe that was not overturned and were taken to Nojpetén where a fierce struggle ensued as Díaz attempted to defend himself with his sword, killing several Itzas. The two other men were immediately killed while the friars were beaten and tied to X-shaped crosses before having their hearts cut out. Across the lake, the Itza attacked the porters guarding the expedition supplies and killed all of them. The Itza killed a total of 87 expedition members, including 50 soldiers, two Dominicans and about 35 Maya helpers. The remains of the small group that were killed on Nojpetén were later retrieved by the Spanish after the fall of the city and were taken back to Santiago de los Caballeros de Guatemala for burial.

===== Aftermath of Amésqueta's entry =====
Over the following weeks scouts were sent out to try to make contact with local Mopan and Chʼol communities, including Chok Ajaw, AjMay, IxBʼol and Manche without success – most of the natives had fled, leaving the forest deserted. At San Pedro Mártir he received news of AjChan's embassy to Mérida in December 1695 and the formal surrender of the Itza to Spanish authority. Unable to reconcile the news with the loss of his men at Lake Petén Itzá, and with appalling conditions in San Pedro Mártir, Amésqueta abandoned the unfinished fort. Friar Cano recommended to the new Guatemalan president that the Chʼol be moved to Verapaz where they could be properly administered. As a result of the failed expedition, Cano's recommendation was accepted, the fort was dismantled and any Maya that could be captured across a wide swathe of southern Petén was forcibly relocated to Belén near Rabinal in Verapaz. This way this relocation was conducted was brutal and ruthless and was condemned by several high-ranking colonial officials, including oidor José de Escals and even by Amésqueta.

=== Fall of Nojpetén ===
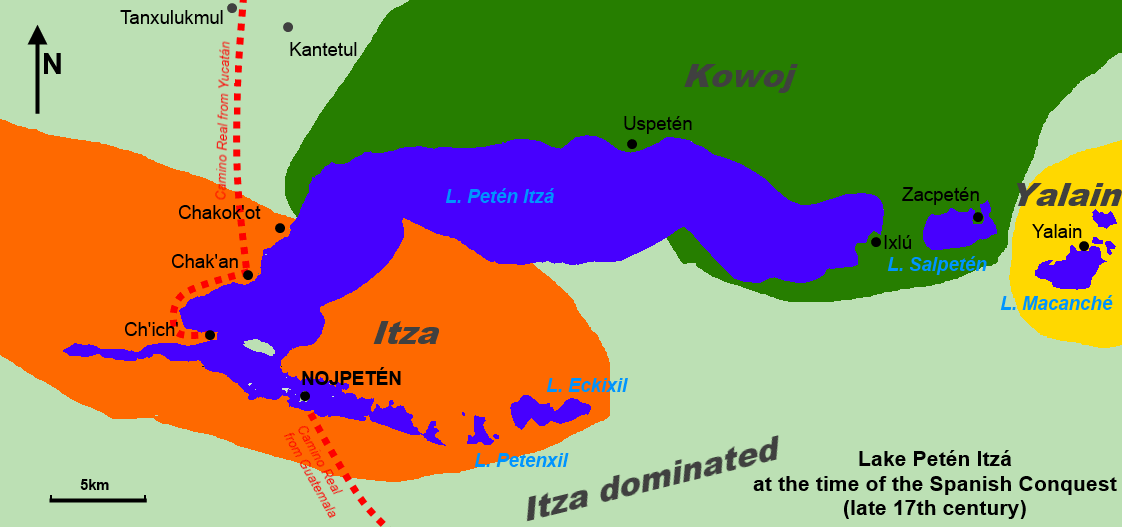
Lake Petén Itza at the time of the conquest

The Itzas' continued resistance had become a major embarrassment for the Spanish colonial authorities, and soldiers were dispatched from Campeche to take Nojpetén once and for all. The final assault was made possible by the gradual opening of the road from Mérida to Petén; by December 1696 this road had reached the lake shore although it was unfinished and still almost impassable in places. By this time the deep divisions between the political leaders of the Itza were such that a unified defence of the Itza kingdom had become impossible.

==== Final preparations ====
In late December 1696 the Chakʼan Itza attacked the large Kejache mission town of Pakʼekʼem; they abducted almost all the inhabitants and burned the church. The demoralised Spanish garrison at Chuntuki buried their weapons and ammunition and retreated five leagues (approximately 13 miles or 21 km) back towards Campeche. From late December 1696 to the middle of January 1697 Ursúa sent parties of soldiers and workmen along the road towards the lake; the first group was commanded by Pedro de Zubiaur and had instructions to begin building a galeota, a large oar-powered warship. This group was followed by reinforcements bringing supplies, including light and heavy weapons, gunpowder and food. On 23 January Ursúa left Campeche with more soldiers and muleteers, bringing the total number of soldiers arriving as reinforcements to 130. The Spanish fortified their positions at Chʼichʼ and deployed heavy artillery for its defence.

Martín de Ursúa y Arizmendi arrived on the western shore of lake Petén Itzá with his soldiers on 26 February 1697, and once there built the heavily armed galeota attack boat, which was assembled at Chʼichʼ over a space of 12 days in early March. The galeota had a keel of 30 cubits or 14.4 metres (47 ft); it had 12 oars on each side and a rudder with an iron screw. The galeota carried 114 men and at least five artillery pieces, including a pieza (light cannon) and four pedreros (mortars). The piragua longboat used to cross the San Pedro River was also transported to the lake to be used in the attack on the Itza capital; this boat had 6 oars and a rudder.

From 28 February onwards the Spanish expedition was repeatedly approached by hostile Itzas, who sometimes shot arrows in the direction of the intruders but inflicted no casualties. At the same time, small groups of curious Itzas mingled freely with the Spanish and received trinkets from them such as belts, necklaces and earrings.

==== Assault on Nojpetén ====
On 10 March, Itza and Yalain emissaries arrived at Chʼichʼ to negotiate with Ursúa. First came AjChan who had already met him in Mérida; he was followed by Chamach Xulu, the ruler of the Yalain. Kan Ekʼ then sent a canoe with a white flag raised bearing emissaries, including the Itza high priest, who offered peaceful surrender. Ursúa received the embassy in peace and invited Kan Ekʼ to visit his encampment three days later. On the appointed day Kan Ekʼ failed to arrive; instead Maya warriors massed both along the shore and in canoes upon the lake.

Ursúa decided that any further attempts at peaceful incorporation of the Itza into the Spanish Empire were pointless, and a waterbourne assault was launched upon Kan Ek's capital on the morning of 13 March. The encampment at Chʼichʼ was left defended by 25 Spanish soldiers, three Maya musketeers and several artillery pieces. Ursúa boarded the galeota with 108 soldiers, two secular priests, five personal servants, the baptised Itza emissary AjChan and his brother-in-law and an Itza prisoner from Nojpetén. The attack boat was rowed east from Chʼichʼ towards the Itza capital; halfway across the lake it encountered a large fleet of canoes spread in an arc across the approach to Nojpetén, covering about 600 metres (2,000 ft) from one shore to another – Ursúa simply gave the order to row through them. A large number of defenders had gathered along the shore of Nojpetén and on the roofs of the city. As the galeota approached, more canoes put out from the shore and the Spanish were surrounded. Once they had surrounded the galeota, Itza archers began to shoot at the invaders. Ursúa gave orders to his men not to fire but arrows wounded several soldiers; one of the wounded soldiers discharged his musket and at that point the officers lost control of their men. The defending Itza soon fled from the withering Spanish gunfire.

The city fell after a brief but bloody battle in which many Itza warriors died; the Spanish suffered only minor casualties. The Spanish bombardment caused heavy loss of life on the island; the surviving Itza abandoned their capital and swam across to the mainland with many dying in the water. After the battle the surviving defenders melted away into the forests, leaving the Spanish to occupy an abandoned Maya town. Martín de Ursúa planted his standard upon the highest point of the island and renamed Nojpetén as Nuestra Señora de los Remedios y San Pablo, Laguna del Itza ("Our Lady of Remedy and Saint Paul, Lake of the Itza"). The Itza nobility fled, dispersing to Maya settlements throughout Petén; in response the Spanish scoured the region with search parties. Kan Ekʼ was soon captured with help from the Yalain Maya ruler Chamach Xulu; The Kowoj king (Aj Kowoj) was also soon captured, together with other Maya nobles and their families. With the defeat of the Itza, the last independent and unconquered native kingdom in the Americas fell to the European colonisers.

==== Aftermath ====
Martín de Ursúa had little interest in administering the newly conquered territory and delegated its control to military officers who he did very little to support, either militarily or financially. With Nojpetén safely in the hands of the Spanish, Ursúa returned to Mérida, leaving Kan Ekʼ and other high-ranking members of his family as prisoners of the Spanish garrison at Nuestra Señora de los Remedios y San Pablo, isolated among the hostile Itza and Kowoj who still dominated the mainland. The garrison was reinforced in 1699 by a military expedition from Santiago de los Caballeros de Guatemala, accompanied by mixed-race ladino civilians who came to found their own town around the military camp. The settlers brought disease with them, which killed many soldiers and colonists and swept through the indigenous population. The Guatemalans stayed just three months before returning to Santiago de los Caballeros de Guatemala, taking the captive Itza king with them, together with his son and two of his cousins. The cousins died on the long journey to Santiago; Ajaw Kan Ekʼ and his son spent the rest of their lives under house arrest in the colonial capital.

When the Spanish conquered the Petén lakes in 1697, the Yalain were initially cooperative and assisted in the capture of the king of the Itza. At this time Yalain was ruled by Chamach Xulu. The Yalain leadership encouraged Christian conversion as a means of maintaining peace with the occupying Spanish forces. As time went on, Yalain cooperation with the Spanish appears to have decreased. Soon after the conquest, the Yalain fled their settlements to avoid foraging Spanish parties that were abducting Maya women for "service" at their barracks. At this time, such was the hostility that was felt towards the occupying forces that the inhabitants of the Yalain settlements preferred to burn their fields and break all their pottery rather than leave anything for the Spanish. The Yalain capital is recorded as having been burned in 1698.

== Final years of conquest ==
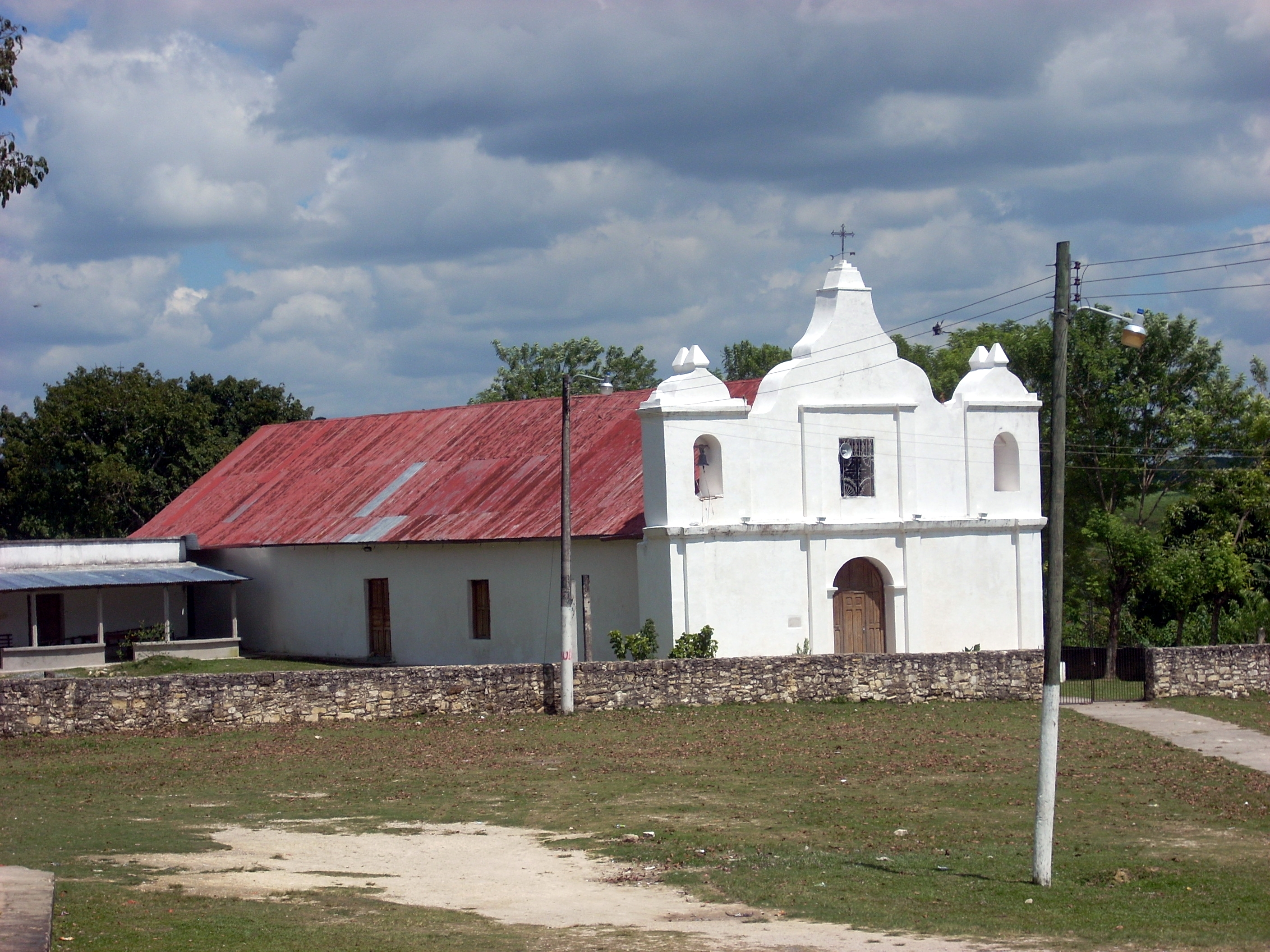
Spanish colonial church in Dolores

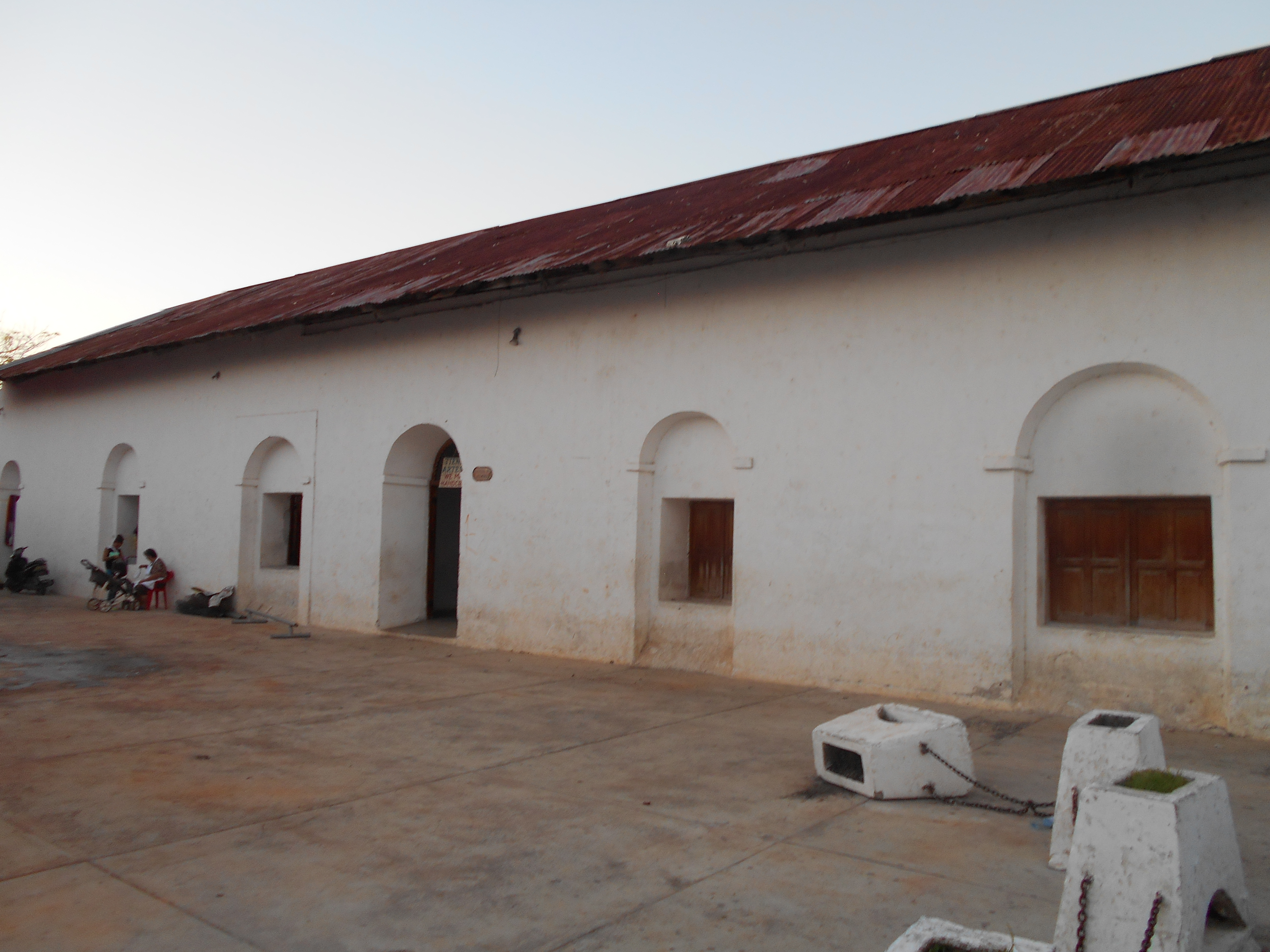
Castillo de Arismendi, built in Nuestra Señora de los Remedios (modern Flores)

In the late 17th century, the small population of Chʼol Maya in southern Petén and Belize was forcibly removed to Alta Verapaz, where the people were absorbed into the Qʼeqchiʼ population. After the conquest, the colonial administration of Petén was divided between the ecclesiastical authorities in Yucatán and secular administration as part of the Captaincy General of Guatemala. There was never a strong Spanish presence in the area, which remained remote, although the Spanish built a fortress-prison, the Castillo de Arismendi; it was finished in 1700.

The distance from Nuestra Señora de los Remedios y San Pablo (formerly Nojpetén) to Mérida, combined with the difficult terrain and the hostility of the natives led to the road from Yucatán falling into a state of disrepair. In 1701 Ursúa y Arezmendi realised that the road was in such a poor state that the Spanish garrison could not be supplied from Yucatán. He wrote to the King of Spain, requesting that Petén be transferred from the jurisdiction of Yucatán to the Audiencia Real of Guatemala. In 1703 Ursúa's petition was granted, with the condition that the ecclesiastical authority over Petén would pass to the Dominican Order.

Between 1703 and 1753, reducciones were established at San José and San Andrés on Lake Petén Itzá, Santa Ana just south of the lake, and at San Luis, Santo Toribio and Dolores in the south (not to be confused with Dolores del Lakandon). Each of these mission towns had its own minister who answered to the vicario general with the Spanish garrison at Nuestra Señora de los Remedios y San Pablo. In the first decades of the 18th century, churches were built in five colonial towns: Dolores, Remedios, San Andrés, San José and Santo Toribio. The church in Dolores was built in 1708; the construction was probably overseen by Juan Antonio Ruiz y Bustamante. In 1699 there were nine priests in Petén but thereafter there was usually a shortage of clergy in colonial Petén. In spite of the objections of the Dominicans who had been working in southern Petén, the Franciscans continued to provide clergy from Yucatán, and it was the Franciscans who oversaw the spiritual welfare of Petén during the colonial period.

AjTut was one of the lords of the northern Chakʼan Itza province of the conquered Itza kingdom; friar Avendaño had met him during his expedition to Nojpetén. After the conquest he relocated from the north shore of Lake Petén Itzá to Mompana, a region lying between Lake Yaxha and the Classic period ruins of Tikal. For some years after the conquest he established the Mompana region as a refuge from the Spanish and engaged in internecine war against the surviving Kowoj to the south.

=== Reductions around Lake Petén Itzá ===
At the time of the fall of Nojpetén, there are estimated to have been 60,000 Maya living around Lake Petén Itzá, including a large number of refugees from other areas. It is estimated that 88% of them died during the first ten years of colonial rule owing to a combination of disease and war. Although disease was responsible for the majority of deaths, Spanish expeditions and internecine warfare between indigenous groups also played their part.

Catholic priests from Yucatán founded several mission towns around Lake Petén Itzá in 1702–1703. The first towns to be concentrated into colonial reducciones were Ixtutz, which became the new town of San José, and neighbouring San Andrés, both on the north shore of Lake Petén Itzá. They were first subjugated by one of Ursúa's officers, Cristobal de Sologaistoa, before being passed into the care of the Dominican friars for the Christian conversion of the inhabitants. Surviving Itza and Kowoj were resettled in the new colonial towns by a mixture of persuasion and force. Kowoj and Itza leaders in these mission towns rebelled against their Spanish overlords in 1704 and almost retook Nojpetén, but although well-planned, the rebellion was quickly crushed. Its leaders were executed, and most of the mission towns were abandoned; by 1708 only about 6,000 Maya remained in central Petén. The reductions failed in large part because the missionaries charged with converting the inhabitants could not speak the Itza language.

== Legacy of the conquest ==
Martín de Ursúa used his conquest of the Itza as a stepping stone to achieving the coveted post of Governor-General of the Philippines, which he took up in 1709. European-introduced diseases devastated the native population of Petén, with the effects of disease compounded by the psychological impact of defeat. The population around Lake Petén Itzá numbered between 20,000 and 40,000 in 1697. By 1714, a census recorded just over 3,000 individuals in Spanish Petén, including non-Indians. This number would not have included the so-called "wild" Maya living in the forest far from Spanish administration and control. By 1700 the new colonial capital of Petén was mainly inhabited by colonists, soldiers and convicts. During the second half of the 18th century, adult male Indians were heavily taxed, often being forced into debt peonage. Western Petén and neighbouring Chiapas remained sparsely populated, and the Maya inhabitants avoided contact with the Spanish.

San José, on the northwest shore of lake Petén Itzá, is the home of the last surviving speakers of the Itza language. The surname Kowoj still survives, but the Kowoj and Itza have fully merged and no longer exist as separate ethnicities. In modern times there is a history of conflict between San José (the former Itza town of Chakokʼot) and neighbouring San Andrés (the former Kowoj-allied town of Chakʼan), and this mutual hostility probably represents ancient hostility between the Itza and the Kowoj.

== Historical sources ==
Title page of Historia de la Conquista de la Provincia de el Itza produced in 1701, four years after the fall of Nojpetén, by the relator of the Council of the Indies

Hernán Cortés described his expedition to Honduras in the fifth letter of his Cartas de Relación, in which he details his crossing of what is now Guatemala's Petén Department. Bernal Díaz del Castillo accompanied Cortés on the expedition to Honduras. He wrote a lengthy account of the conquest of Mexico and neighbouring regions, the Historia verdadera de la conquista de la Nueva España ("True History of the Conquest of New Spain"). His account was finished around 1568, some 40 years after the campaigns it describes; it includes his own description of the expedition. In 1688 colonial historian Diego López de Cogolludo detailed the expeditions of the Spanish missionaries Bartolomé de Fuensalida and Juan de Orbita in 1618 and 1619 in his Los trés siglos de la dominación española en Yucatán o sea historia de esta provincia ("The three centuries of Spanish domination in Yucatán, or the history of this province"); he based it upon Fuensalida's report, which is now lost.

Franciscan friar Andrés Avendaño y Loyola recorded his own account of his late 17th century journeys to Nojpetén, written in 1696 and entitled Relación de las entradas que hize a la conversión de los gentiles Ytzaex ("Account of the expeditions that I made to convert the Itza heathens"). When the Spanish finally conquered Petén in 1697 they produced a vast quantity of documentation. Juan de Villagutierre Soto-Mayor was a Spanish colonial official who first held the post of relator of the Royal Chancery of Valladolid and later as that of the Council of the Indies. As such he had access to the large amount of colonial documents stored in the General Archive of the Indies. From these he produced his Historia de la Conquista de la Provincia de el Itza, reduccion, y progressos de la de el Lacandon, y otras naciones de indios barbaros, de la mediacion de el Reyno de Guatimala, a las provincias del Yucatan en la América Septentrional ("History of the Conquest of the Province of the Itza, reduction, and advances in that of the Lakandon, and other nations of barbarous indians, and the intervention of the Kingdom of Guatemala, and the provinces of Yucatan in Northern America"). This was first published in Madrid in 1701 and detailed the history of Petén from 1525 through to 1699.

== Archaeology ==
Ursúa referred to the western port town of Chʼichʼ as Nich. The modern name for a point on the south side of the bay is Punta Nijtún, which is probably derived from the colonial Yucatec nix tun, meaning stone ramp. Archaeologists carried out excavations at the lake shore at Punta Nijtún and discovered a stone ramp there, which was probably built by Ursúa's troops to launch his galeota.

== See also ==
- History of Guatemala
- Flores Island, Guatemala
