= Martín de Ursúa =

Spanish Conquistador known for helping take over the last significant Mayan stronghold

Martín de Ursúa y Arizmendi (Spanish pronunciation: [maɾˈtin de wɾˈsu.a j aɾiθˈmendi]; February 22, 1653 – February 4, 1715), Count of Lizárraga and of Castillo, was a Spanish conquistador in Central America during the late colonial period of New Spain. Born in Olóriz, Navarre, he is noted for leading the 1696–97 expeditionary force which resulted in the fall of the last significant independent Maya stronghold, Nojpetén, located on an island in Lake Petén Itzá in the northern Petén Basin region of present-day Guatemala. He served as governor of the Yucatán until 1708, when he was named Governor-General of the Philippines. Around the time that he was named to that post, he was made a knight of the Order of Santiago. He died in Manila in 1715.

Ursúa arrived to Mexico around 1680 and initially served as a lawyer in Mexico City until 1692. He used this period to cement relationships with colonial officials in Yucatán. In 1692 he was appointed to be governor of Yucatán, with his term to begin in 1698. By 1694 he had been appointed as alcalde ordinario (a Spanish colonial official) of Mexico City. Ursúa took office in Yucatán four years earlier than planned, becoming acting governor on 17 December 1694.

== Family tree ==
Martín de Ursúa was from a line of distinguished and successful noblemen that was extremely well connected politically and that intermarried with other influential noble families to form a kinship network that was spread across Europe and the Americas:

General Pedro de Ursúa y Arizmendi	?	Diego Egües y Beaumont; Governor and Captain General of Nueva Granada
Pedro de Ursúa y Arizmendi de Egües; Count of Gerena	?
Pedro de Ursúa, Abbot of Pamplona	Martín de Ursúa y Arizmendi	Juana Bolio y Ojeda (criolla)

== See also ==
- Antonio María de Bucareli y Ursúa
- History of the Philippines (1521–1898)
- Spanish conquest of Guatemala
- Spanish conquest of Yucatán

== Notes ==
Preceded by Domingo Zabálburu de Echevarri	Governor General of the Philippines; 1708–1715	Succeeded by José Torralba
