= Fernando Manuel de Bustillo Bustamante y Rueda =

37th Governor-General of Spanish Philippines

Su Excelencia Fernando Manuel de Bustillo Bustamante y Rueda Governor-General of the Philippines

37th Governor-General of the Philippines
- In office August 9, 1717 – October 11, 1719
- Monarch: Philip V
- Governor: (Viceroy of New Spain); Baltasar de Zúñiga, 1st Duke of Arión
- Preceded by: Martín de Urzua y Arismendi
- Succeeded by: Francisco de la Cuesta

Personal details
- Born: 30 May 1663 Turanzo, Cantabria, Spain
- Died: 11 October 1719 (aged 56) Manila, Captaincy General of the Philippines, Spanish Empire

Fernando Manuel de Bustillo Bustamante y Rueda (May 30, 1663 - October 11, 1719) served as the 37th Governor-General of the Captaincy General of the Philippines from 1717 until his assassination.

== Governor-General of the Philippines ==
Usually called mariscal (marshal) as he was the first field marshal to govern the Islands, Bustamante was the former alcalde mayor of Trascala, in Nueva España (modern-day Mexico). He was appointed governor by royal provision on September 6, 1708 and arrived in Manila on August 9, 1717.

Considered severe in his judgments, Bustamante was also responsible for re-establishing the garrison in Zamboanga in 1718.

== Relationship with the Church ==
Several individuals with pending charges had taken church asylum. Bustamante adopted very stringent measures to counteract claims to immunity by Archbishop of Manila Francisco de la Cuesta. Archbishop De la Cuesta was told to either hand them over to the civil authorities or allow them to be taken. He refused to do either, supporting the claim of immunity of sanctuary. At the same time it came to the knowledge of the governor that a movement had set out on foot against him by those citizens who favoured the Archbishop's views.

José Torralba, the former acting-governor, was released from confinement by the governor, and reinstated by him as judge in the Supreme Court, although he was accused of embezzlement to the extent of ₱700,000. The Archbishop energetically opposed Torralba's appointment, notifying the latter of his excommunication and ecclesiastical censures. With sword and shield in hand, Torralba expelled the Archbishop's messenger by force, then as judge in the Supreme Court, hastened to avenge himself by issuing warrants against his enemies. Torralba's opponents sought church asylum, and, with the moral support of the Archbishop, laughed at the magistrates.

Tensions climaxed when the governor's soldiers stormed Manila Cathedral, thereby violating the right of sanctuary. The violation was due to the governor's orders to recover the government inventories and official records held by a notary public who was then taking refuge in the Cathedral. Upon consultation with the Archbishop, Dominican canon law experts from the Real Universidad de Santo Tomás declared that "under no circumstances or conditions could civil authorities exercise jurisdiction within sacred places, even under the orders of the governor and of the audiencia.

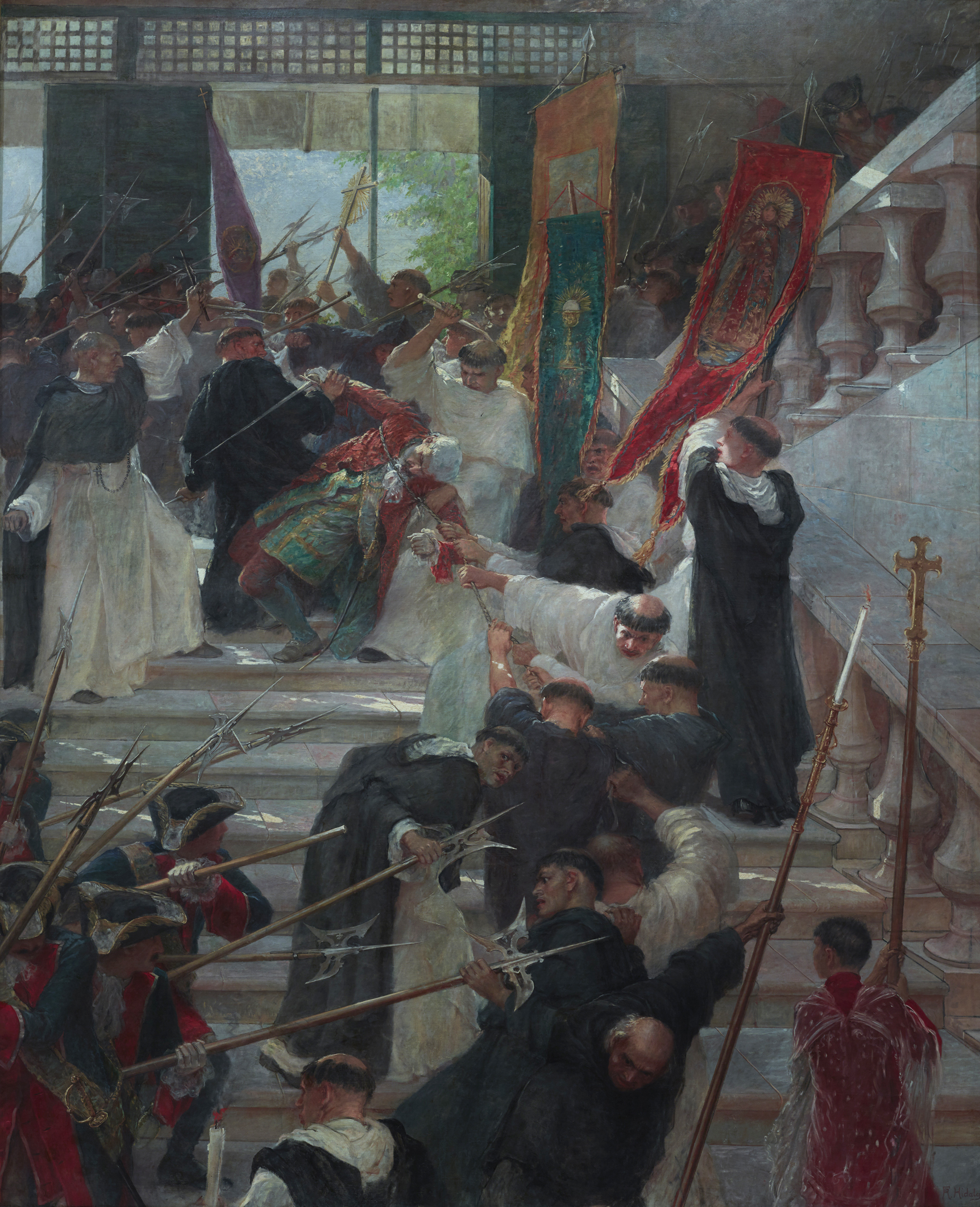
Hidalgo's interpretation of the assassination of Governor-General Bustamante.

The series of troubles with ecclesiastical authorities led to the arrest and imprisonment of Archbishop De la Cuesta, along with the Dominican friars and other clerics in league with the Archbishop.

== Assassination ==
In reaction to the Archbishop's imprisonment and to the government's total disregard of the church as a sanctuary, a mob of the Archbishop's supporters stormed the Palacio del Gobernador and killed Governor Bustamante. Archbishop De la Cuesta was released from prison and appointed acting Governor-General.

=== In art ===
Félix Resurrección Hidalgo's The Assassination of Governor Bustamante at the National Art Gallery of the National Museum depicts the incident, showing a mob of Dominican friars dragging the governor down the Palacio's staircase.

However, according to Spanish historian, theologian, and former archivist at the a University of Santo Tomás Fr. Fidel Villarroel, Ph.D., Hidalgo was misled by some advisers to wrongly portray the Spanish missionaries as the promoters of the murder. Antonio Regidor, a Freemason noted for his anticlerical sentiments, was the painter's adviser. Villarroel goes further by concluding that all the friars were far away from the scene at the moment of the assassination, imprisoned together with the Archbishop.

Political offices
Preceded by José Torralba	Spanish Governor - Captain General of the Philippines; August 9, 1717 – October 11, 1719	Succeeded by Francisco de la Cuesta (Archbishop of Manila)
