= Francisco de la Cuesta =

Spanish archbishop

Su Excelencia Reverendísima Francisco de la Cuesta
- Arzobispo de Manila
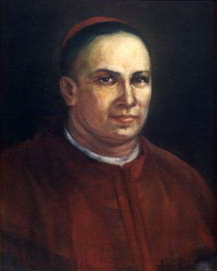
- Province: Manila
- See: Manila
- Installed: August 12, 1707
- Term ended: July 25, 1721
- Predecessor: Diego Camacho y Ávila
- Successor: Ángel Rodríguez, O.SS.T.

Personal details
- Born: 1661 Colmenar, outskirt of Madrid
- Died: May 30, 1724 (aged 62–63) Michoacan, Mexico
- Denomination: Roman Catholic
- Styles
- Reference style: Monseñor
- Spoken style: Su Excelencia Reverendísima
- Religious style: Reverendísimo

38th Governor-General of the Philippines
- In office October 11, 1719 – August 6, 1721
- Monarch: Philip V of Spain
- Governor: (Viceroy of New Spain); Baltasar de Zúñiga, 1st Duke of Arión
- Preceded by: Fernando Manuel de Bustillo Bustamante y Rueda
- Succeeded by: Toribio José Cosio y Campo

Francisco de la Cuesta (1661 – May 30, 1724), O.S.H. was the 12th Archbishop of Manila from 1707 to 1722, and Spanish Governor-General of the Philippines from 1719 to 1721.

== Biography ==
Francisco de la Cuesta was born in Colmenar, outskirt of Madrid. He was a master of theology and a preacher to the King of Spain. He was from the Order of Saint Jerome.

== Archbishop of Manila ==
He was appointed as Archbishop of Manila on 1706 and was consecrated in Mexico on August 12, 1707. As archbishop, he tried to enforce the episcopal visitation upon the order of Pope Clement XI but was opposed by the friars. As a result, he was forced to wait for their reports to Rome.

== Feud with Fernando Bustamante ==
de la Cuesta came in conflict with Fernando Bustamante, the Governor-General at that time. Tensions climaxed when the governor’s soldiers stormed the Manila Cathedral, thereby violating the right of sanctuary. The violation was due to the governor’s orders to recover the government inventories and official records held by a notary public who was then taking refuge in the cathedral. The series of troubles with the ecclesiastics led to the arrest and imprisonment of the archbishop, the Dominican friars, and all other clerics who support the Archbishop.

On October 11, 1719, according to popular account, angry friars led by the Franciscans, Dominicans and Augustinians instigated a siege on the Governor's Palace as a show of support for the imprisoned archbishop. In the terror and confusion of the palace guards, the now defenseless Bustamante and his son were murdered by the friars. De la Cuesta was released afterwards.

However, according to Fr. Prof. Dr. Fidel Villarroel, a respected Spanish historian, master theologian of the Dominican Order and former archivist at the University of Santo Tomas, Hidalgo was misled by some advisers to wrongly portray the Spanish missionaries as the promoters of the tragic murder. Antonio Regidor, a mason prominent for his anticlerical sentiments, was the painter’s adviser. Villarroel goes further by concluding that at the moment of the assassination of the governor, the friars were far away from the scene. They were imprisoned together with the Archbishop prior to the assassination by the mob.

== Governor-General of the Philippines ==
After his release, de la Cuesta appointed himself as the acting Governor-General and served for 2 years. It was due to the refusal of other officials in Manila to be the next Governor-General that de la Cuesta was in power. Also, the sees of Cebu, Nueva Segovia and Caceres were vacant during de la Cuesta's short term as Governor-General due to the deaths of the archbishops of the said sees. These sees will remain vacant until the transfer of de la Cuesta to Mexico.

== Bishop of Michoacan ==
On July 25, 1721, he was removed by the King of Spain due to the death of Bustamante and was transferred in Michoacan, Mexico. He was installed as Bishop of Michoacán on April 18, 1724. He died one month later on May 30, 1724, at the age of 63.

== Trivia ==
- The assassination of Bustamante was mentioned in Jose Rizal's Noli Me Tangere.
- A painting entitled “Assassination of Governor Bustamante” was done by Félix Resurrección Hidalgo depicting the friars murdering Bustamante by dragging him down the staircase. The painting is considered a National Treasure of the Philippines and hangs in the Hall of the Masters at the National Museum in Manila.

== External links and additional sources ==
- Cheney, David M. "Archdiocese of Manila". Catholic-Hierarchy.org. (for Chronology of Bishops) ^{[self-published]}
- Chow, Gabriel. "Metropolitan Archdiocese of Manila". GCatholic.org. (for Chronology of Bishops) ^{[self-published]}
- Cheney, David M. "Archdiocese of Morelia". Catholic-Hierarchy.org. (for Chronology of Bishops) ^{[self-published]}
- Chow, Gabriel. "Metropolitan Archdiocese of Morelia (Mexico)". GCatholic.org. (for Chronology of Bishops) ^{[self-published]}
- The Archdiocese of Manila Official Website
- Ang Mga ARSOBISPO. Accessed March 19, 2007.

Political offices
Preceded by Fernando Manuel de Bustillo Bustamante y Rueda	Spanish Governor-General of the Philippines; 1719–1721	Succeeded by Toribio José Cosio y Campo
Catholic Church titles
Preceded by Diego Camacho y Ávila	Archbishop of Manila; 12 August 1707 – 27 September 1723	Succeeded by Carlos Bermudez de Castro
Preceded by Felipe Ignacio Trujillo y Guerrero	Bishop of Michoacán; 27 September 1723 – 30 May 1724	Succeeded by Juan José de Escalona y Calatayud
