= Tabasco =

State of Mexico

- State
- Free and Sovereign State of Tabasco; Estado Libre y Soberano de Tabasco (Spanish)
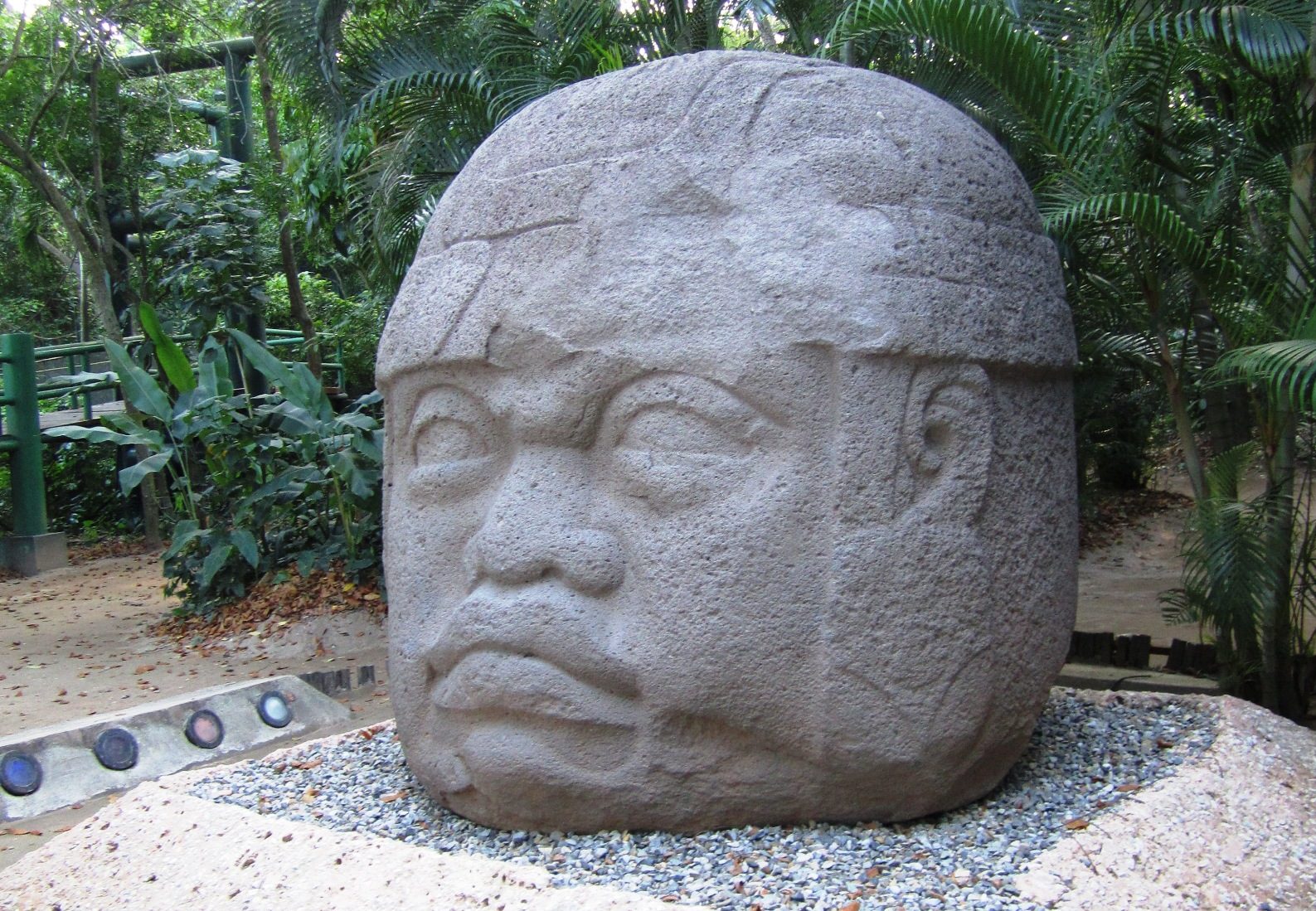
- Olmec colossal head at La Venta

- Coat of arms
- Nickname: El Edén de México (The Eden of Mexico)
- Anthem: Marcha Tabasco
- Coordinates: 17°59′17″N 92°55′10″W
- Country: Mexico
- Capital and largest city: Villahermosa
- Municipalities: 17
- Admission: February 7, 1824
- Order: 13th

Government
  - Governor: Javier May Rodríguez
  - Senators: Alejandra Arias Trevilla; Óscar Cantón Zetina; José Sabino Herrera Dagdug
  - Deputies: Federal deputies: 01: Julio Ernesto Gutiérrez Bocanegra; 02: Iván Peña Vidal; 03: Rosa Margarita Graniel Zenteno; 04: Jaime Humberto Lastra Bastar; 05: Beatriz Millánd Pérez; 06: Tey Mollinedo Cano

Area
  - Total: 24,731 km^{2} (9,549 sq mi)
- Ranked 24th
- Highest elevation: 1,100 m (3,600 ft)

Population (2020)
  - Total: 2,402,598
  - Rank: 20th
  - Density: 97.149/km^{2} (251.62/sq mi)
  - Rank: 12th
- Demonym: Tabasqueño (a)

GDP (2022)
  - Total: MXN 748 billion (US$37.2 billion)
  - Per capita: US$15,092
- Time zone: UTC−6 (CST)
- Postal code: 86
- Area code: Area codes: • 913; • 914; • 916; • 917; • 923; • 932; • 933; • 934; • 936; • 937; • 993
- ISO 3166 code: MX-TAB
- HDI: ▲0.784 high Ranked 18th of 32

Tabasco, (Note: Spanish pronunciation: [taˈβasko]) officially the Free and Sovereign State of Tabasco, (Note: Spanish: Estado Libre y Soberano de Tabasco) is one of the 32 federal entities of Mexico. It is divided into 17 municipalities and its capital city is Villahermosa.

It is located in southeast Mexico and is bordered by the states of Campeche to the northeast, Veracruz to the west, and Chiapas to the south and the Petén department of Guatemala to the southeast. It has a coastline to the north with the Gulf of Mexico. Most of the state is covered in rainforest as, unlike most other areas of Mexico, it has plentiful rainfall year-round. The state is also home to La Venta, the major site of the Olmec civilization, considered to be the origin of later Mesoamerican cultures. It produces significant quantities of petroleum and natural gas.

== Geography ==
The state is located in the southeast of Mexico, bordering the states of Campeche, Chiapas, and Veracruz, with the Gulf of Mexico to the north and the country of Guatemala to the south and east. The state covers 24,731 square kilometres (9,549 mi^{2}), which is 1.3 percent of Mexico's total. The northwestern portion is on the coastal plain of the Gulf of Mexico with the south and east as part of the mountain chain that extends into northern Chiapas. It is divided into seventeen municipalities. There are 36 communities designated as urban, with about 3,000 smaller towns and villages. 185 are classified as "regional development centers". Tabasco has seventeen municipalities: Balancán, Cárdenas, Centla, Centro (Villahermosa), Comalcalco, Cunduacán, Emiliano Zapata, Huimanguillo, Jalapa, Jalpa de Méndez, Jonuta, Macuspana, Nacajuca, Paraíso, Tacotalpa, Teapa and Tenosique.

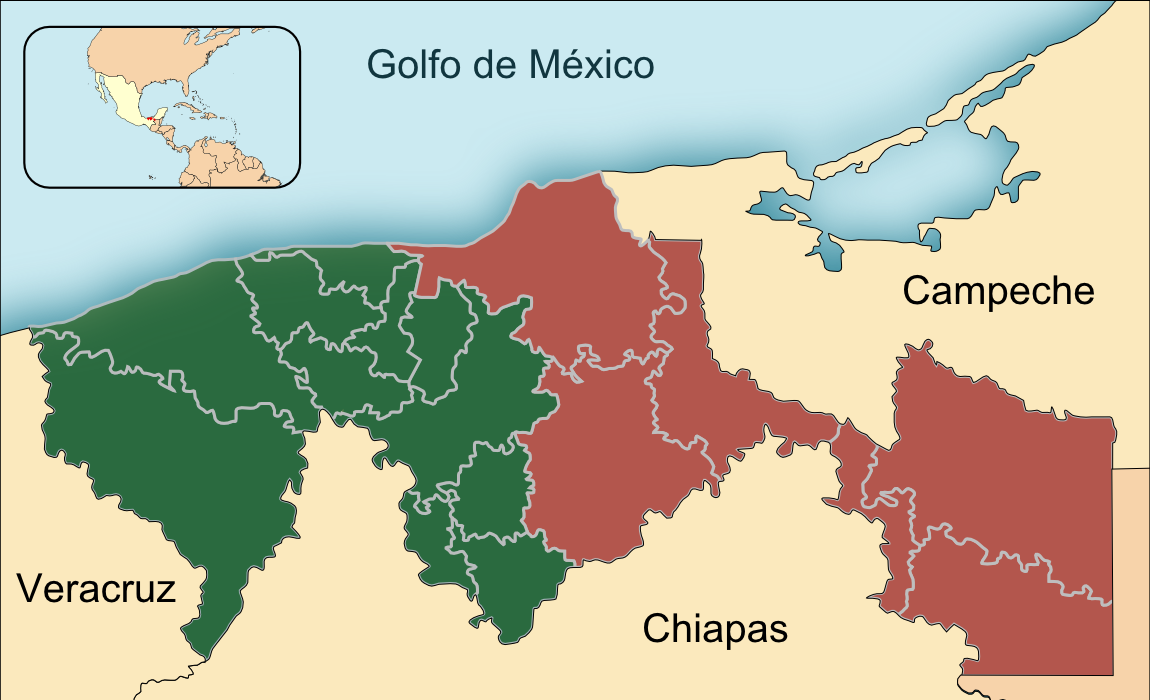
Regions of Tabasco

In 1994, the state was officially divided into two regions and five sub-regions for socioeconomic development and geographic documentation. The two major regions are called the Grijalva and the Usumacinta. The Grijalva Region is named after the river on which most of the municipalities here are dependent. It is the smaller of the two regions with a territory of 12,069.34 square kilometres (4,660.00 mi^{2}) or 48.94 percent of the state's territory; however, it contains most of Tabasco's urban population as well as of its socioeconomic and political activity. It is divided into three sub-regions called Chontalpa, Centro and Sierra; it includes the municipalities of Huimanguillo, Cárdenas, Comalcalco, Cunduacán, Paraíso, Jalpa de Méndez, Nacajuca, Centro, Jalapa, Teapa and Tacotalpa. The Usumacinta Region is named after the main river on which the Centla, Jonuta, Emiliano Zapata, Balancán and Tenosique municipalities depend. It is divided into the Pantanos and Ríos subregions, which are both more rural than the Grijalva Region.

The environment of the state consists of extensive low-lying floodplains, mountains and valleys. Most of the territory is covered with tropical rainforest and wetlands. There are also areas with savanna, beaches and mangrove forests. Much of the rainforest has suffered degradation due to over-logging and conversion of territory into farmland. The east is formed of low humid plains formed by sediment deposited by a number of rivers. In the Chontalpa zone and in parts of the municipalities of Centla and Jonuta, there are swampy depressions extremely vulnerable to flooding from both riverflow and from excessive rainfall. In the south there are some elevations which are part of the central mesa of Chiapas. The most important of these is El Madrigal, La Campana, La Corona, Pomaná, Coconá, Mono Pelado and El Tortuguero. However, most hills in the state do not exceed 30 metres (98 ft) above sea level.

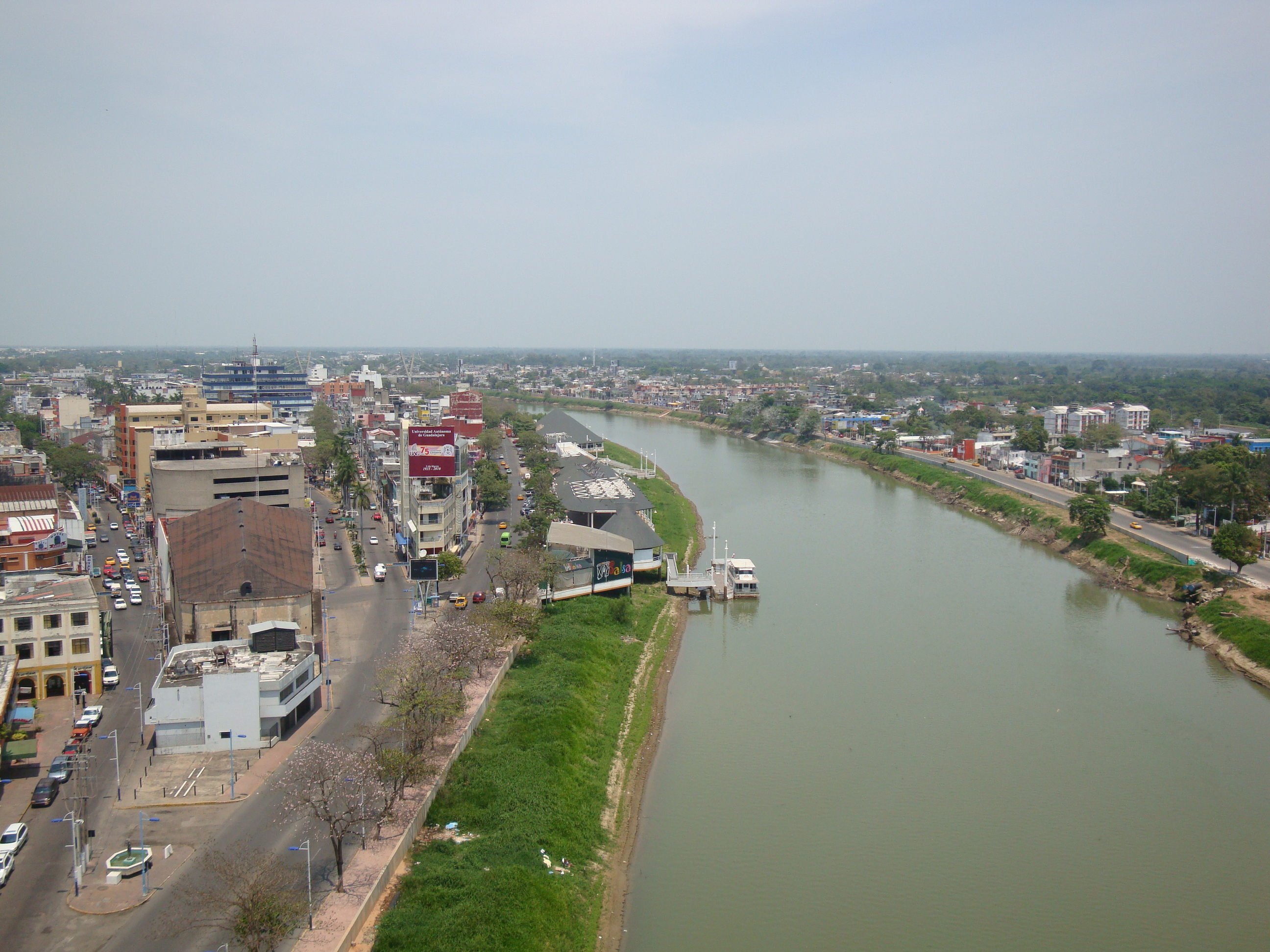
Grijalva River flowing through Villahermosa

Tabasco has 198.8 kilometres (123.5 mi) of shoreline, 29,800 hectares (74,000 acres) of estuaries, lakes and numerous rivers and streams. Flooding is a frequent occurrence, especially in September and November.

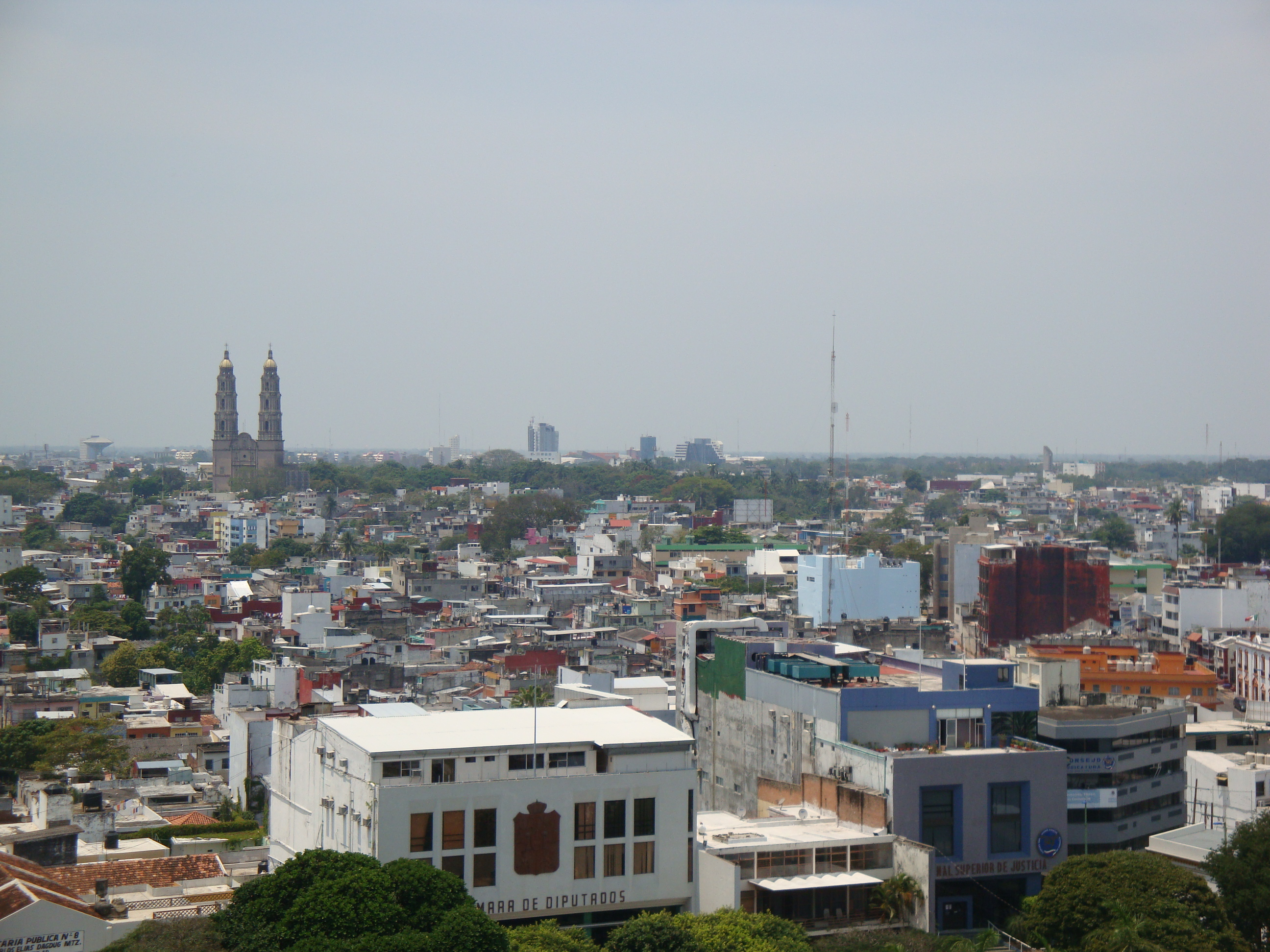
View of Villahermosa, the capital of Tabasco

There are four principal ecosystems in the state: tropical rainforest, tropical savannah, beaches and wetlands. Tropical rainforest dominates most of the state due to the high levels of rainfall the area receives. However, what exists today is only a fraction of what used to be, as much of the forest area has been over-exploited by man, mostly through logging and slash-and-burn agriculture. Most of the intact rainforest is found in the municipalities of Tenosique, Balancán, Macuspana, Teapa, Tacotalpa, Cárdenas and Huimanguillo.

These rainforests contain species such as mahogany, cedar, numerous types of palm, jacarandas, ceiba, Salix and many more. There are various types of orchids, bromeliads, tillandsia, ferns, and aroid plants native to the state, along with a variety of species of cactus, both terrestrial-arid and epiphytic-forest types. Examples include Epiphyllum anguliger, Schlumbergera, and Disocactus. This state also has one of the widest varieties of wildlife in the country, such as macaws, yellow-headed parrots, resplendent quetzal, numerous endemic hummingbirds, green iguana, and numerous species of snakes. Mammal species have declined because of deforestation, but still persist; one may encounter spider monkeys, squirrel monkeys, jaguar, ocelot, coatimundi, jaguarundi, oncilla, coyote, margay, bobcat, puma, raccoon, northern tamandua, prehensile-tailed porcupine, agouti, paca, woolly and common opossums, brocket deer, white-tailed deer, collared peccary and tapir.

Tropical savannah is mostly found in the southern part of the state, mixed in with areas of rainforest. These areas are dominated by grasses and bushes along with some smaller trees such as jahuacte, cocoyol and small palm trees. The savannah has wildlife such as rabbits, deer, foxes, and various species of birds.

Along the coast the soil is sandier and while the vegetation is still tropical, species are different from in the interior rainforest. They include coconut palms, palo mulato, royal palm, and pimento de Tabasco. These areas have suffered the most from slash and burn agriculture.

Most of the wetlands of the state belong to the Pantanos de Centla Biosphere Reserve. The abundance of fresh water in wetlands and river areas supports a wide variety of aquatic life such as freshwater gar, mojarra, crocodiles, various species of turtles and frogs, and many species of native and migratory waterfowl. In larger bodies of water manatees can be found. In the brackish and salt water lagoons various ocean species are found, as well as shellfish and mollusks, and bird species such as seagulls and pelicans.

Tabasco has a hot tropical climate, with the Gulf of Mexico having significant influence on weather patterns. Over 95 percent of the state's territory has a hot, wet climate. The rest is hot and semi-humid, located in the far northeast of the state. The average annual temperature is 27 °C (81 °F) with high temperatures averaging 36 °C (97 °F), mostly in May, and lows of 18.5 °C (65.3 °F) in January. Unlike many parts of Mexico, Tabasco has abundant year round precipitation. The state receives an average annual rainfall of 2,550 millimetres (8.37 ft). Rain occurs all year but is particularly heavy from June to October. The flat areas of the state are subject to frequent flooding. One reason for this is the rivers that flow from the Sierra region and the Usuamacinta River. Another is that there are a number of dams such as the Angostura, Chicoasén, Malpas and Peñitas; these are built for hydroelectricity and flood control, but can overflow.

The state has 17,138.2 hectares (42,349 acres) of state protected lands such as the Agua Blanca waterfalls and the Sierra State Park in Teapa. The Grutas de Coconá caves are classified as a natural monument with 422 hectares (1,040 acres). The Centla Biosphere Reserve covers an area of 302,706 hectares (748,000 acres). The Yumká Park and Laguna de las Ilusiones Ecological Reserves have 1,973.6 hectares (4,877 acres). The Laguna de la Lima Reserve has 36.2 hectares (89 acres). The Chontalpa Ecological Park has 277 hectares (680 acres). The Laguna del Camarón Ecological Park has 70 hectares (170 acres).

== History ==
=== Pre-Columbian period ===
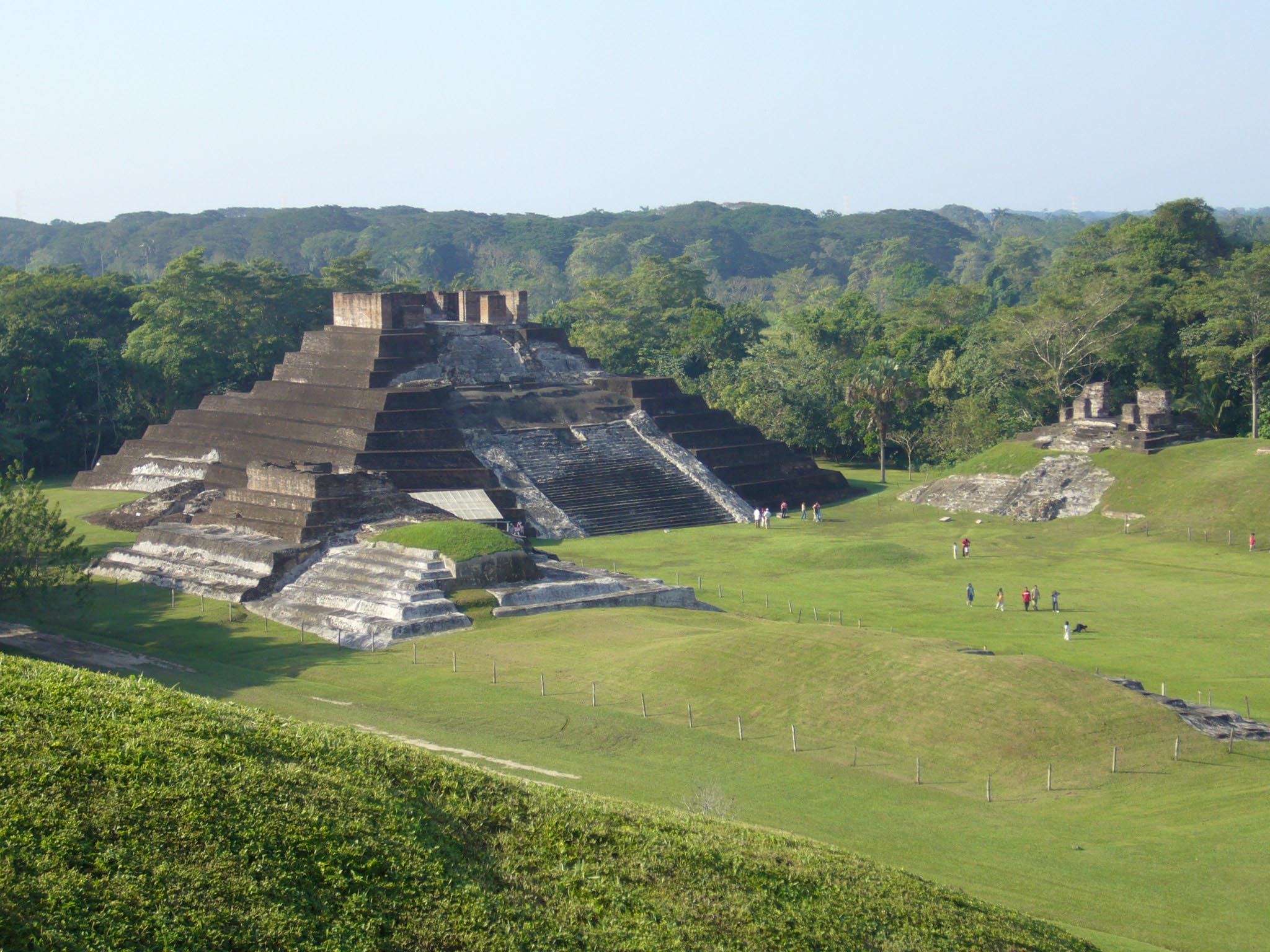
Comalcalco

The origin of the name Tabasco is not definitively known, with a number of theories debated among linguists. The name appears in the chronicles of Bernal Díaz del Castillo during the conquest era, who mentions a river named after local ruler Tabscoob. One possible theory states that it is from Nahuatl with two possible derivations: one meaning "place that has a lord" and the other "place where the land is moist". The state seal is that which was granted in 1598 to the town of Villahermosa, then called San Juan Bautista by Philip II of Spain. This is one of the oldest coats of arms in the Americas.

The Olmec civilization dominated much of what is now Tabasco 3,000 years ago, reaching a height around 800 BC. It was the oldest Mesoamerican culture, dominating what are now the states of Mexico, Guerrero, Oaxaca, Veracruz and Tabasco as well as parts of Central America, and is considered the founding culture for all of Mesoamerica. The main Olmec site in Tabasco is La Venta. The site covers an area of 5.3 square kilometres (2.0 mi^{2}) surrounded by swamps and marshes linked to the Tonalá River, 15 kilometres (9.3 mi) from the Gulf of Mexico. Around 300 AD, the Mayans began to dominate part of the state. Mayan sites include Comalcalco, Pomoná, El Tortuguero and Jonuta (Prehispanic). The Mayans in Tabasco reached their peak between the 6th and 7th centuries.

In the early 16th century, the territory of Tabasco was home to a number of relatively small polities. The Chontal Maya were the predominant ethnicity, and within Tabasco were divided into the provinces of Potonchán, Cupilco (located near Comalcalco), Zahuatan-Chilapa in the south (located near Jalapa and Macuspana), and Ixtapa-Usumacinta in the east (located near Tenosique). Of these, Potonchan was the most populous, and is sometimes considered to have been the capital of a kingdom known as Tabasco. The western coastal portion of the state was known as Ahualulco or Yahualulco and was inhabited by a mix of Nahuas and Popolucas (the latter being related to the Zoque people), though the Nahuas formed the political elite. However, the most important Nahua town was Cimatan, located near modern Cárdenas). Cimatan was the capital of a lordship that ruled over several Zoque towns to the south. Tabasco, in particular the region around Comalcalco and Villahermosa, was one of the major cacao-producing regions in late postclassic Mesoamerica, alongside Soconusco and certain parts of Central America.

The territory of Tabasco, together with portions of the neighboring states of Veracruz and Campeche, was a hotspot for regional trade, as the numerous rivers and lagoons made transportation by canoe very efficient. Local rulers, being connected by trade to many different regional powers, frequently aimed to balance their foreign relations in order to maximize their commercial profits. Many rulers were themselves successful merchants, rather than the hereditary monarchs typical elsewhere in Mesoamerica. The region had a reputation for being open-minded towards foreigners and patronizing the arts. Peter Gerhard estimated the population of Tabasco (excluding the modern municipalities of Cárdenas and Huimanguillo) in 1518 to be at least 200 thousand people.

=== Colonial era ===
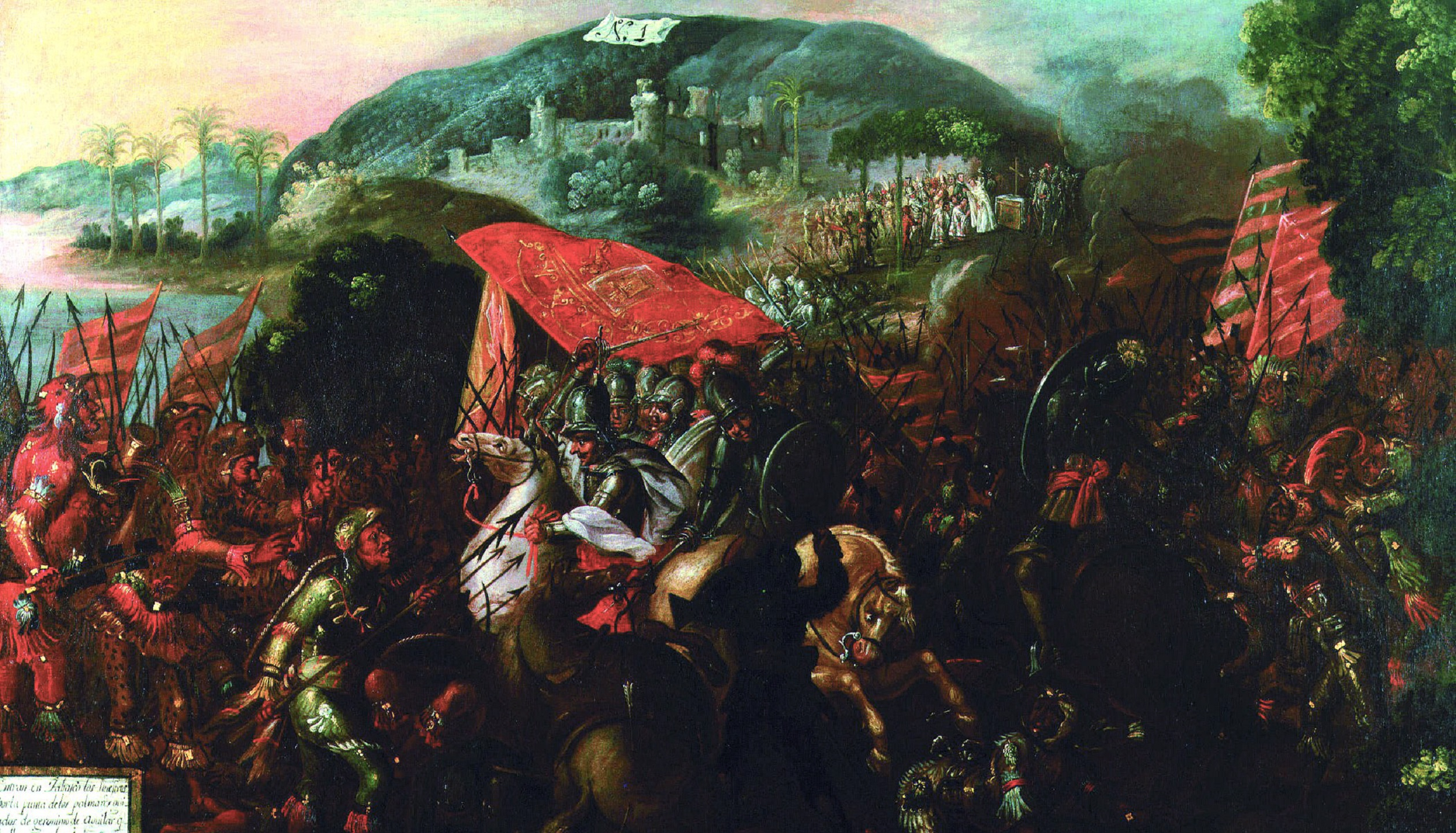
The entrance of Hernán Cortés into the city of Tabasco

The first contact with the Spanish came in 1518 when an expedition headed by Captain Juan de Grijalva disembarked at the mouth of the river that now bears his name. Hernán Cortés came the following year and fought the natives here at the Battle of Centla. As conqueror, Cortés received twenty female slaves, one of whom was La Malinche.

Despite the early conquest and the foundation of Santa María de la Victoria (today Frontera), the territory was not fully subjugated because of the climate, terrain and lack of minerals. The Franciscans arrived in the 16th century to evangelize, but they did not stay. For this reason, the indigenous people of this area were not generally converted to Catholicism, unlike other parts of New Spain. Tabasco was a landing and crossing point for the conquest of southern Mexico and Guatemala, referenced by Hernán Cortés in one of his letters to the Spanish Crown. It was noted by him and by Bernal Díaz del Castillo for its abundance of cacao.

The introduction of European diseases decimated the local population, resulting in the Spanish bringing African slaves to work plantations. This led to some mixing among the three races which has affected the ethnic appearance of the people of the state. Significant agricultural production was not achieved until the 18th century, primarily in cacao and cattle. During this time the sea traffic to Villahermosa increased, which made it a relatively important port. For the rest of the colonial period, most of Tabasco would have no major events and no major commerce in comparison to the rest of the country.

The Spanish did not begin to pacify the area until the second half of the 16th century, when Santa María de la Victoria was secured, slightly inland from the original Frontera location. However, in the meantime, English pirates had taken possession of the nearby Isla del Carmen and other points in the Gulf for piracy. Santa María de la Victoria was attacked and sacked, forcing the settlement to move inland in 1598 to San Juan Bautista (today Villahermosa), renamed Villa Hermosa by the Spanish Crown, which gave it the oldest coat of arms on the American mainland, today the seal of the state of Tabasco. At the beginning of the 18th century, Tabasco and Veracruz united to combat the pirate threat, and succeeded in expelling them from the Isla del Carmen. The city returned to its original and current location in 1795. At that time, the entire state had a population of only 36,000 in two towns, two villages, and various ranches and farms. The province sent a delegate to Spain to complain about the marginalization of the area to the Crown.

=== Independence and 19th century ===
The first insurgent during the Mexican War of Independence in the state was José María Jiménez, who declared the state's independence in 1815. However, Jiménez was soon jailed and local authorities proclaimed allegiance to the Crown. At the end of the war in 1821, Tabasco became one of the first fourteen states under the 1824 Constitution. The first state constitution was ratified in 1825. In 1883, the state was divided into seventeen municipalities.

Political instability in the state and an outbreak of cholera forced Tabasco to rejoin the federation. In 1836, a group of Conservatives took control of the federal government, but Tabasco Liberals decided to rebel against this government until they were defeated.

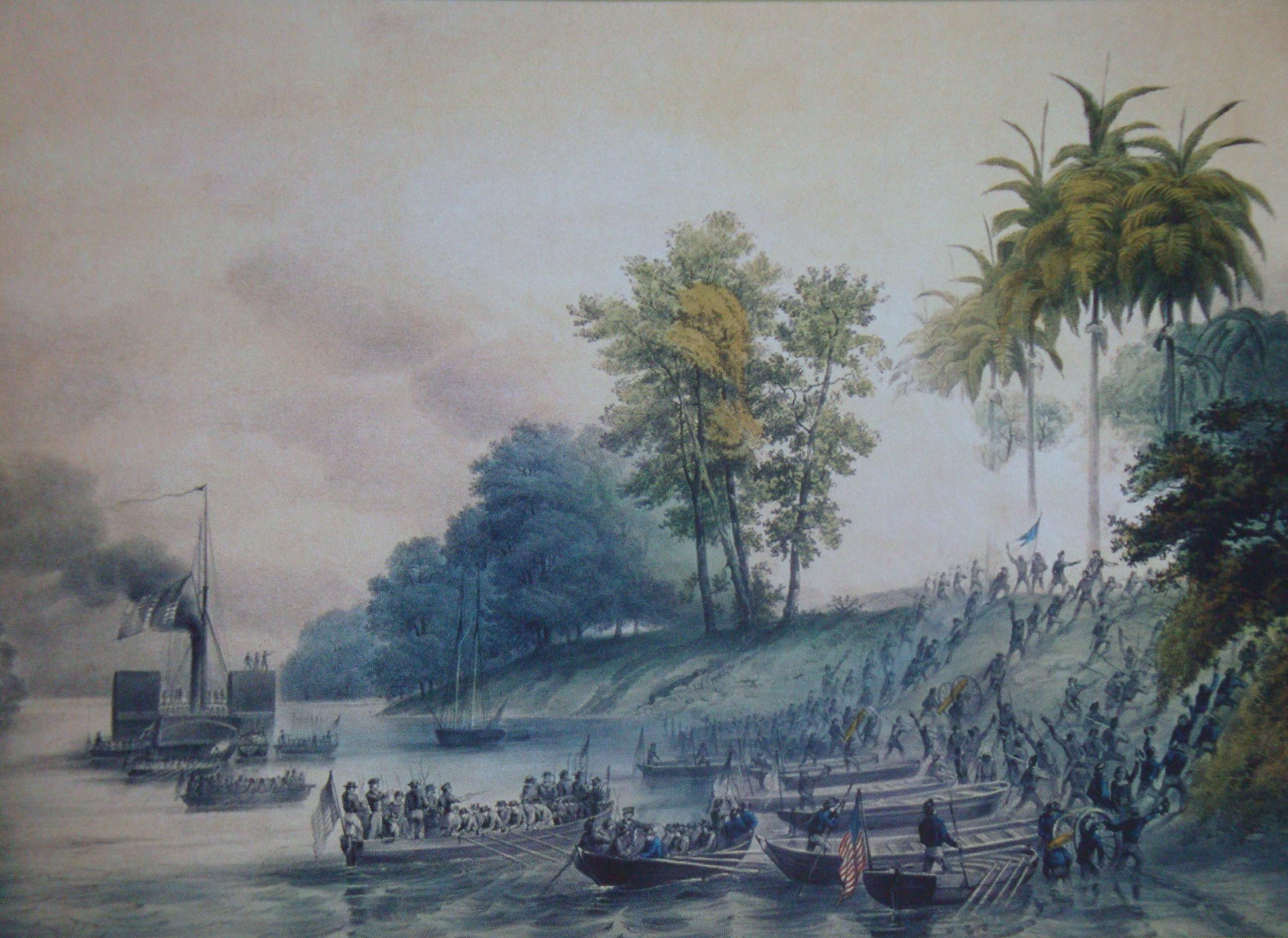
Image of the U.S. invasion of Villahermosa

During the Mexican–American War, troops under Matthew C. Perry arrived in Tabasco in 1846. Other ships arrived soon after and took possession of the port of Frontera. On their first attempt to take Villahermosa upriver, they failed. The second attempt bombarded the city before successfully taking it. However, the Tabascans formed guerrilla groups and this along with the inhospitable climate forced the U.S. military to withdraw soon after.

After the Americans left, Tabasco governor Justo Santa Anna rebelled against Mexico City over its lack of support during the war. The Americans returned in 1847 to attack the capital. It was defended by local troops, but they did not have the necessary supplies. The Americans occupied the capital for another thirty-five days, causing great destruction.

During the French intervention in Mexico, the French took Villahermosa in 1862, installing a governor. Tabasco's forces retreated into the mountains. Meanwhile, various Tabascans formed a newspaper called El Dissidente, which criticized the French-installed government. There were several insurrections against this government such as the one headed by Andrés Sánchez Magallanes in 1863. He raised a small army from various parts of the state and attacked the imperial army barracks in Comalcalco, then moved on to Villahermosa in November 1863. Here they encountered imperialist troops at what is now called the Battle of Jahuactal, where the insurgents won, expelling the French from the state.

The Porfirio Díaz period from the 1880s to 1910 was free from political violence and allowed the state to build infrastructure, but only slowly owing to its isolation. The capital, heavily damaged by decades of war, was reconstructed, with many old buildings torn down to make way for new ones. In 1879, the Instituto Juárez was inaugurated. In 1881, telegraph service connected Villahermosa with Mexico City. The capital received electricity in 1890, with the new state government palace opened in 1894 and the first bank in 1901. Tabasco experienced significant economic development during the Díaz period in the late 19th century, with cacao and other products shipped worldwide. However, this development led to widespread deforestation, which began in the latter decades of the 19th century when timber companies cut down large areas of rainforest.

While Díaz remained in power, Tabasco governor Abraham Bandala also remained from 1894 to 1910, re-elected to office sixteen times. Timber and agriculture made the elite in the state rich, with most of the rest of the population workers indebted to their employers. The technological progress was accompanied by poor and even slave-like conditions for many workers. This fueled resentment in the state and the rest of the country. This resentment led to the Mexican Revolution. In 1879, the first institute of higher education, the Instituto Juárez, was opened. During this time period, a woman by the name of Salomé Marín Virgilio founded schools in Balancán to teach workers to read and write along with liberal political ideas. Her work would later inspire José María Pino Suárez.

=== Mexican Revolution to the present ===
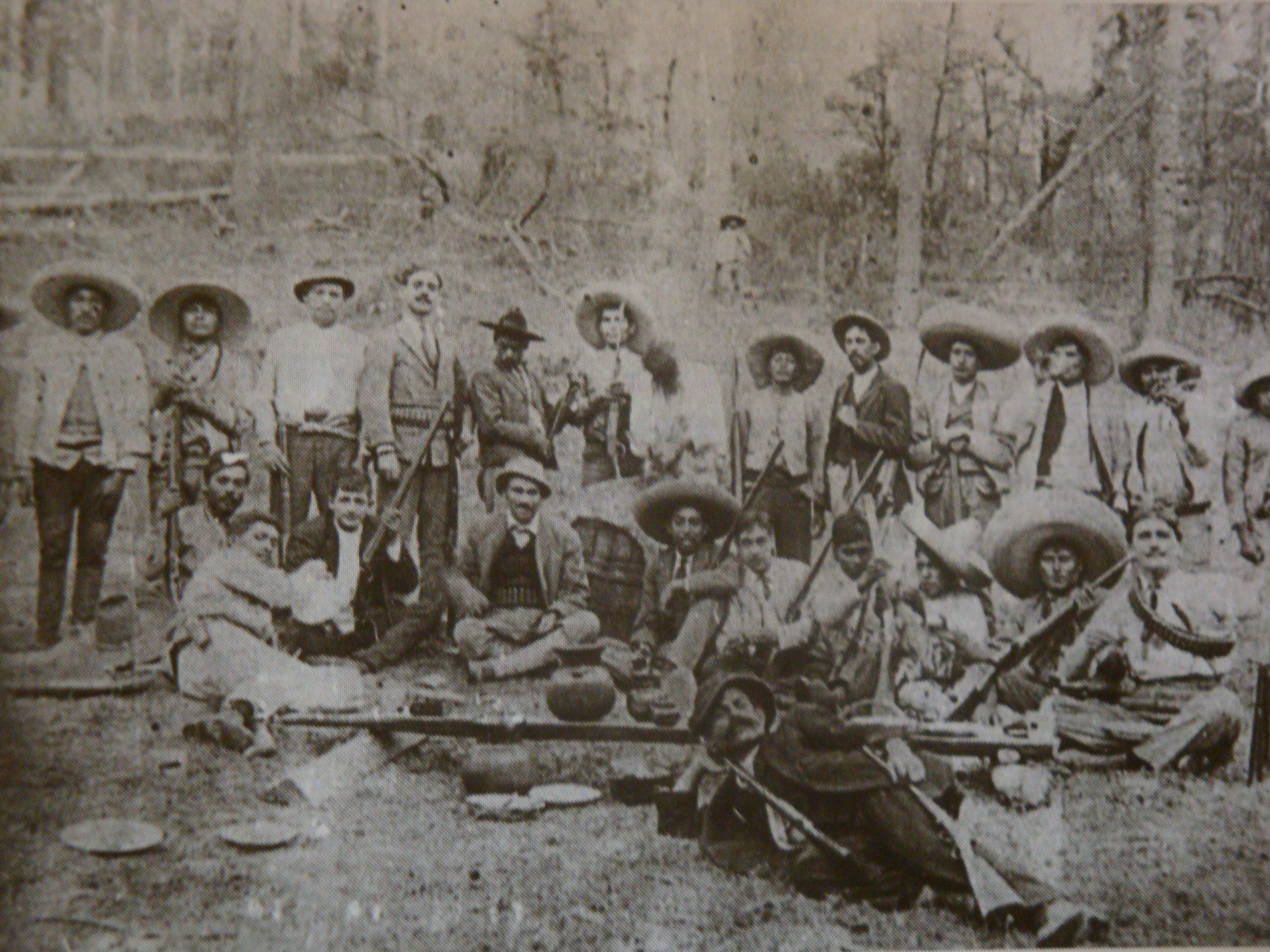
Group of revolutionaries from Tabasco

Anti-Díaz sentiment began in the decade of 1900 with efforts to keep Bandala from being re-elected. The first vocal opponent to the Díaz regime in Tabasco was local journalist Domingo Borrego. In Huimanguillo, Chontalpa, the first "Club Anti reelection Melchor Ocampo" was formed to oppose the government but it was disbanded quickly. By 1909, there were a number of large protests in the state which led to the formation of the Gutierrista Party, headed by Ignacio Gutiérrez Gómez along with his two brothers. These and others in the state joined forces politically with Francisco I. Madero and a new Club Anti-reelecionista was formed in Huimanguillo. These efforts succeeded in defeating Bandala and replacing him with Policarpo Valenzuela, calming the situation in the state for a short while. After Madero was assassinated, the politics of the state fractured, with various factions vying for the governor's position leading to insurrection and frequent government changes who were allied with the various armies vying for power nationally.

Another important episode in the history of the state was the governorship of Tomás Garrido Canabal after the end of the Revolution. He was elected in 1922, allied with Mexican presidents Álvaro Obregón and later Plutarco Elías Calles. He implemented an ambitious socialist program, organizing unions and consolidating power though his Radical Socialist Party (Partido Socialista Radical). He reestablished the state's teachers’ college and established a system of rural schools. Livestock-raising increased and general economic levels rose. He prohibited the production and sale of alcoholic beverages in the state. An atheist, he persecuted the Catholic Church, destroying various churches including the Tabasco Cathedral. Events relating to this were portrayed in the novel The Power and the Glory by Graham Greene. He organized "cultural assemblies with the aim of persuading people away from religion, sometimes burning images of saints. He even forbade the use of crosses on graves and changed the names of towns and ranches to rid them of religious references. Unlike other parts of the country, there was little resistance against this repression of the church and the success of Garrido's dissuasion left a vacuum, which was later filled by missionaries from Protestant and Evangelical groups." His tenure as governor ended in 1935, when he was appointed the federal Secretary of Agriculture and he appointed Aureo L. Calles to take over. Opponents of Garrido declared this a violation of due process and held their own elections. Supporters of Garrido tried to stop the election, resulting in shooting and twelve dead.

In the 1950s, Carlos A. Madrazo became governor; he promoted large public works, agricultural and industrial projects, and initiated exploration for petroleum. The highway along the Gulf Coast linking eastern Tabasco with Veracruz and the Yucatan Peninsula was completed in 1956. During the same decade, a museum dedicated to the La Venta archeological site was founded by Carlos Pellicer.

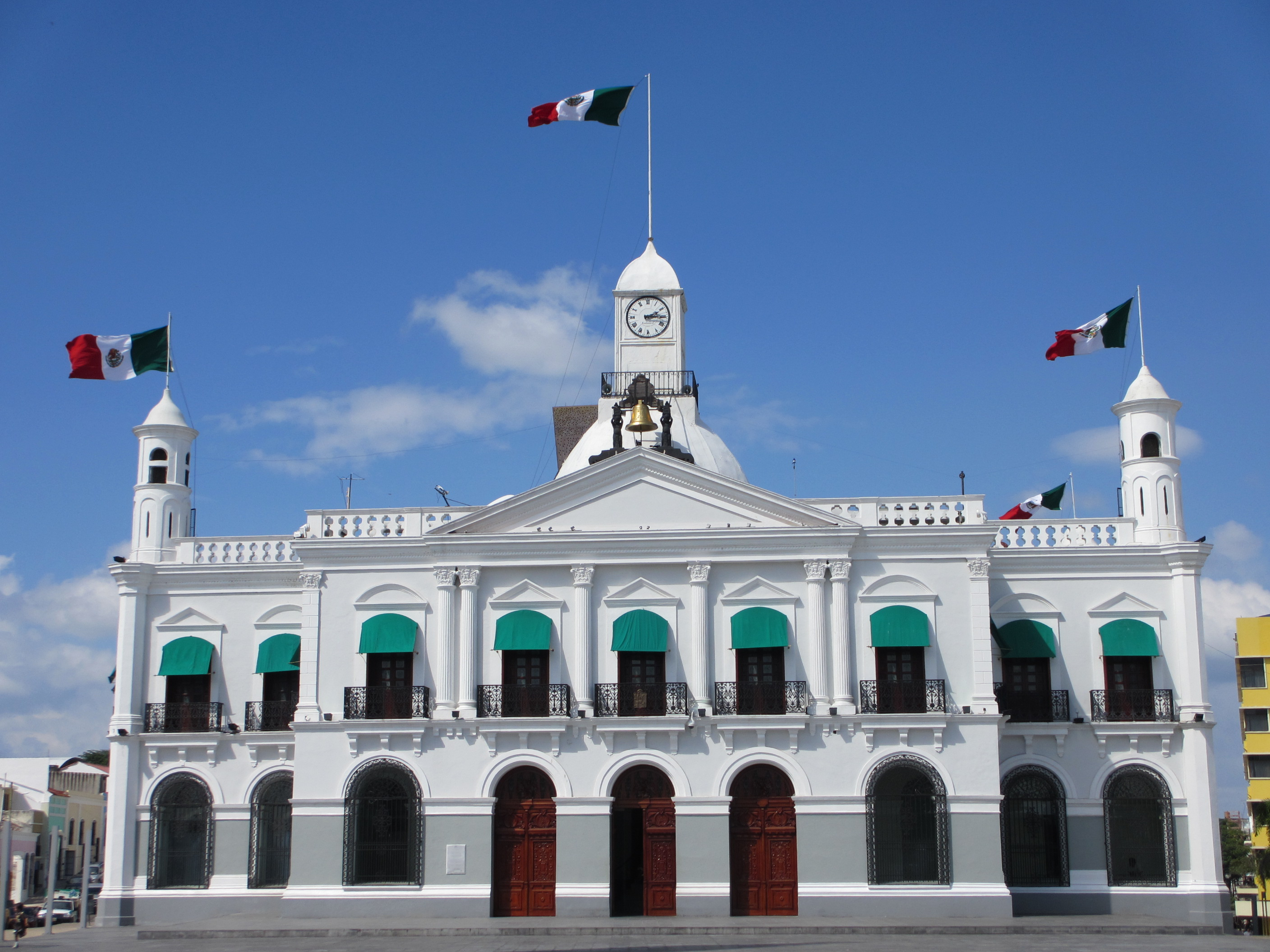
Government Palace of Tabasco in Villahermosa

In the 1960s and 1970s, the educational system was modernized, instituting free breakfasts for students. Infrastructure projects improved or created docks, roads, monuments and sporting facilities mostly in the capital and municipal seats. Agriculture was the focus of programs called Plan Chontalpa and Plan Balacán-Tenosique and free health care clinics were built in rural areas.

Oil and natural gas were discovered at this time and in 1974, the development of these resources began. The petroleum boom produced great wealth, but there have been disputes over the money earned from the facilities owned by PEMEX, the nation's oil company. The industry has put pressure on the state's infrastructure, housing and supplies of basic necessities. New roads, bridges and a modern airport have been constructed with oil money, along with a Centro de Investigaciones de la Cultura Olmeca y Maya, the Teatro del Estado, a planetarium and a convention center in the capital. The PEMEX facilities have caused environmental damage, and damage to local farmers’ crops. There have been issues related to the breaking of environmental laws, but corruption and the lack of legal jurisdiction outside of the federal government, which owns PEMEX, has hampered efforts to sue for enforcement. In 1996, hundreds of blockades of installations were carried out by locals with the active support of the Party of the Democratic Revolution (PRD). The most notable was the blocking of the bridge to the Sen oil field. It was broken up by police but the following month 30,000 marched on Villahermosa to protest. The friction between the populace and the government over oil and other issues led to some political restructuring in the state. This was accompanied with general dissatisfaction with the ruling party, the PRI, nationwide. Reforms to decentralize power away from Villahermosa were undertaken but in the 1990s, political instability remained with farmers, ranchers and others continuing to complain about how PEMEX was affecting their economic activities.

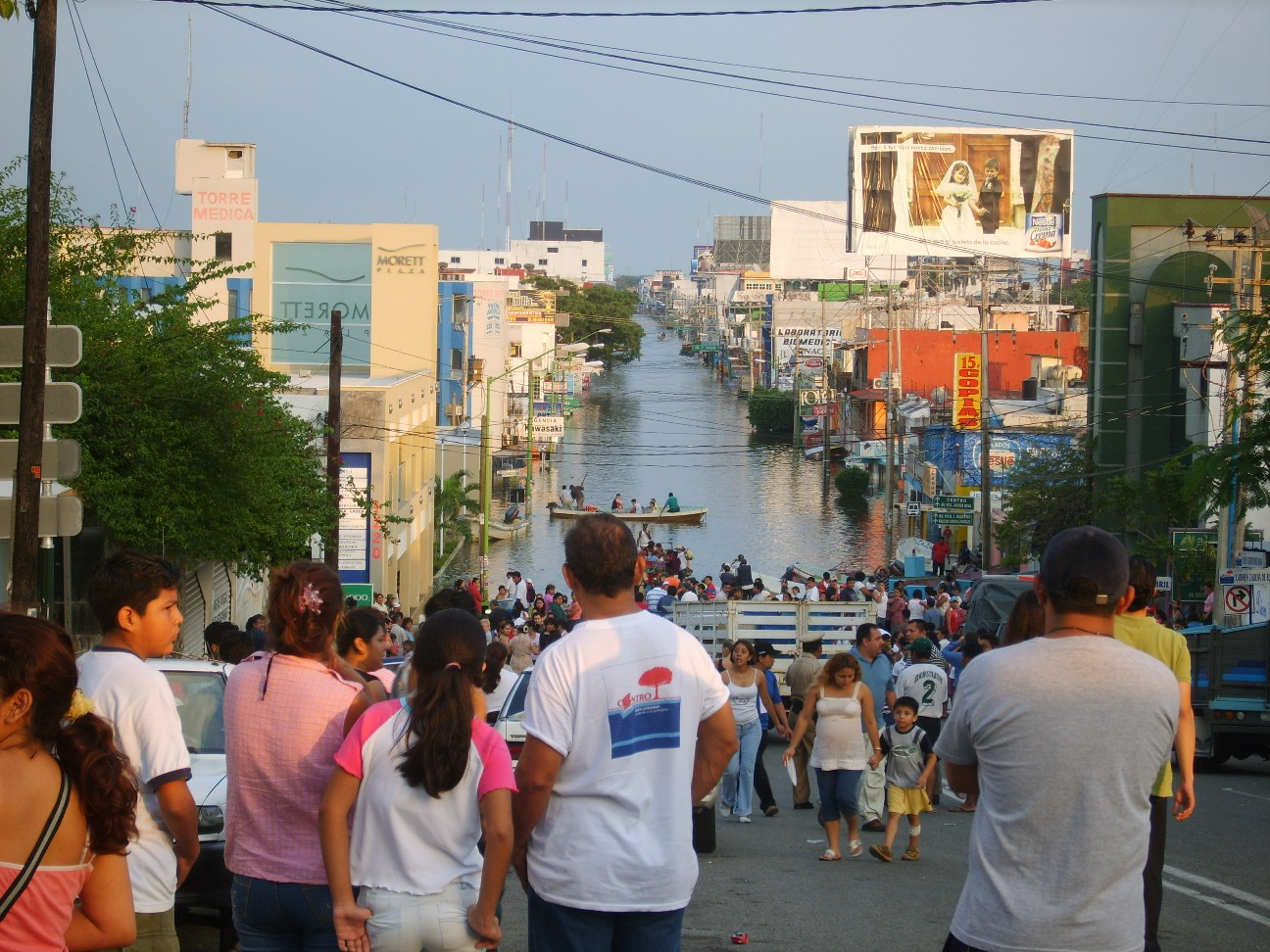
Scene from the 2007 floods

Flooding has historically been an issue in the state, which has year-round heavy rainfall and various rivers flowing through it. Villahermosa was founded on a hill between the Sierra and Grijalva Rivers. The growth of the city from the 1970s on has brought development down from the hill onto the floodplains. Recent major flooding includes events in 1975, 1990 and 1999. The last prompted the creation of the Programa Integral de Control de Inundaciones (Integral Program for Flood Control) to build dams, dikes and other flood control measures. These were in process of construction when the 2007 floods hit. From October 28 to 30, unusually heavy rainfall caused the Grijalva River to rise, overflowing the Peñitas Dam, as well as other area rivers. This eventually covered about eighty percent of the state's territory as deep as 4 meters (13 ft) in places, affecting over a million people. The flood damage was made worse by the presence of human settlements on flood plains and the lack of hydraulic infrastructure on the Sierra and Usumacinta rivers. There was also a lack of warning systems and evacuation plans for those downriver.

In the 1990s, various technical colleges were established in the state along with the Universidad Popular de la Chontalpa and another in Tenosique. Hospitals in various municipalities and various historic centers were reconstructed, especially that of Villahermosa.

== Economy ==
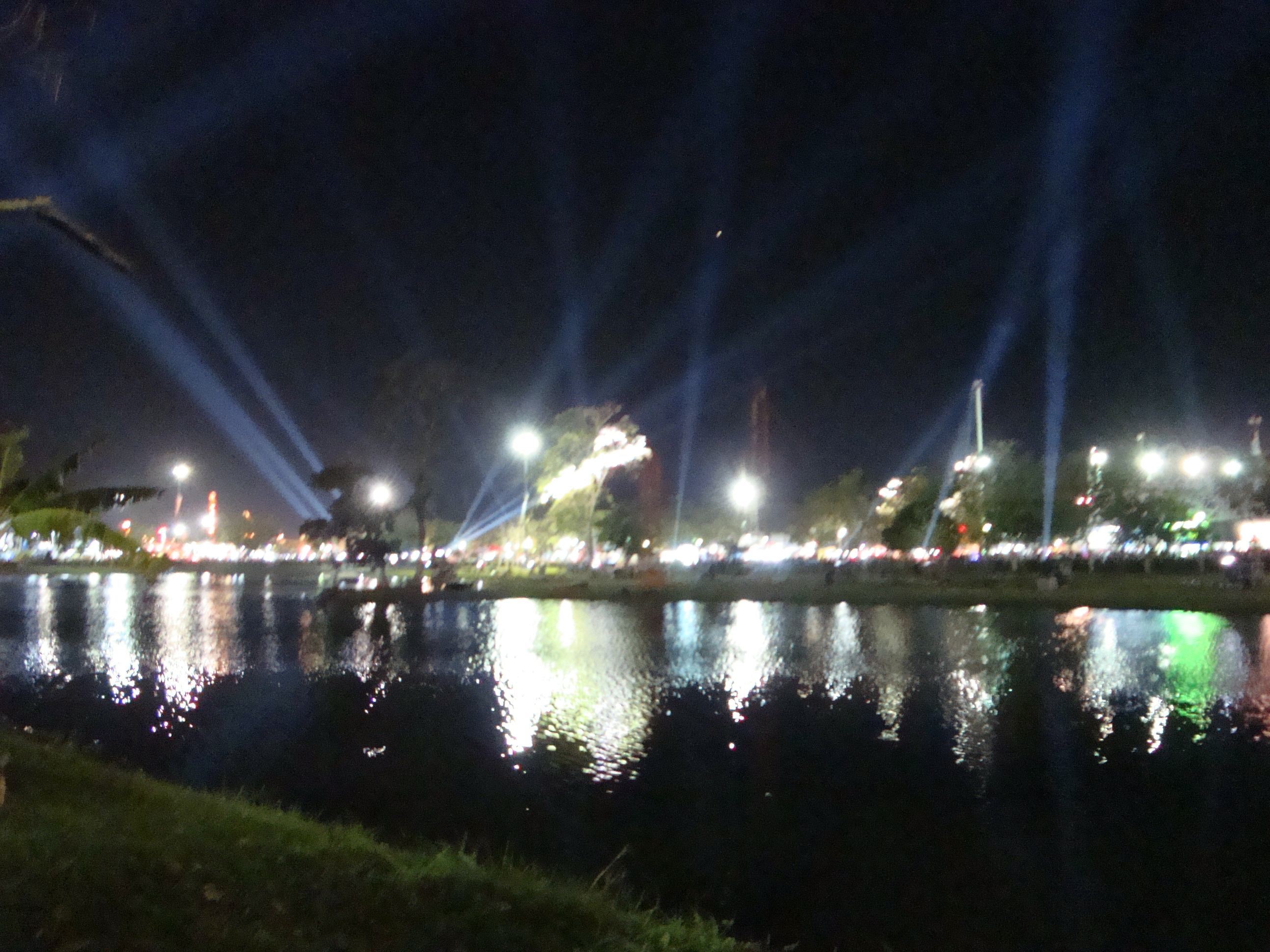
Scene from the Feria Tabasco

The state accounts for 3.4 percent of Mexico's national GDP. Although the recent oil boom has helped to bring the state out of complete poverty, there are still areas in which this is a serious problem. In urban areas running water, sewerage and electricity is available to over ninety percent of the population; however, in rural areas, running water reaches about forty percent, sewerage under seventy percent and electricity under 85 percent. The state has about 150,000 families or about half a million people living in poverty, mostly due to lack of employment according to the Sedesol. Most of the state's poor are concentrated in the Jonuta, Tacotalpa, Centla and Humanguillo municipalities as these lack any major industry.

The heavy rainfall in the state does not lend itself well to annual crops and frequent flooding is a problem as well. Despite this, there is significant production of corn, sorghum and beans. Most of the commercially important crops are perennials, such as cacao, coconut, oranges, bananas and sugar cane. There is also important pasture, both natural and seeded. The state has extensive areas of natural grasslands. Due to the climate, the Zebu breed of cattle does best and is mostly raised for meat. Cattle accounts for about three quarters of the meat produced in the state. Other livestock includes pigs, sheep, goats and domestic fowl. Most livestock is raised in the Villahermosa, Cárdenas and Emiliano Zapata municipalities.

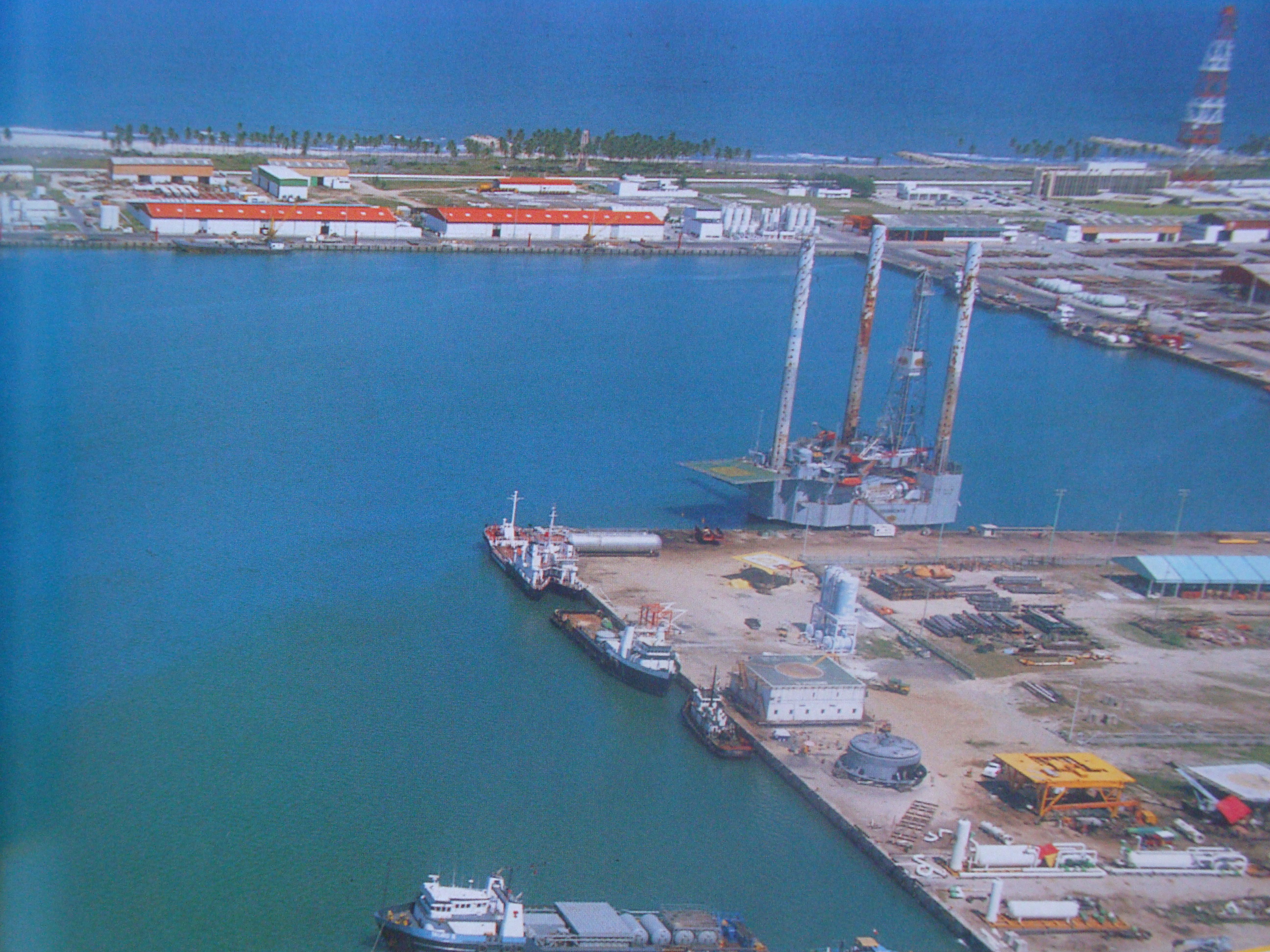
View of the port of Dos Bocas

Tabasco has salt water and fresh water fishing along its shoreline and in the many rivers and small lakes but they are not extensively exploited, providing less than two percent of Mexico's total fish production. Commercial species include oysters, mojarra, shrimp, sea bass, shark, lobster and gar. Most fishing fleets are located in Frontera, with others in Sanchez Magallanes, Chilitepec, and Dos Bocas. The state has natural resources such as mahogany, cedar and other tropical hardwoods.

Mining, mostly of petroleum and natural gas, provides most of the state's GDP. Only 14.6 percent of the working population is in mining. About 19 percent work in construction, transportation and manufacturing. Most manufacturing is food processing, bottling and tobacco products. About ninety percent of industrial establishments are family-owned, mostly dedicated to food processing in and around Villahermosa. The most important industry is petroleum refining, done by PEMEX in the Macuspana municipality. There are 860 wells in various municipalities extracting crude oil and natural gas. It produces 556,371 barrels of crude oil and 1,363,000 cubic feet (38,600 m^{3}) of natural gas per day. It has deposits of gravel and sand, along with the Cementos Apasco factory.

Just over 61 percent of the working population is employed in services and commerce. There are 86 traditional public markets. The Tabasco Fair is the most important commercial event. It has its origins in 1880. It has been held on and off since then in various locations. Today, it is held in Villahermosa at Parque Tabasco 2000 where the various municipalities of the state demonstrate their products. It features cultural and sporting events as well.

== Tourism ==
Tourism in the state is organized into various routes. The Centro or Villahermosa route is centered on the state capital with its museums and historic buildings. These include the cultural center of Villahermosa, the regional anthropology museum, Tomás Garrido Canabal Park, the Yumka’ Ecological Reserve, the Paseo Tabasco Malecon tourist corridor, the Papagayo Interactive Museum and the Tabasco Cathedral.

The Cacao route consists of various cacao haciendas, where guides give lessons on how the plant is cultivated and the cacao bean is harvested, then processed into chocolate. It also includes a visit to the Comalcalco archeological site. The Cacao route focuses on the municipalities of Nacajuca, Jalpa de Méndez, Comalcalco and Paraíso. In Nacajuca, located on the river of the same name, the main attractions are its boardwalk area, handcrafts and surrounding Chontal villages such as Tucta, Mazateupa, Oxiacaque, Tecoluta and Guatacalca, where many customs and the Chontal Maya language are preserved. In Jalpa de Méndez, the main attractions are its gourd handcrafts, the San Remo cigar factory, the La Encantada Turtle Farm and the Pomposú Juliva wetlands on the Mezcalapa River. In Comalcalco, attractions include the Comalcalco archeological site, cacao haciendas such as La Luz with its cacao museum, Jesús María, La Chonita and Cholula. Paraíso is a small port with beaches and some resort facilities.

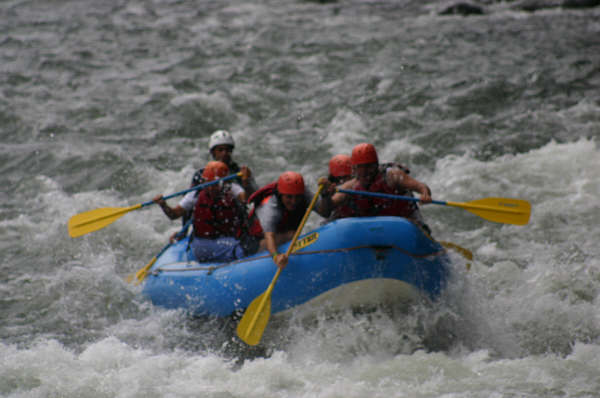
Rafting in Tenosique

The river route is based in the interior portion of the state, between the Grijalva and Usumacinta Rivers. This is an ecotourism route with activities such as canopy climbing, rafting and rappelling. There is also an option to visit the Ponomá archeological site. It includes the Cascadas de Reforma ecological reserve, the Reforma Mayan archeological site, the Dr. José Gómez Pánaco museum, El Popalillo Lake and the Ribera de Acallán lookout point.

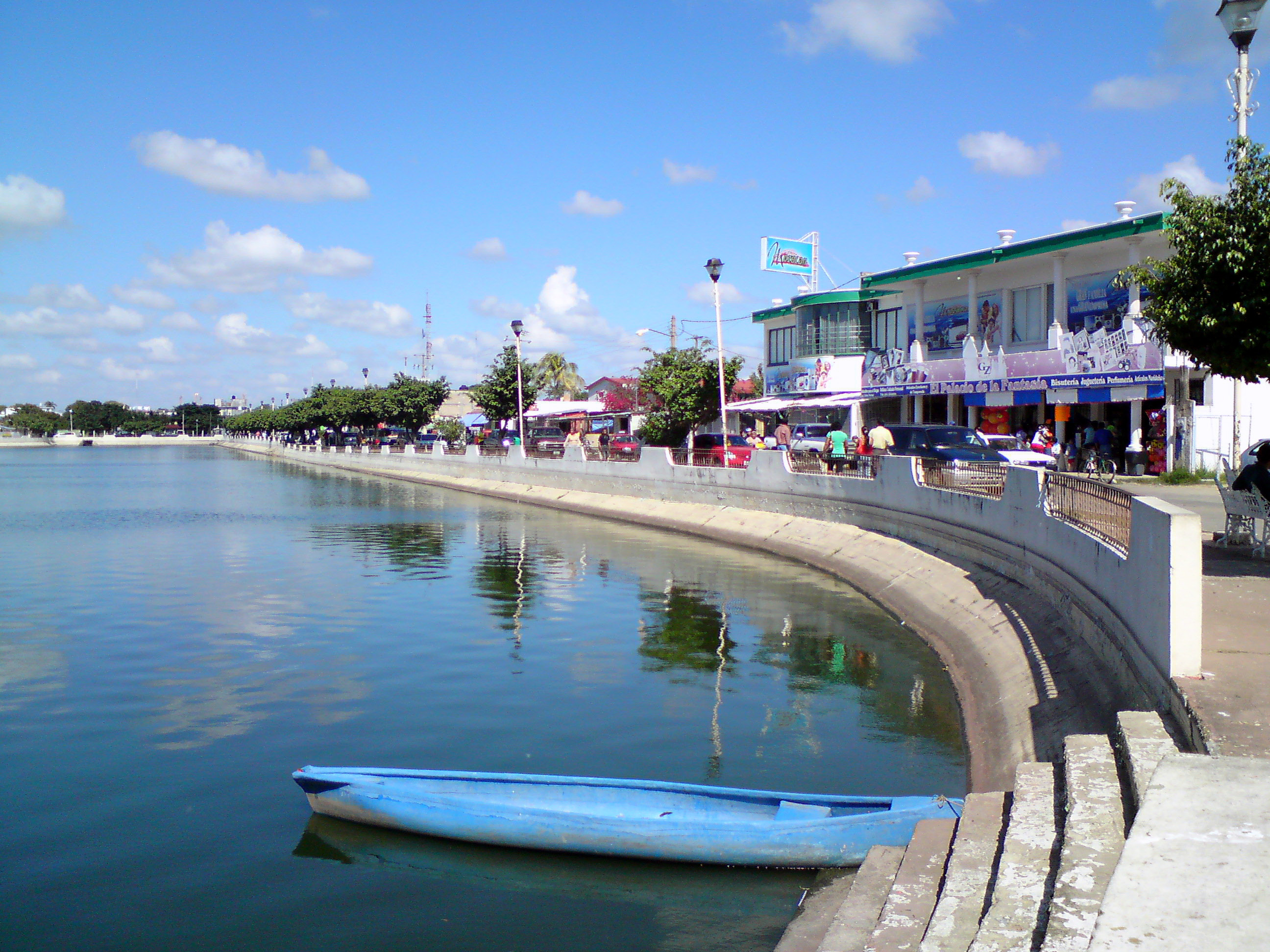
Lago Popalillo

The wetlands route emphasizes flora and fauna both on land and on the water. The main attraction is the Centla biosphere reserve. The reserve is home to a wide variety of wildlife species such as herons, storks, ibis, crocodiles, fresh water turtles, manatees and more. There are also over 500 species of plants with some of the most important concentration of aquatic plants in Mesoamerica. Other attractions include the Centla maritime port, the Museum of Navigation, the town of Frontera (where the Spanish founded the first European settlement on mainland America) and the Punta Manglar ecotourism facility. Beaches in the area include Pico de Oro, Playa Azul, Miramar and El Bosque.

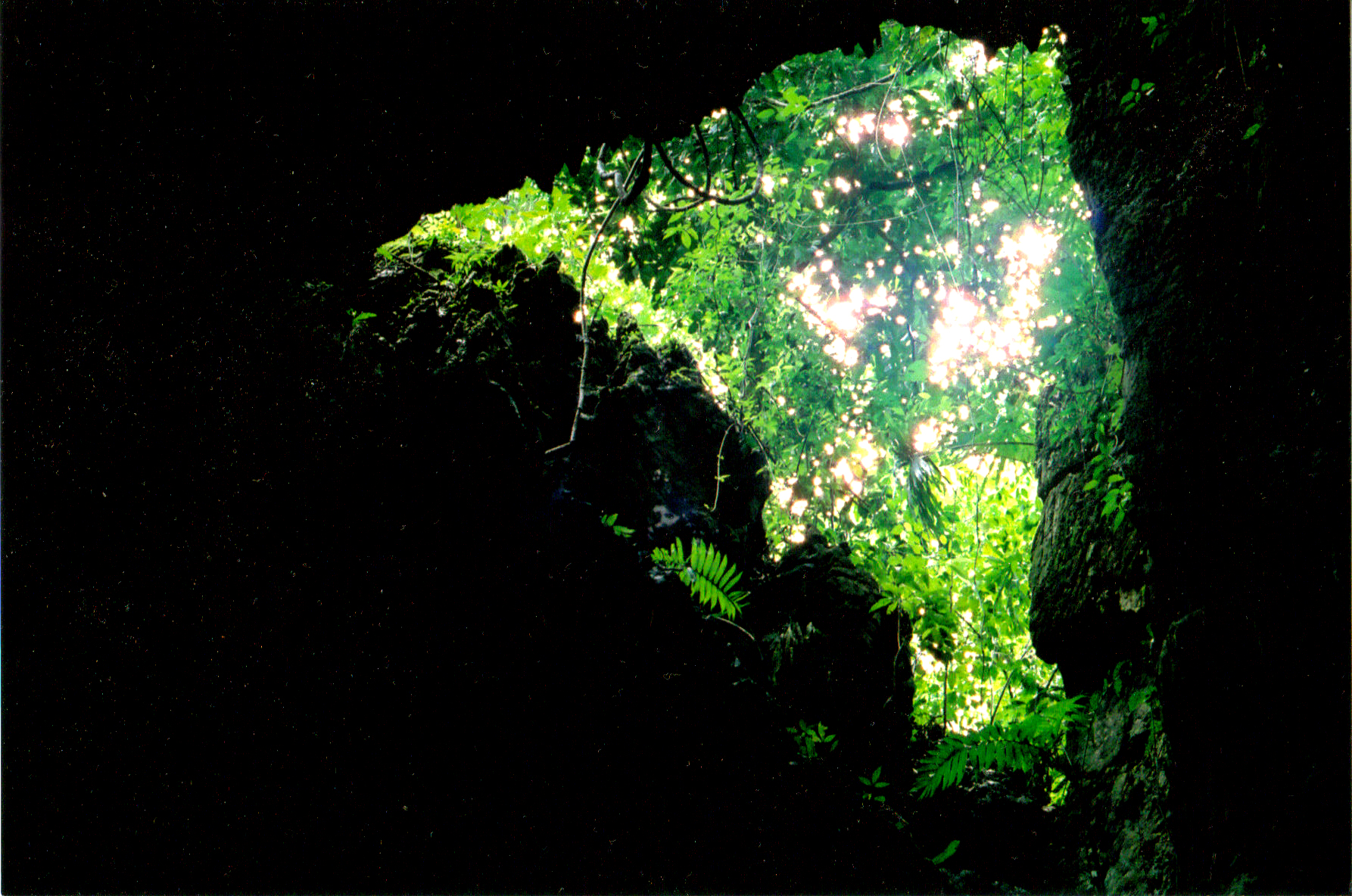
Opening of the Coconá Caverns

The mountain adventure route is in the highlands of the state with its forests, sulphurate waters and caves, centered on the town of Tapijulapa, which is noted for its handcrafts of wood and wicker. It features hills, rainforest, sulfur springs and caves in the Teapa, Tacotalpa and Macuspana municipalities. Sites include the Río Puyacateno park, Los Azufres hacienda and spa, the José Natividad Correa Tosca museum and Coconá Caverns. Ecotourism activities include spelunking, rappelling and hiking.

The Olmec Zoque route encompasses the municipalities of Cardenas and Huimanguillo. Cardenas is near the ocean with various attractions. One is the fishing village of Villa Sánchez Magallenes. Huimanguillo has archeological sites and a number of natural attractions. The best known is La Venta, an Olmec site, but another important one is Malpasito, which belongs to the Zoque culture. In addition, there are areas of tropical rainforest, waterfalls, petroglyphs and lakes.

The Biji Yokot’an route centers on the municipality of Nacajuca. It features the crafts of the area such as decorated containers made from gourds, its cuisine, especially river fish, the Chontal people of the area and the river boardwalk.

Ecological and adventure tourism in Tabasco

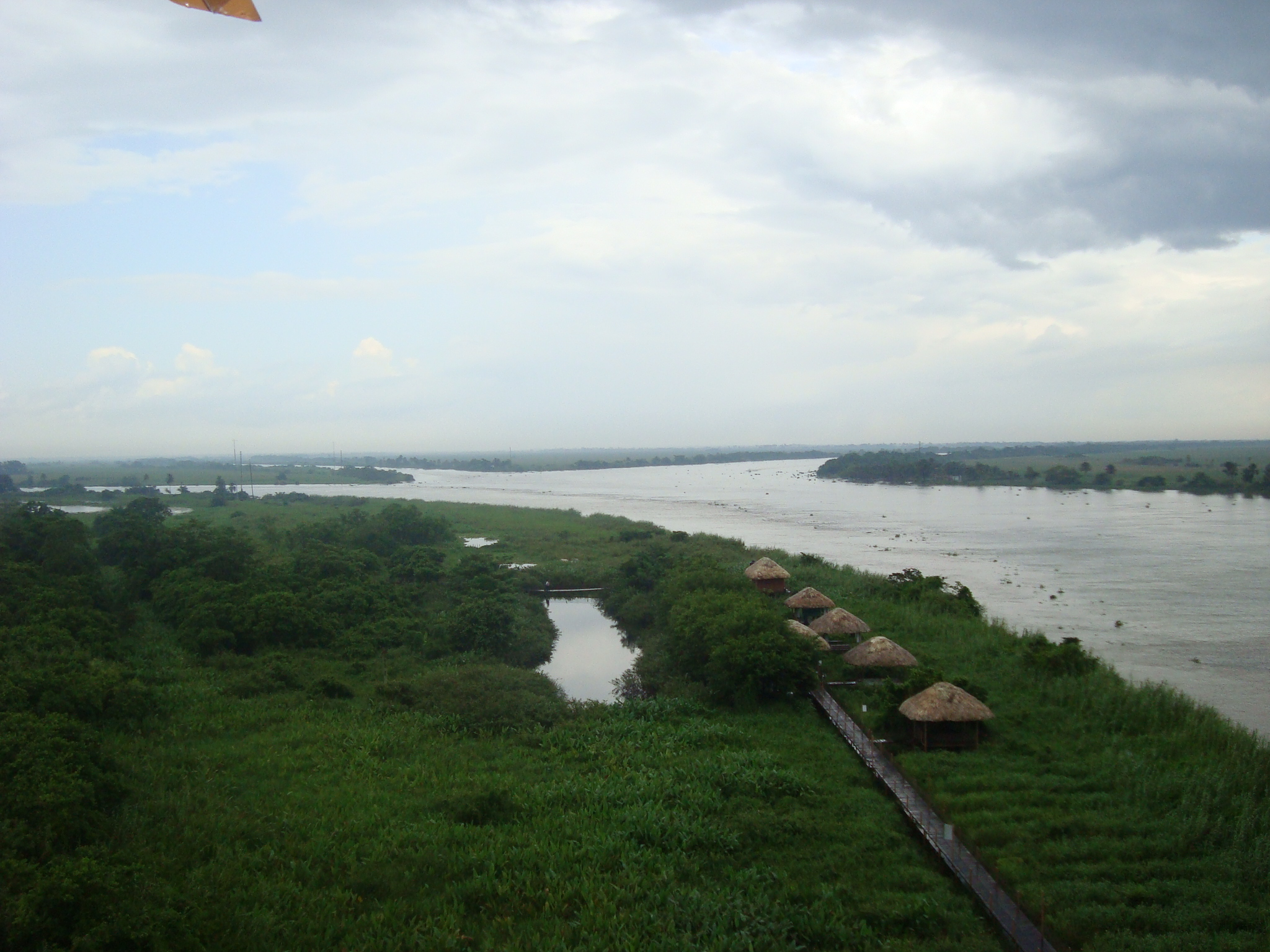
Pantanos de Centla

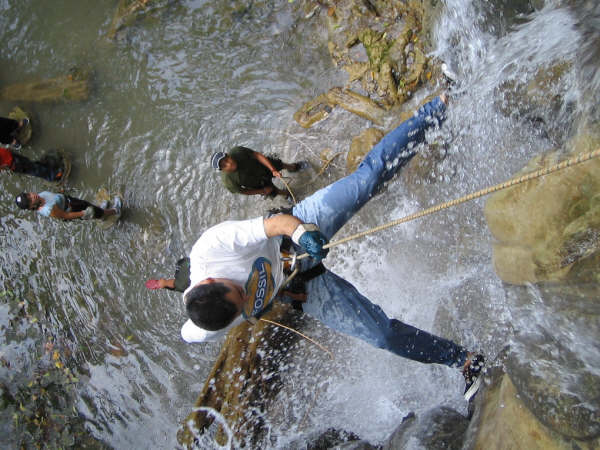
Desarrollo Ecoturístico "Kolem-Jaa"

Cascadas de Aguas Blancas

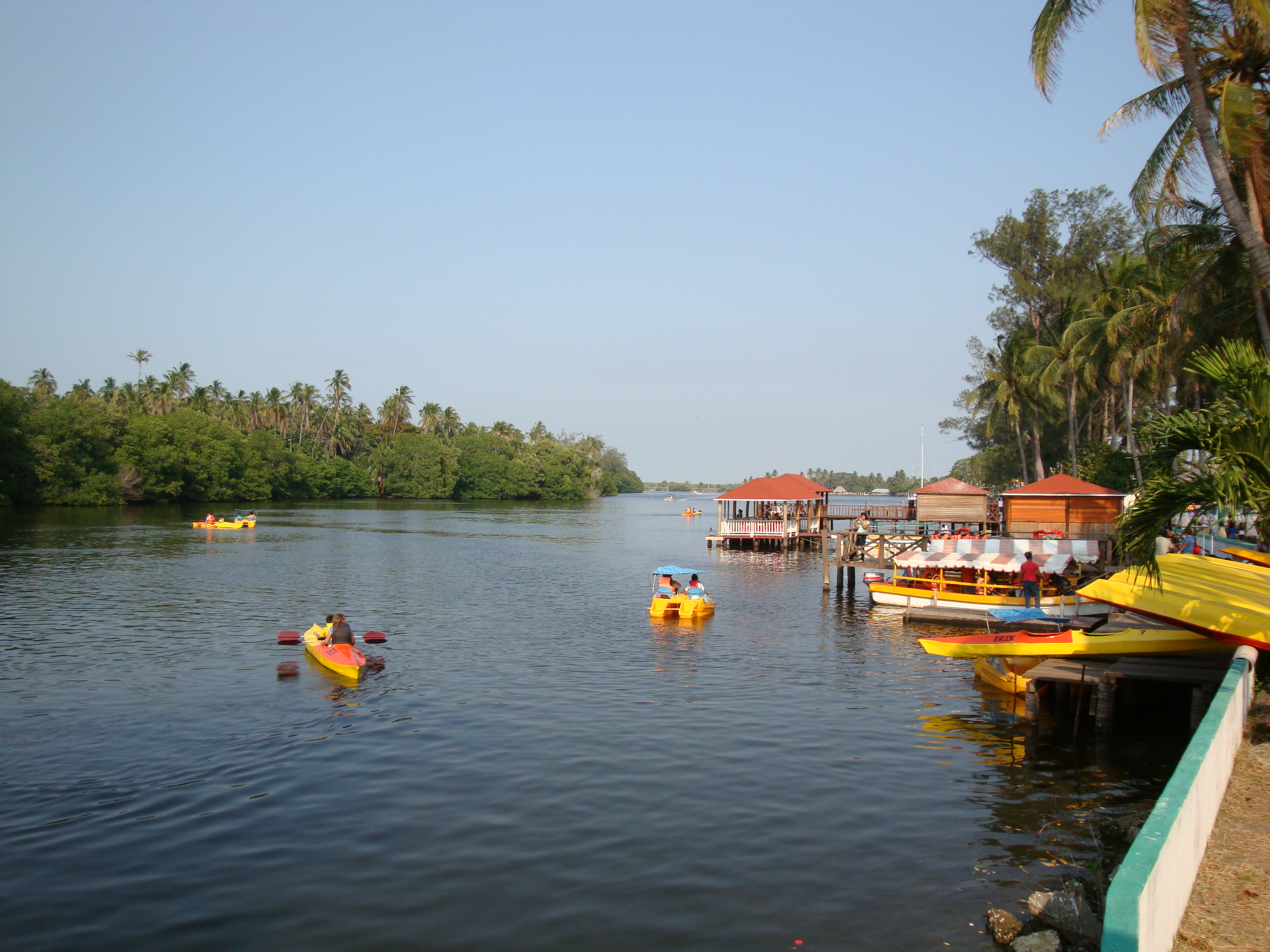
Puerto Ceiba

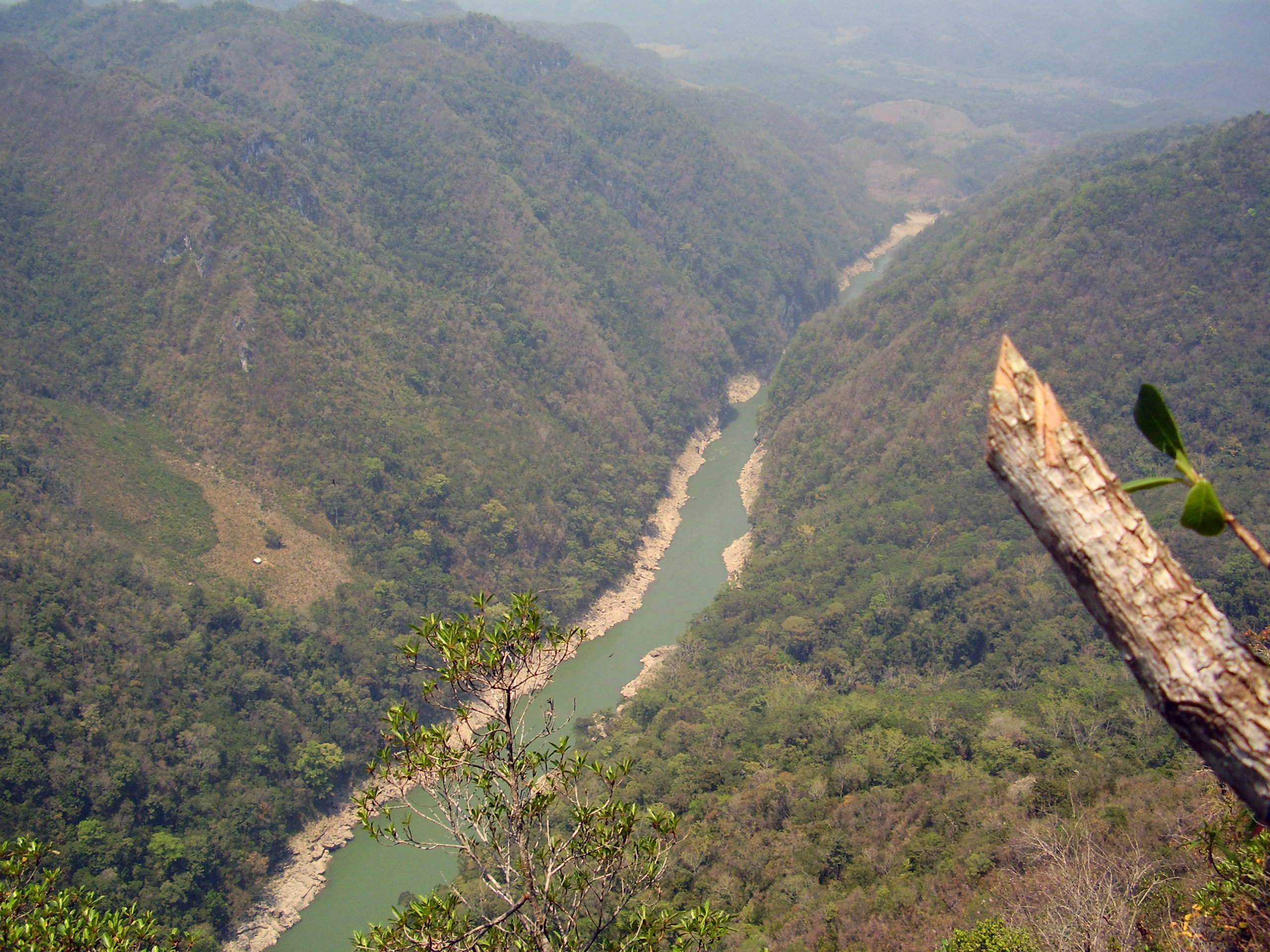
Cañón del Usumacinta

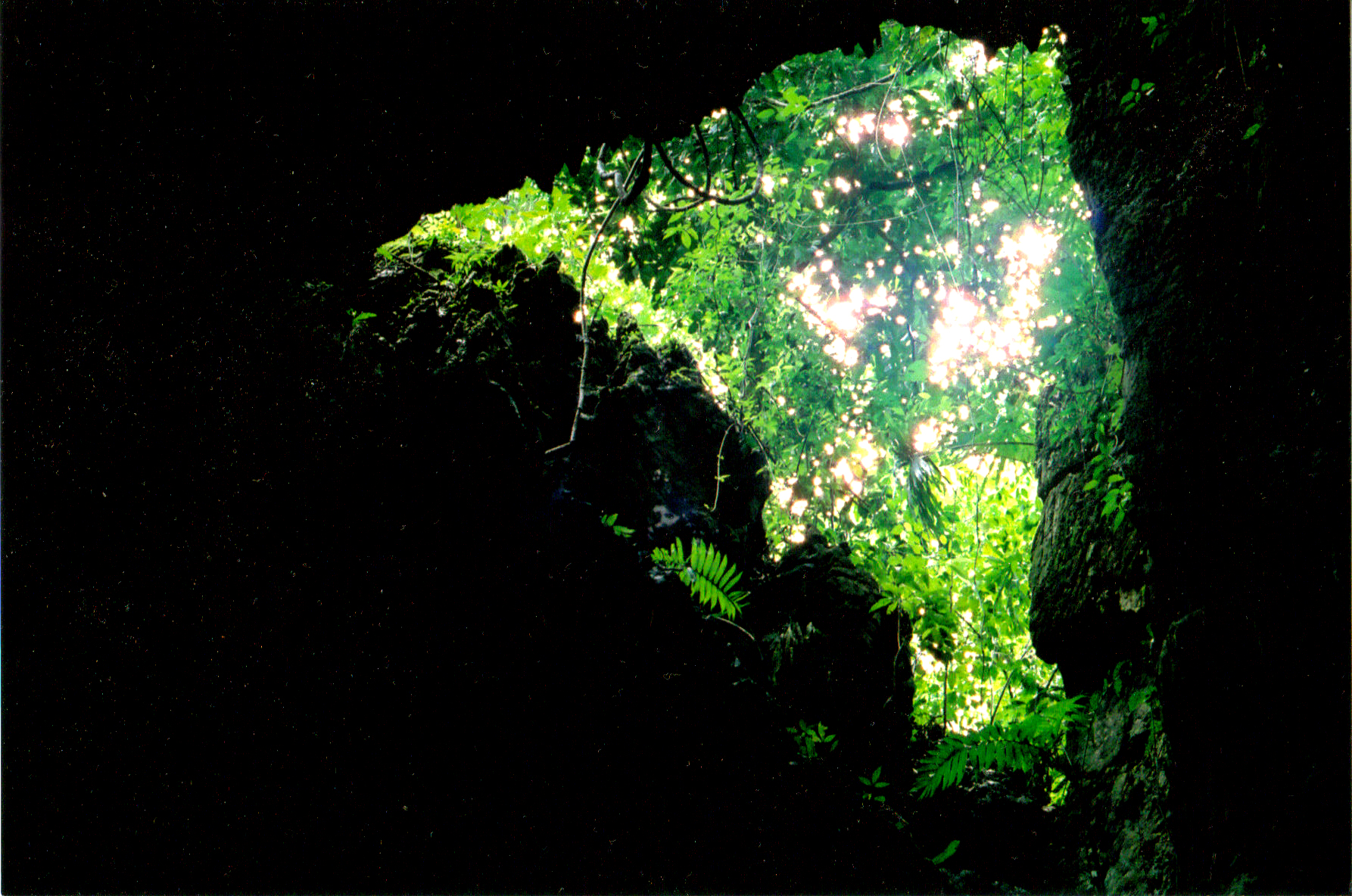
Grutas del Coconá

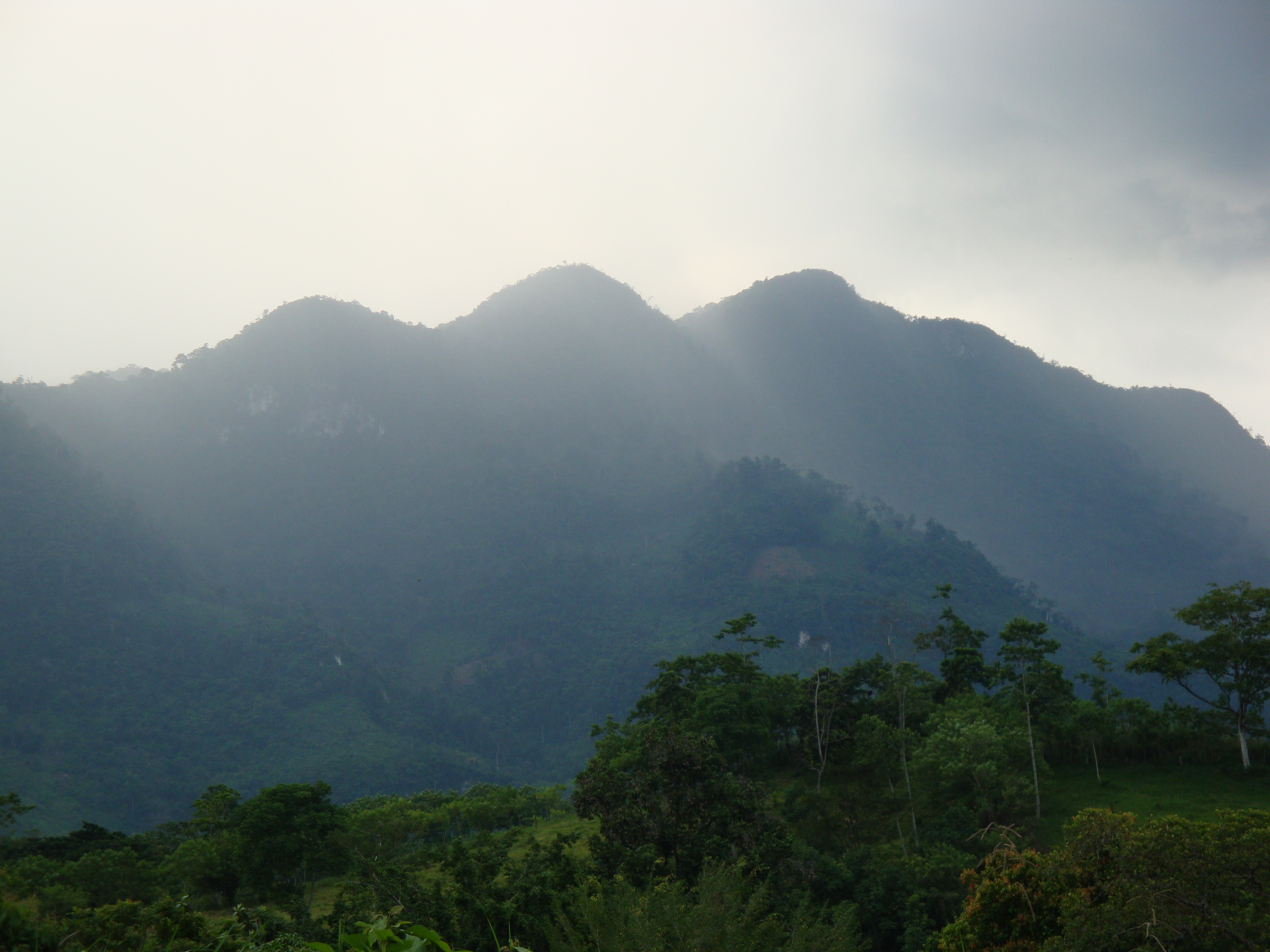
Sierra de Tabasco

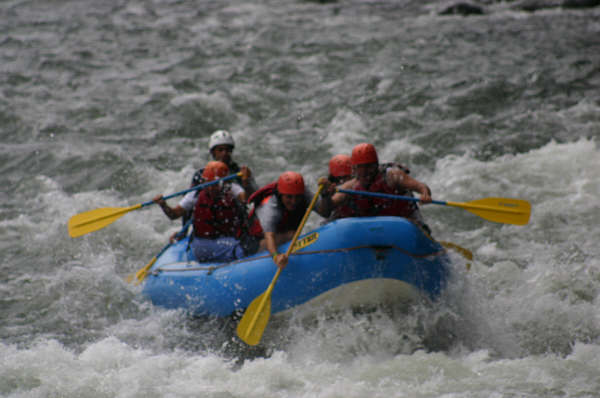
Rápidos de San José-Desempeño

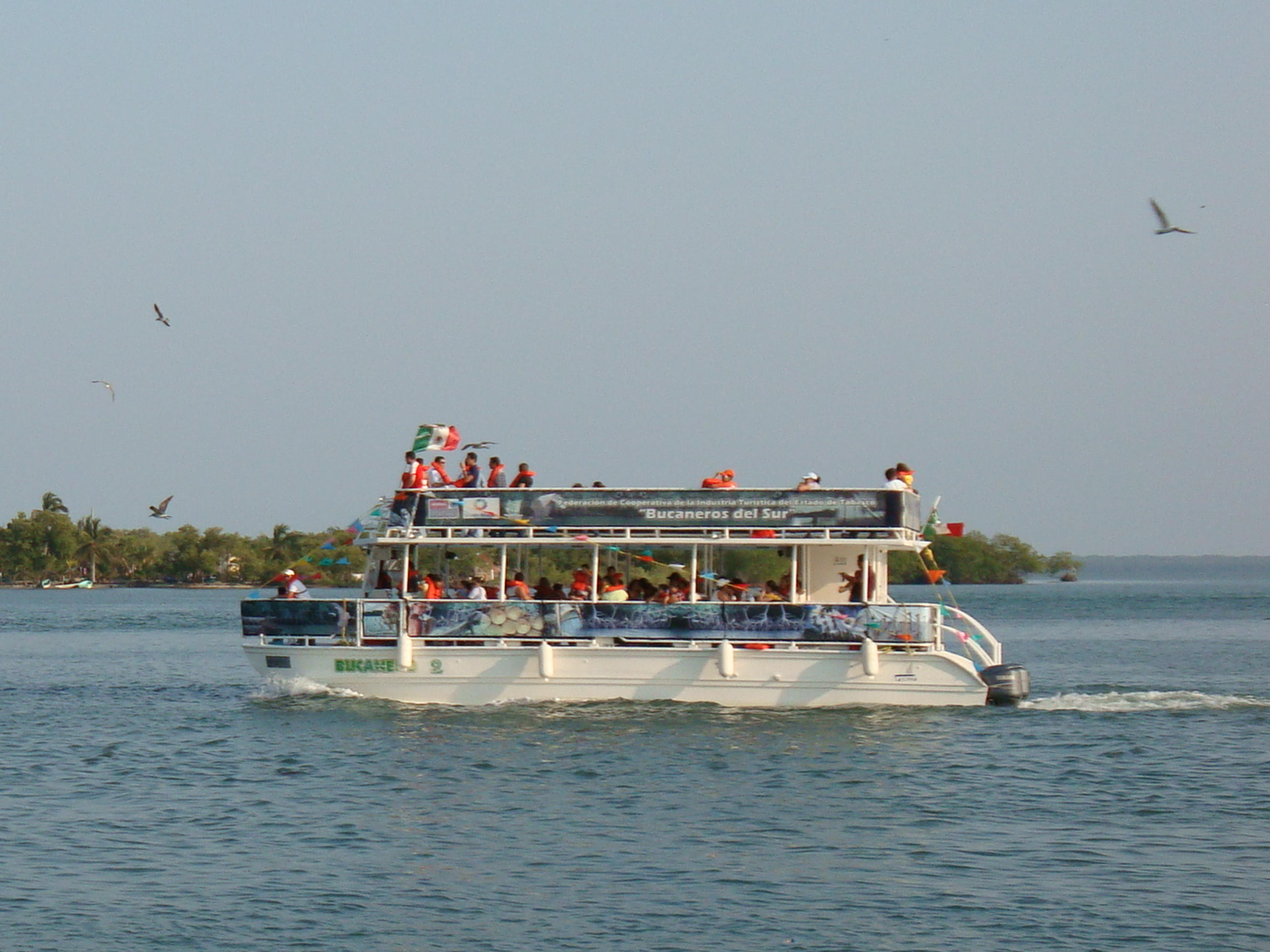
El Bellote

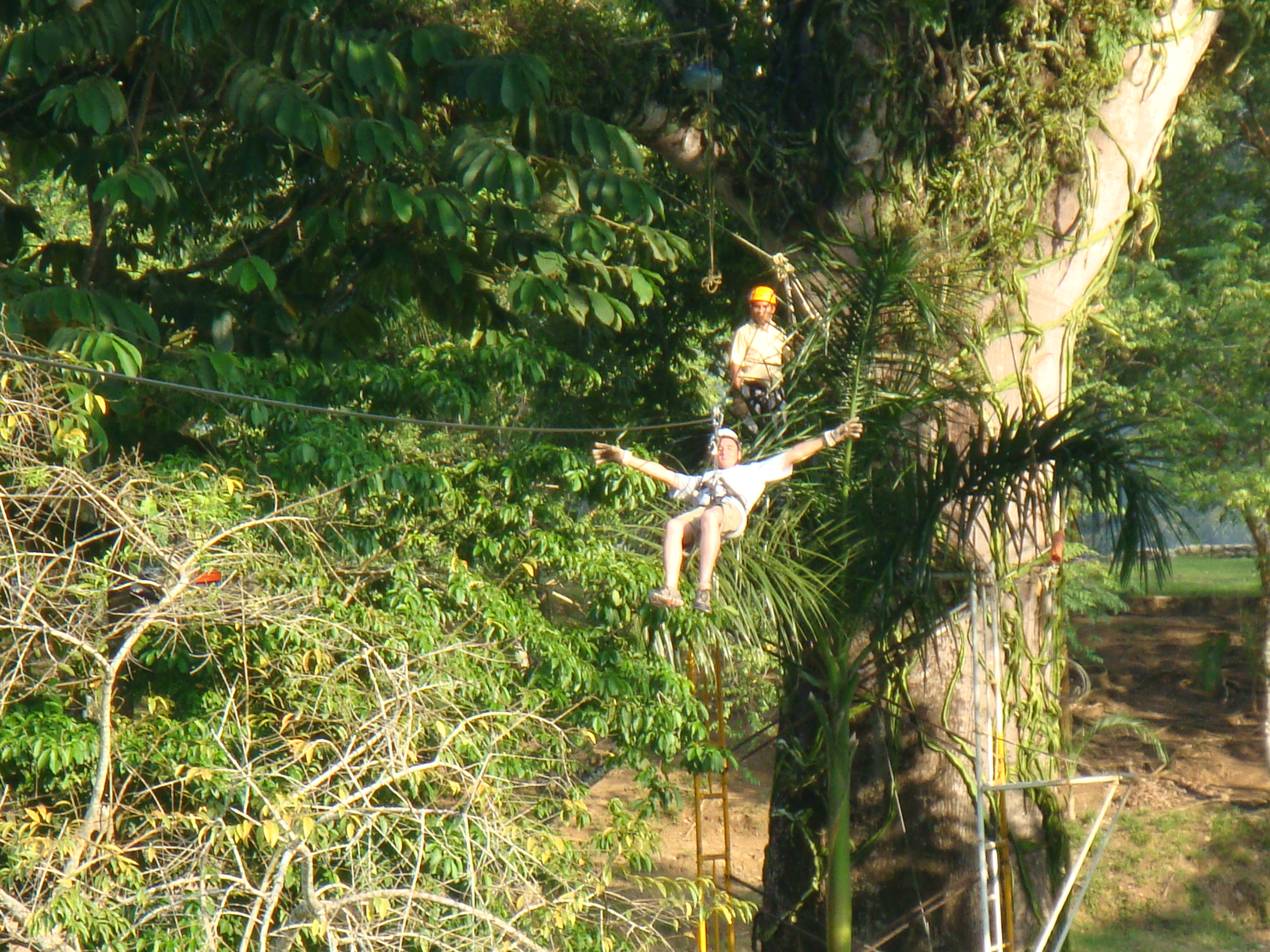
Tapijulapa

== Demographics ==
Largest cities or towns in Tabasco Source:
Rank		Municipality	Pop.
1	Villahermosa	Centro	340,060
2	Cárdenas	Cárdenas	80,454
3	Comalcalco	Comalcalco	43,035
4	Tenosique de Pino Suárez	Tenosique	34,946
5	Macuspana	Macuspana	31,435
6	Santiago de Teapa	Teapa	29,068
7	Huimanguillo	Huimanguillo	27,182
8	Paraíso	Paraíso	25,555
9	Frontera	Centla	23,024
10	Villa Playas del Rosario	Centro	22,934

Historical population
Year	Pop.	±%
1895	134,956	—
1900	159,834	+18.4%
1910	187,574	+17.4%
1921	210,437	+12.2%
1930	224,023	+6.5%
1940	285,630	+27.5%
1950	362,716	+27.0%
1960	496,340	+36.8%
1970	768,327	+54.8%
1980	1,062,961	+38.3%
1990	1,501,744	+41.3%
1995	1,748,769	+16.4%
2000	1,891,829	+8.2%
2005	1,989,969	+5.2%
2010	2,238,603	+12.5%
2015	2,395,272	+7.0%
2020	2,402,598	+0.3%

Tabasco's population has been growing rapidly: between 1990 and 2005 the population grew from 1,501,744 to 1,989,969. Tabasco's population is mostly young, with an average age of 19 years and over 38 percent of the population is under 15 years of age.

The state's population is more rural than the national average: 57 percent live in urban areas, in contrast to 78 percent of Mexico's population in general. Those who leave the state mostly go to Quintana Roo, Campeche and Veracruz. Those that migrate to the state mostly come from Chiapas, Veracruz and Campeche. As of the 2000s, only about 2 percent of the population has left to live abroad, mostly to the United States. The national average is 16 percent. Three percent of the population speaks an indigenous language, which is lower than the national average of 6 percent. Most speak the Tabascan dialect of the Chontal Maya language. This is followed by Ch'ol, Tzeltal, Maya, Zapotec languages, Nahuatl and Tzotzil.

According to the 2020 Census, 1.56 percent of Tabasco's population identified as Black, Afro-Mexican, or of African descent.

== Culture ==
Traditional masculine dress consists of a white shirt and pants, with black boots or shoes, black belt, a hat in a style called "chontal" and a red handkerchief around the neck. This dress is based on an older type of clothing called traje choco, made of cotton cloth called manta, used to work in the fields.

The traditional female dress consists of a wide skirt trimmed with a ruffle. Under the skirt is a slip designed to fluff the skirt and make the waist look smaller. The blouse is white with an embroidered band in bright colors, often with flower and/or animal designs. It has short sleeves ending in a square form in the lower part. The woman often carried a small handkerchief and a shawl called a rebozo in bright colors, often complementing the skirt. The shoes are black.

Traditional dress of Tabasco

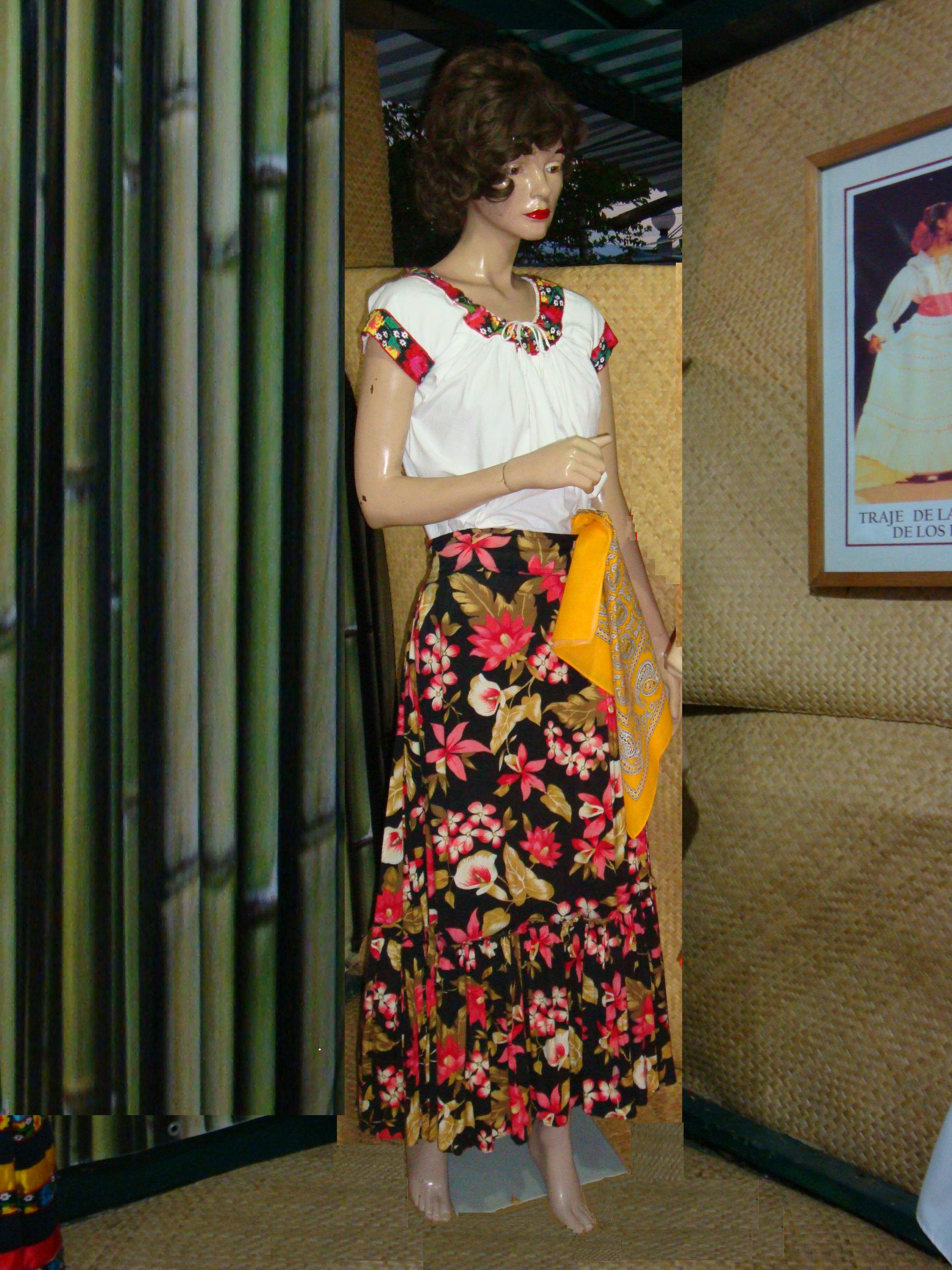
Regional everyday dress

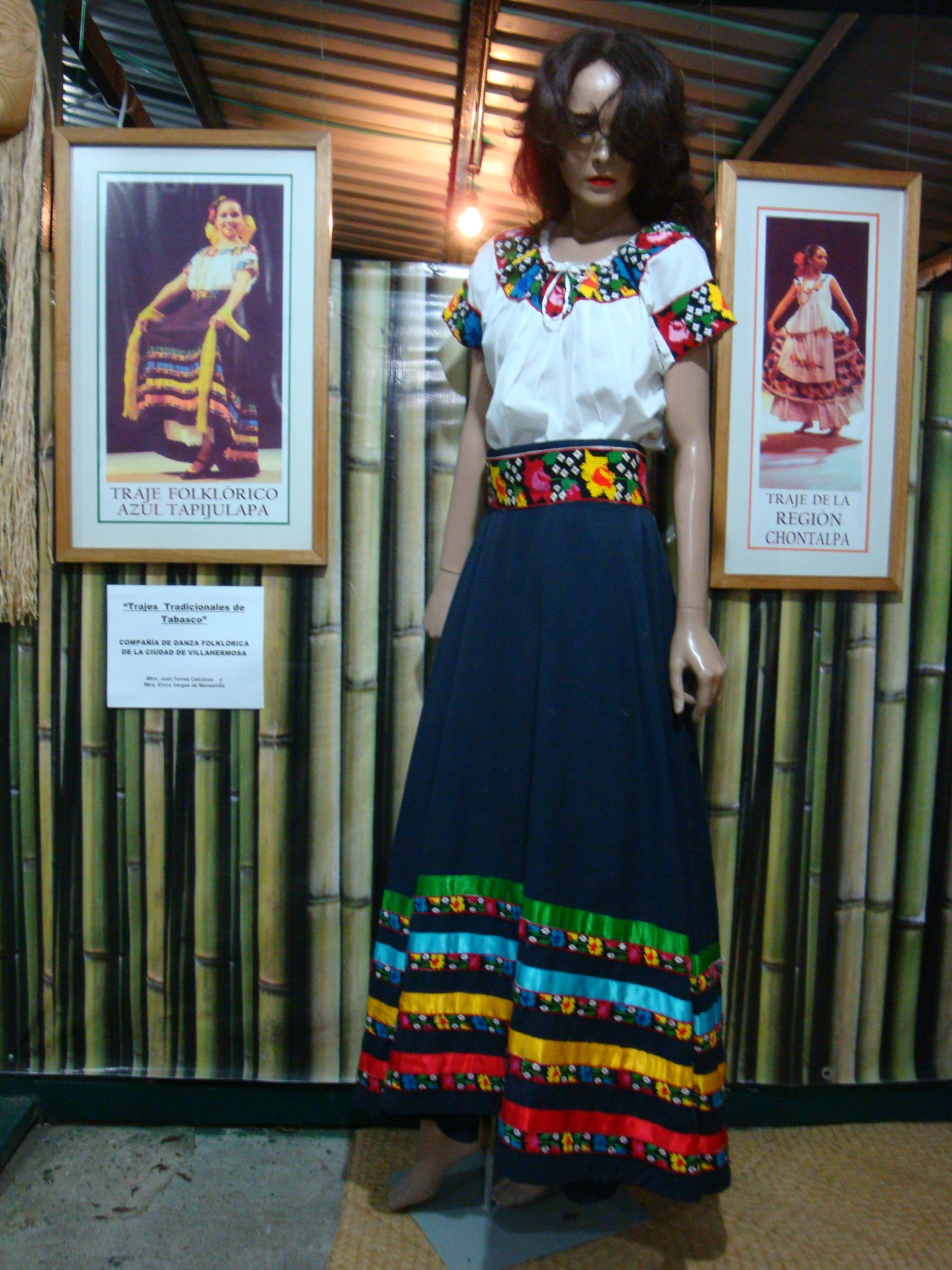
Regional semi-formal dress

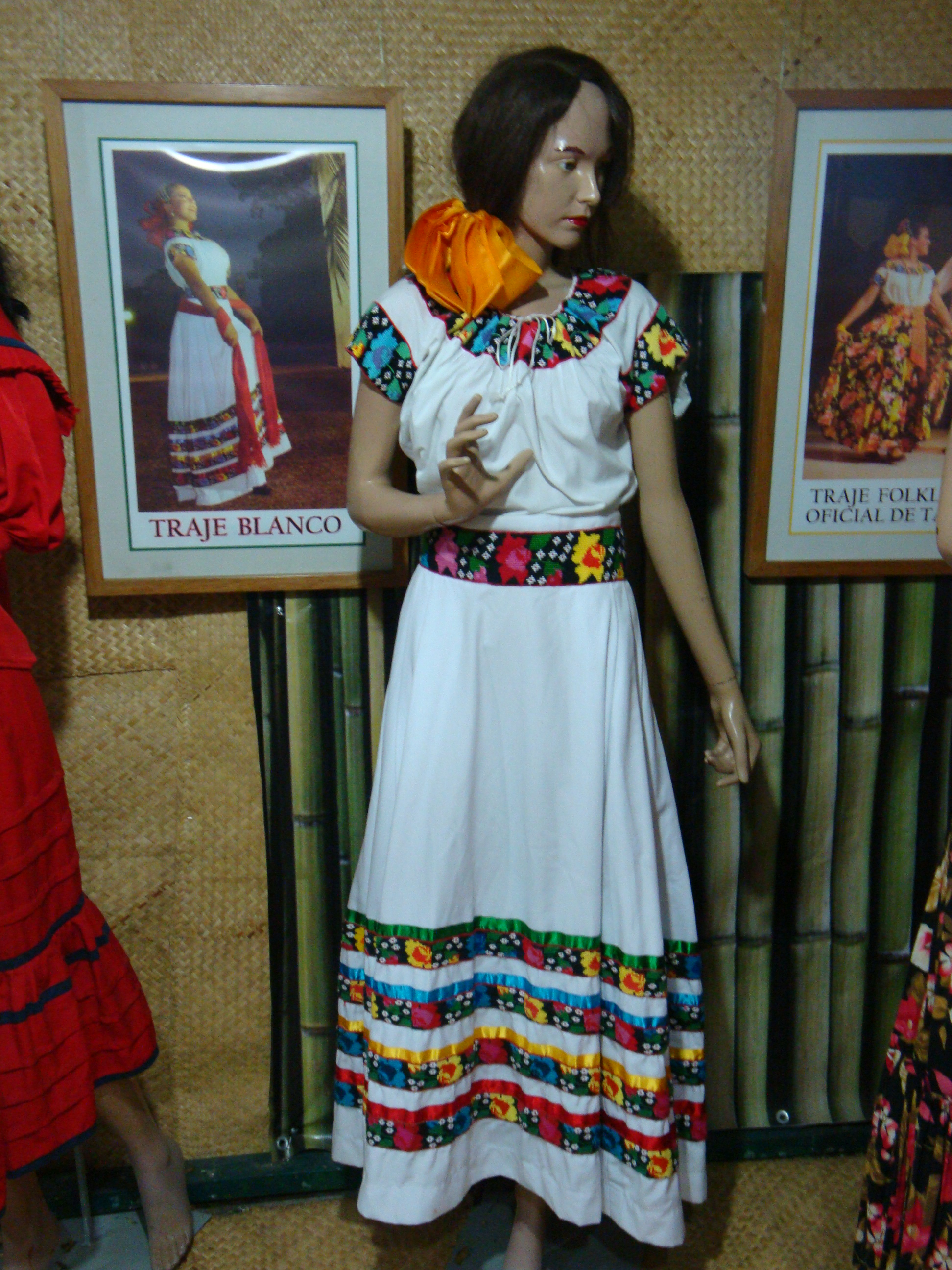
Regional formal dress

The state has a number of unique traditional dances due to its relative isolation from the rest of the country. These include "El Gigante" of Nacajuca, performed on August 14. "Baila Viejo" is performed in Tucta and Guaytalpa in the municipality of Nacajuca as well as the Atasta de Serra in Villahermosa. "El Pochó" is of pre Hispanic origin and is performed during Carnival in Tenosique. "Los Blanquitos" is also performed in Tenosique and symbolizes the struggle of black slaves during the colonial period. "El Caballito Blanco" depicts the struggles of the indigenous against the Spanish at the Battle of Centla. Zapateo is said to be derived from the fandango, brought to the area by a conquistador called Ortíz de Séquito. It is considered to be the regional dance of the state.

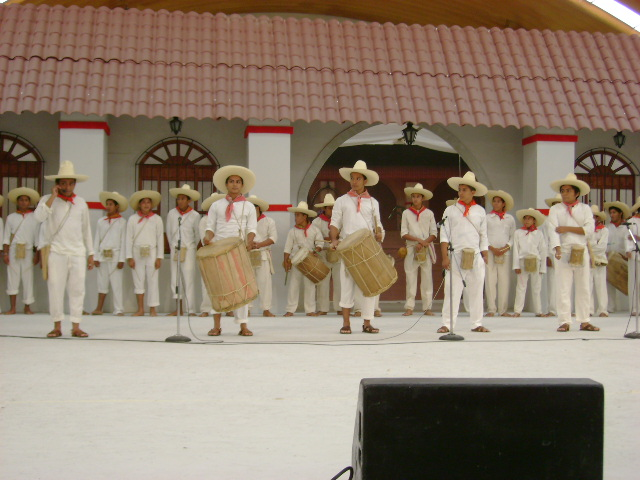
Tamborileros de Tabasco is the traditional music of Tabasco

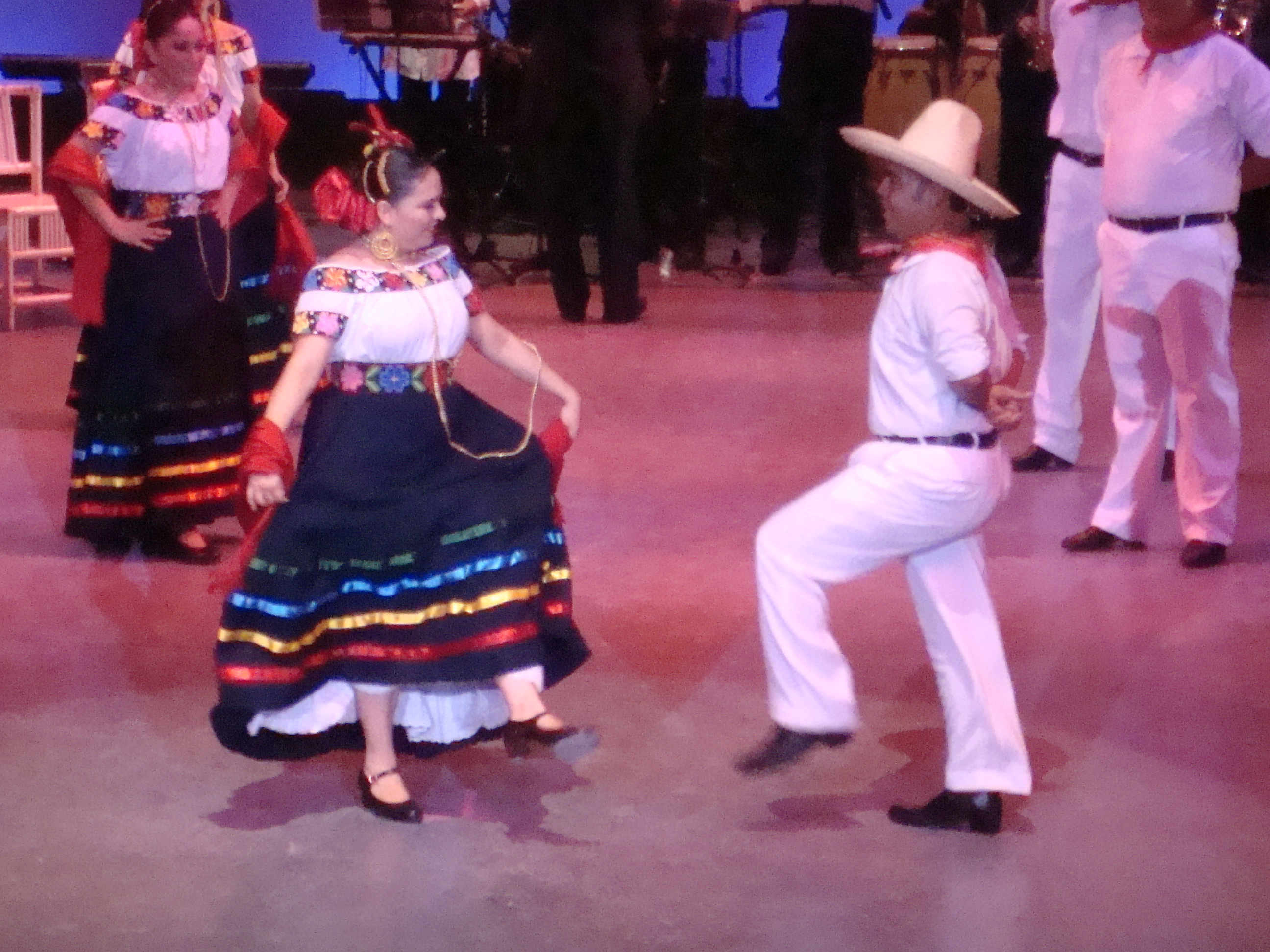
Zapateo, the traditional dance of Tabasco

Traditional music has its origins in the Olmec period with other indigenous influences such as those of the Maya, Mexicas and Nahuas. It is based on flute and percussion, including drums made of tortoise shells and flutes/whistles made of ceramic. Purely indigenous music has almost entirely disappeared, replaced by that of European influence. Fandango influence was the first to arrive, which was modified then called fandanguillo leading to songs called zapateos in the colonial period, played by small orchestras. These were mostly composed of wind instruments but the marimba and drums called temborileros were added. This music was accompanied by a dance of the same name. Later, short improvised rhymes called "bombas" were added varying by region often consisting of a man and woman answering each other.

The cuisine is based on the foods of the ancient Mayas and Chontals, using plants and animals native to the region such as achiote, chili peppers, chipilín (amashito) and banana leaves, with corn and beans serving as the base. (amashito) Traditionally, people in Tabasco eat seven times a day, these meals are called "puntal" (after getting out of bed), breakfast, "refigerio," "apertivo," "comida," "merienda" and "cena." This regime is based on rural work customs which required starting the day before the sun rose. Typical dishes include those with iguana meat, gar fish, beef puchero, smoked oysters, totopostes, pork with beans and tortillas made with banana and fresh corn. Chocolate is still found in preparations which have not changed since pre Hispanic times mostly as hot and cold beverages. The most common cold chocolate beverage is pozol, served fresh or fermented. Each of the regions has certain specialties. Teapa is known for its cheese and longaniza sausage. Jalpa de Méndez produces head cheese, longaniza sausage and another cured meat called butifarra. Macuspana's dishes are often based on ingredients from the area's rivers such as bass, turtle and gar. Paraíso is known for its oysters, often cooked in their shell over an open flame. Jalapa is known for its sweets such as sweetened fruits in corn husks, often accompanied by a cacao and corn beverage called chorote.

Tabasco is host to the boating marathon called the Mundo Maya on the Usumacinta and Grijalva rivers.

The state has sixteen important museums. Most are located in the Villahermosa area but others can be found in Comalcalco, Huimanguillo, Balancán, Emiliano Zapata, Jalpa de Méndez, Jonuta and Teapa. These include the Carlos Pellicer Museum (anthropology) Museum of Popular Culture, Museum of History and the La Venta site museum.

Patron saint days are still popular events in the state, with some of the more notable being San Isidro in Comalcalco and Nacajuca, James the Greater in Chontalpa, Our Lady of the Remedies in Nacajuca, Our Lady of the Assumption in Cupilco, Francis of Assisi in Tamulté de las Sabanas, events related with Lent in Atasta and Tamulté and the Saint Sebastian in Tenosique. There are also notable Carnival celebrations in Pochó, Tenosique and Villahermosa.

== Archaeology ==
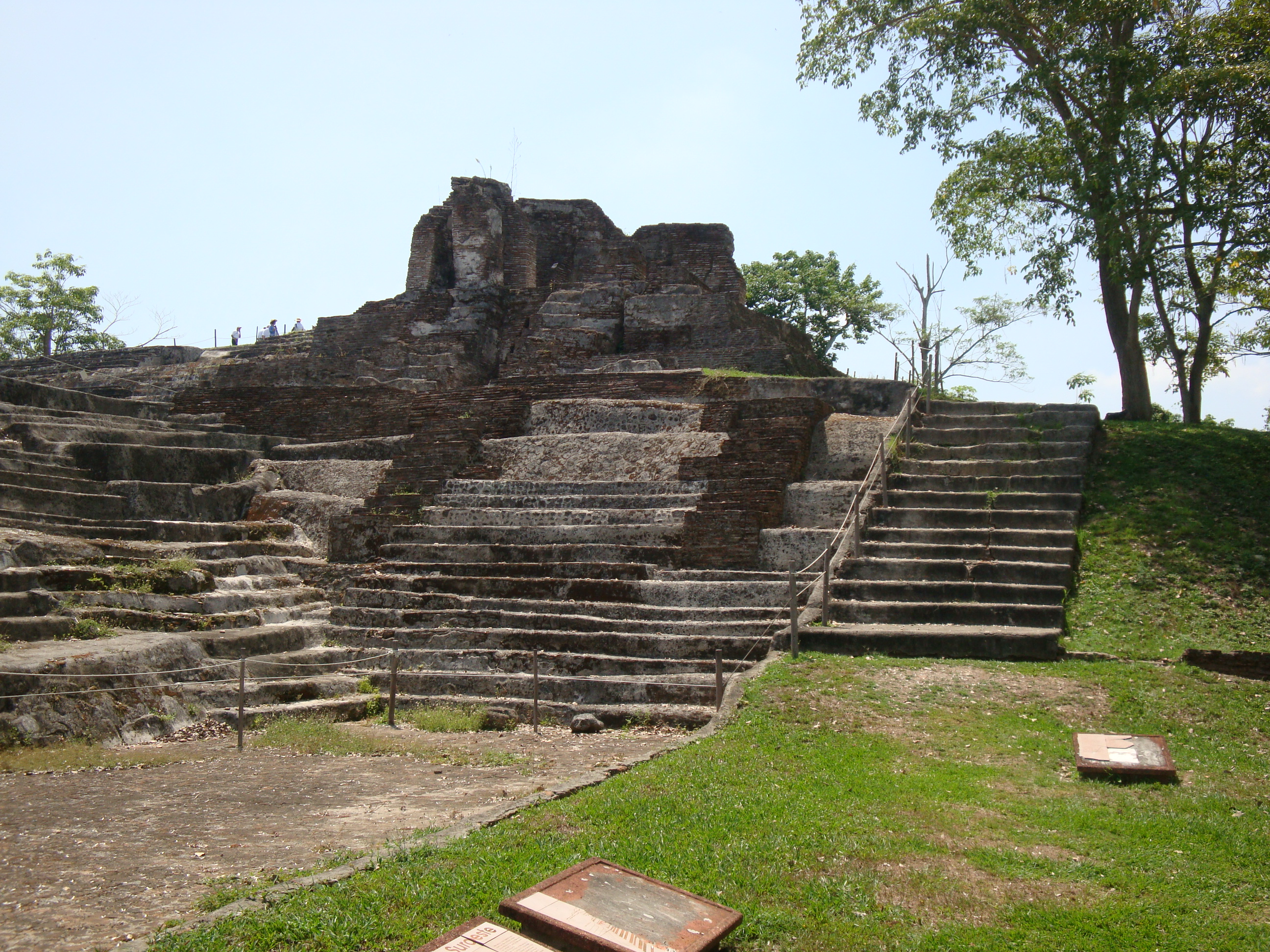
Temple IV in Comalcalco

La Venta was the most important civic-religious center of the Olmec civilization, the first major culture of Mesoamerica. The site shows a number of the characteristics of Olmec culture, including depictions of jaguars, colossal heads and images of figures of rotund children. The site dates back to about 1000 BC and declined around 400 AD, replaced in importance by San Lorenzo. The museum associated with La Venta is in Villahermosa proper, and called Parque Museo de la Venta. It contains thirty three major pieces from the site and includes displays about Olmec customs, government, astronomy and writing. This park was created in the 1950s by writer Carlos Pellicer to protect the most important pieces of the archeological site. There are also exhibits on the flora and fauna of the area.

Comalcalco is a Maya archeological site near the modern city of the same name, on a bank of the Mezcalapa River. While it is not the only Mayan city whose monumental architecture is of adobe brick instead of stone, it is the only one which has had extensive reconstruction, and is open to the public. The Mayas here used adobe because of the lack of building stone in the area, instead using the abundant clay and lime extracted from shells. The Mayan city developed between 800 and 1100 AD, contemporary with Palenque and Yaxchilan. The name of the site comes from Nahuatl and means place of comals (a kind of cooking pan), but its Mayan name was Hoi Chan, which means "cloudy sky". The site covers 577 hectares and with a total of 282 structures. The main monuments are La Plaza Norte, La Gran Acropolis and the Eastern Acropolis.

Pomoná is a Mayan site discovered in 1959. The city was established in the Classic period, achieving its height in the late Classic and falling in the early Post Classic. It is on the Usumacinta River, giving it an important role in the political and economic relations of the time, as many ocean products passed through here on their way to the Peten area. Its original name is not known and it is currently named after a nearby modern settlement. It has six important groups of buildings with residential areas extending over 175 hectares.

The main plazas with their ceremonial structures are similar to those found in Tikal and the towers of Río Bec. There are seven principal structures surrounded by numerous smaller ones. Many of the stele from the site can be found at the José Gómez Panaco Museum in the nearby city of Balancán.

In 2020, the largest and oldest Mayan temple yet discovered was uncovered using lidar at the Aguada Fénix site in Tabasco.

Archaeological and colonial tourism in Tabasco

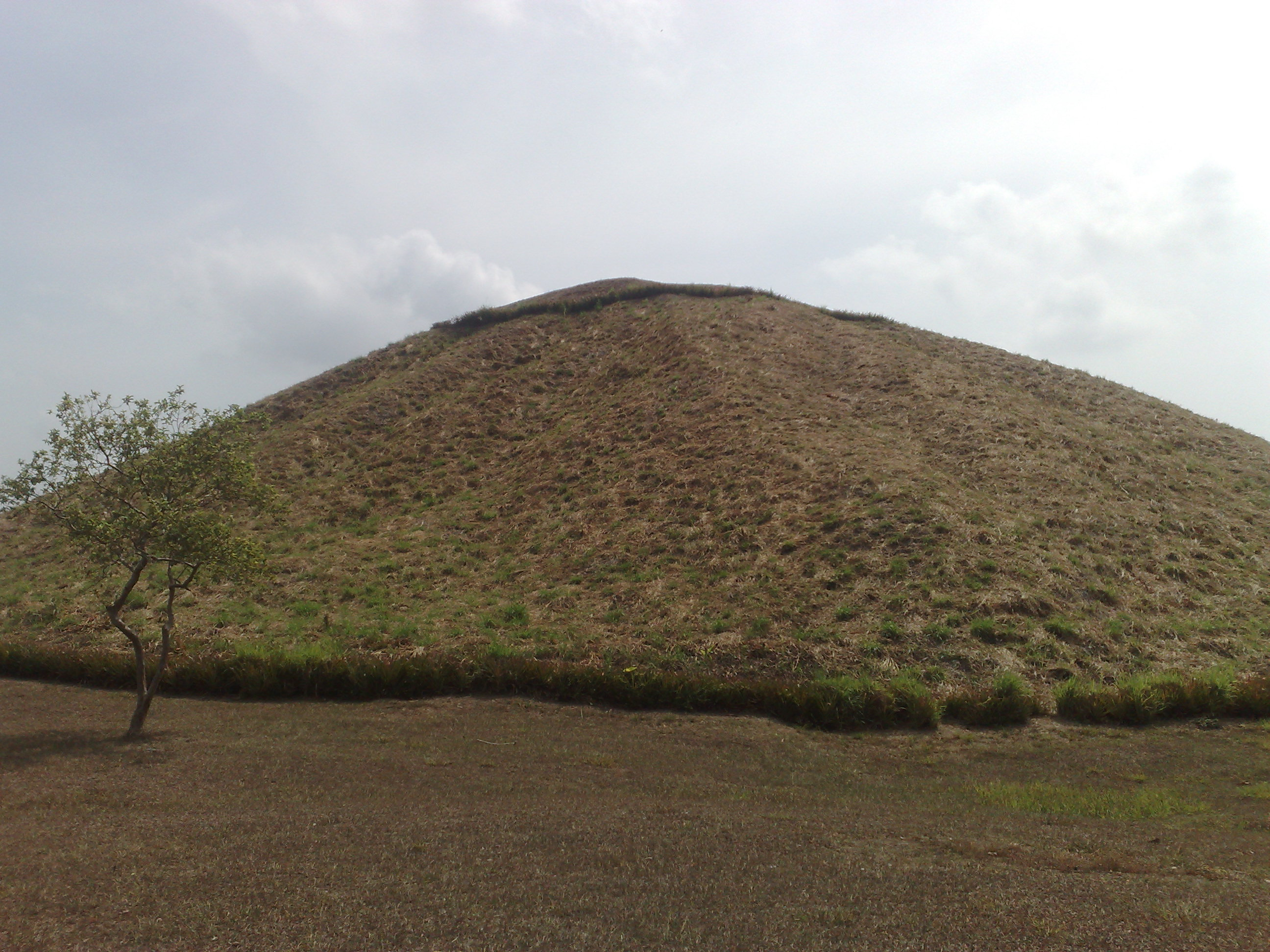
La Venta

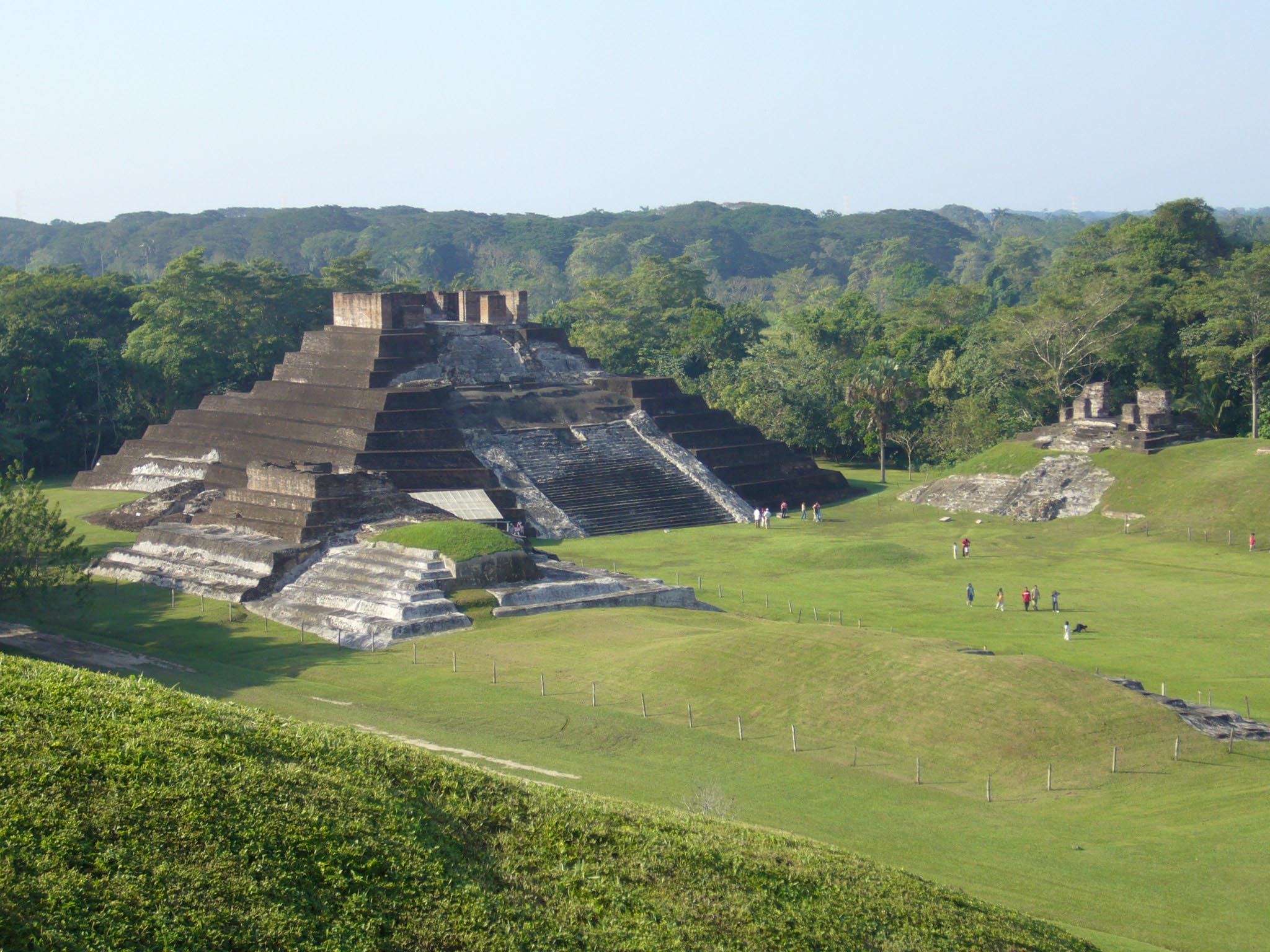
Comalcalco

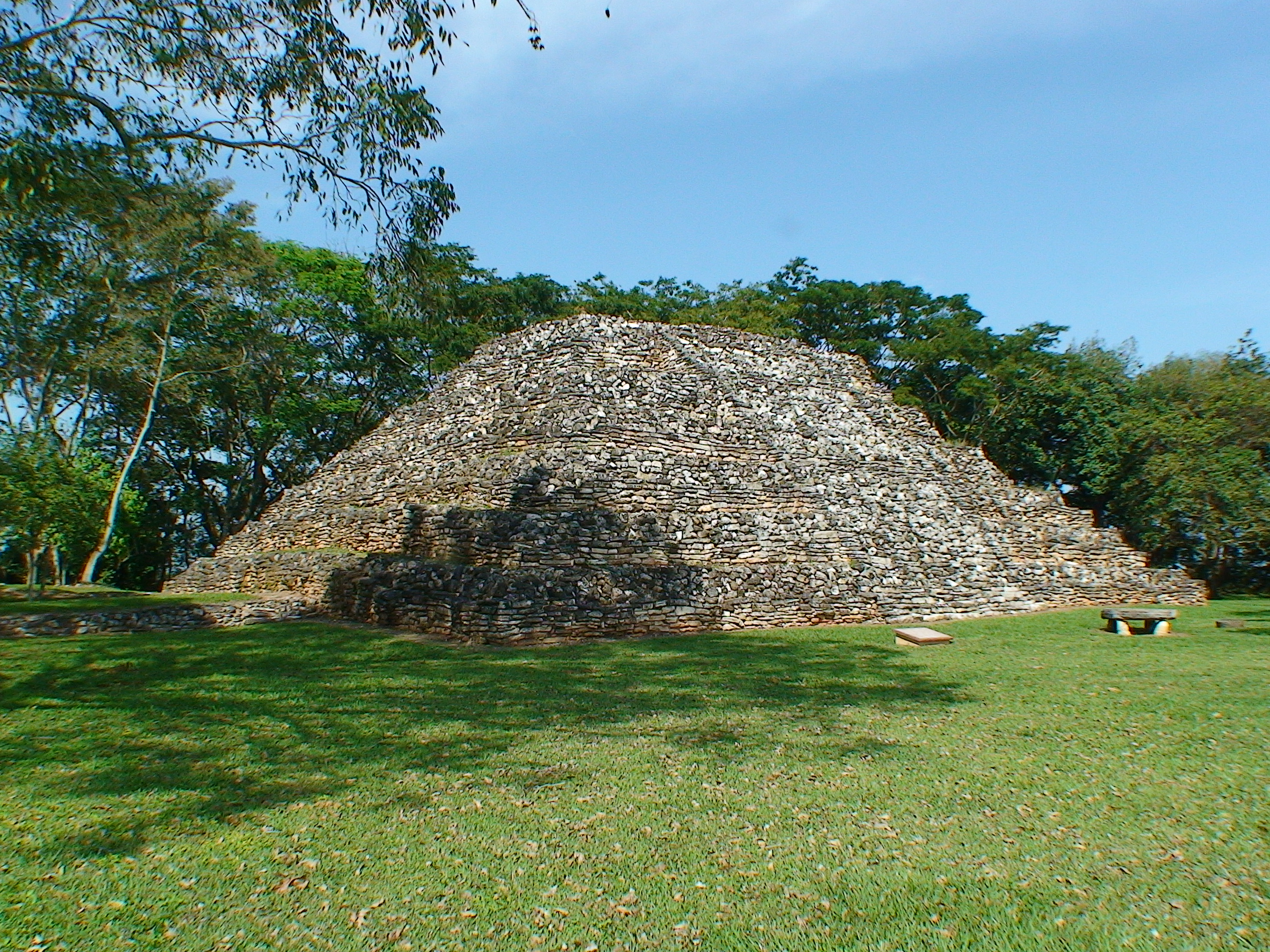
Pomoná

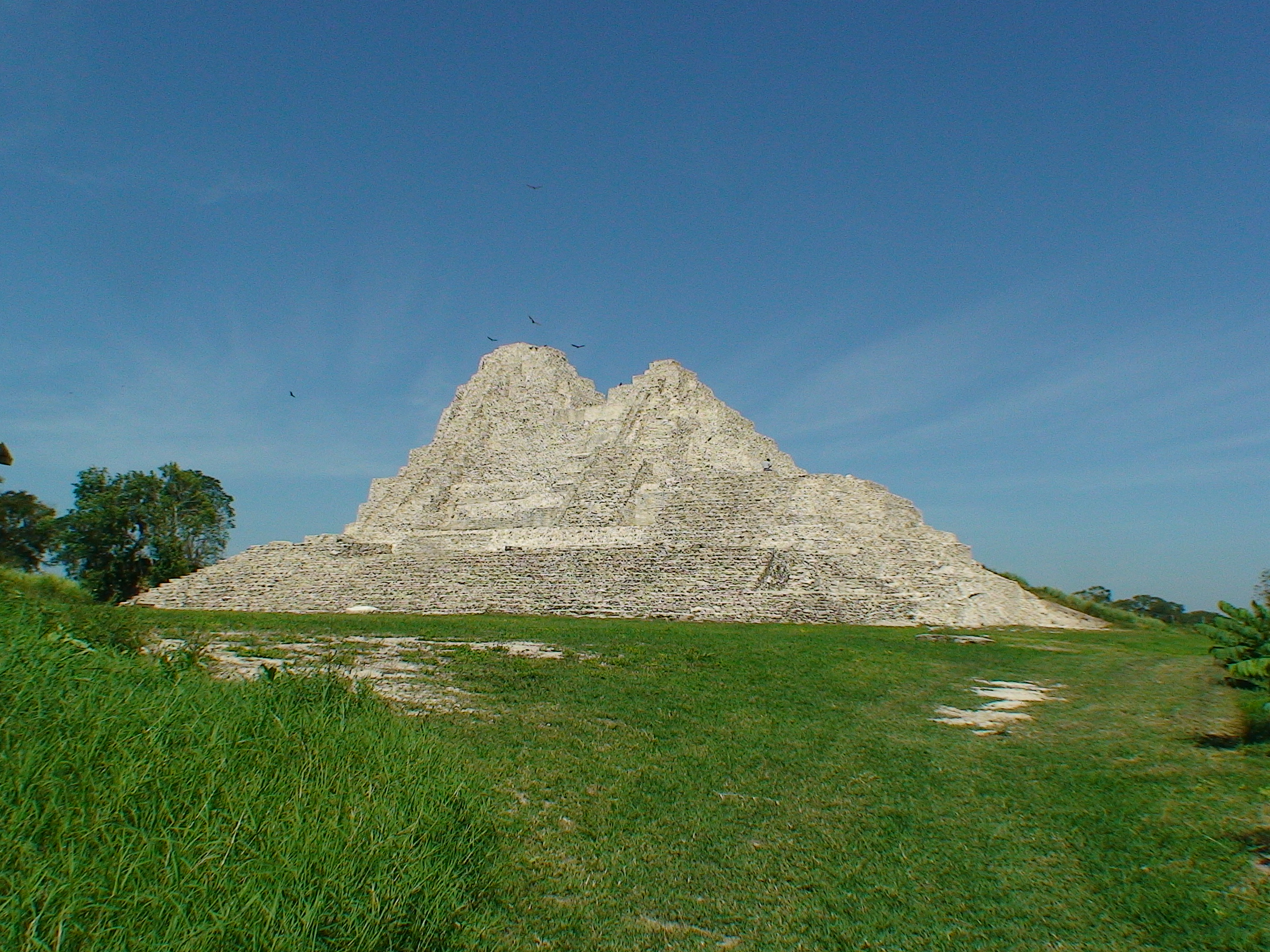
Moral-Reforma

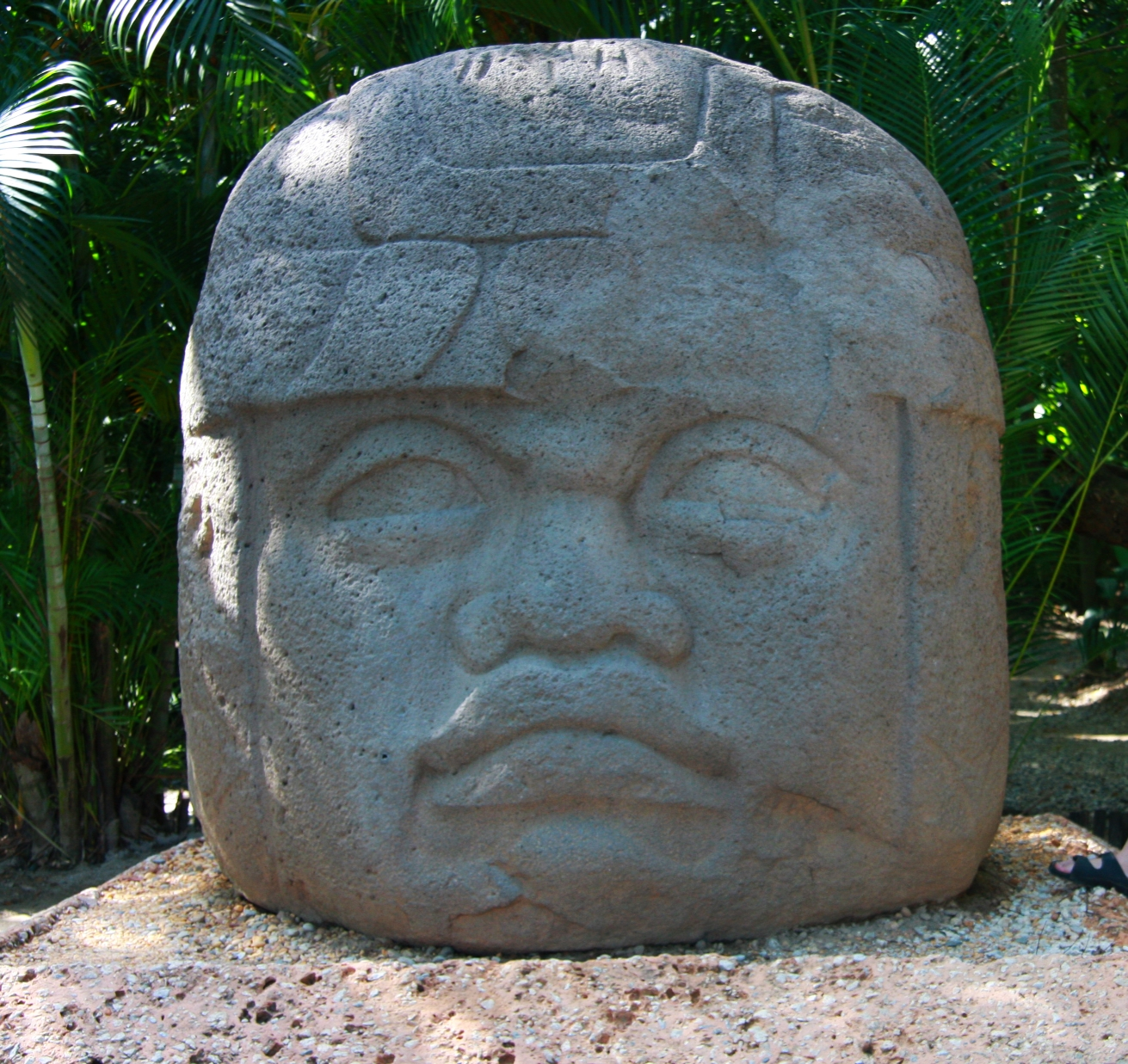
Olmec Head, La Venta Park

Oxolotán

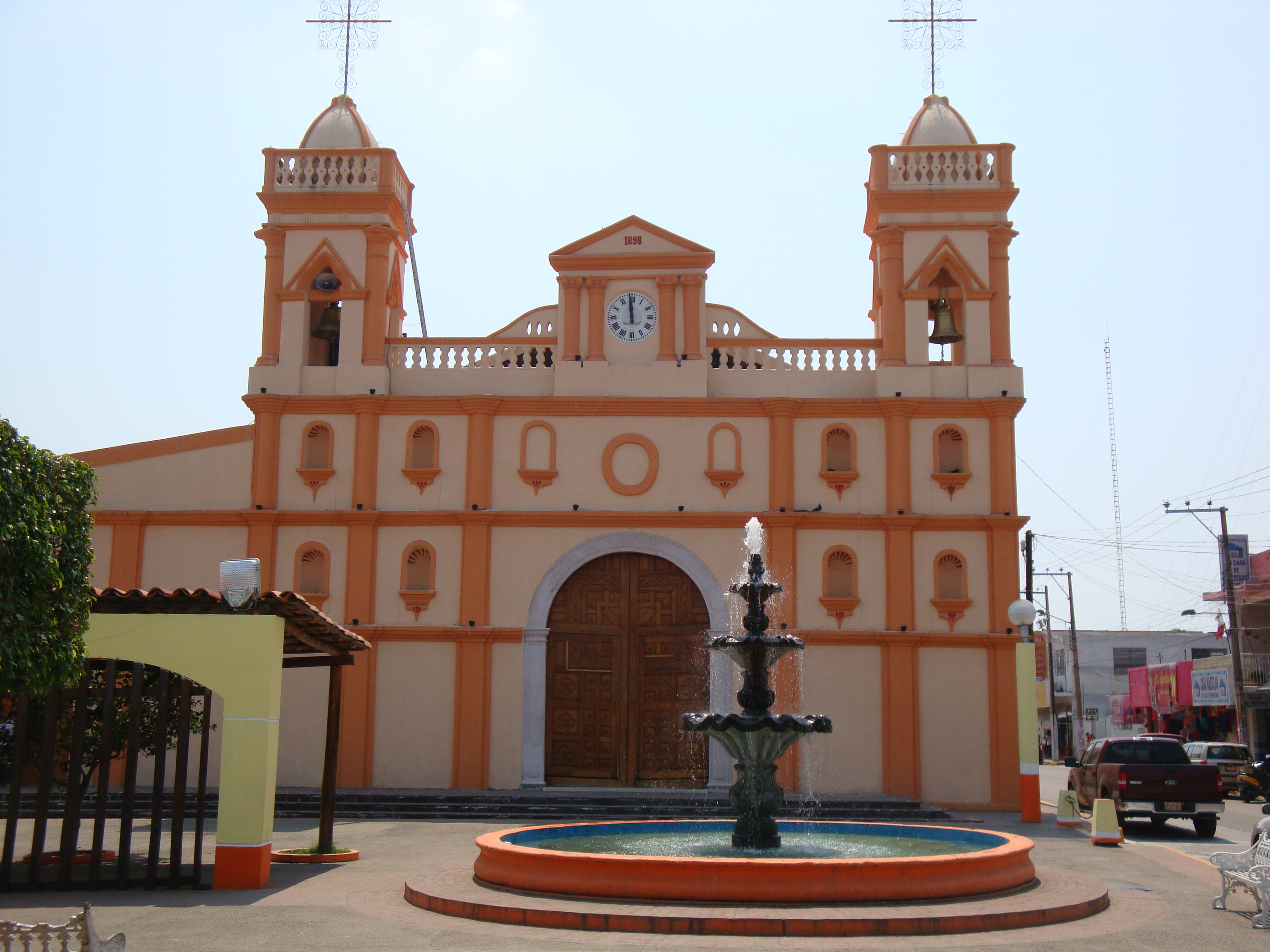
Cunduacán

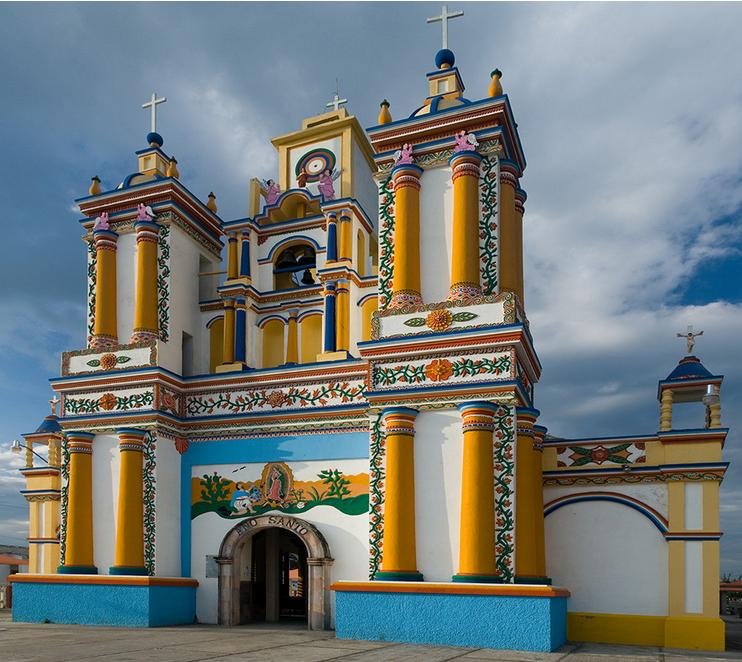
Cupilco

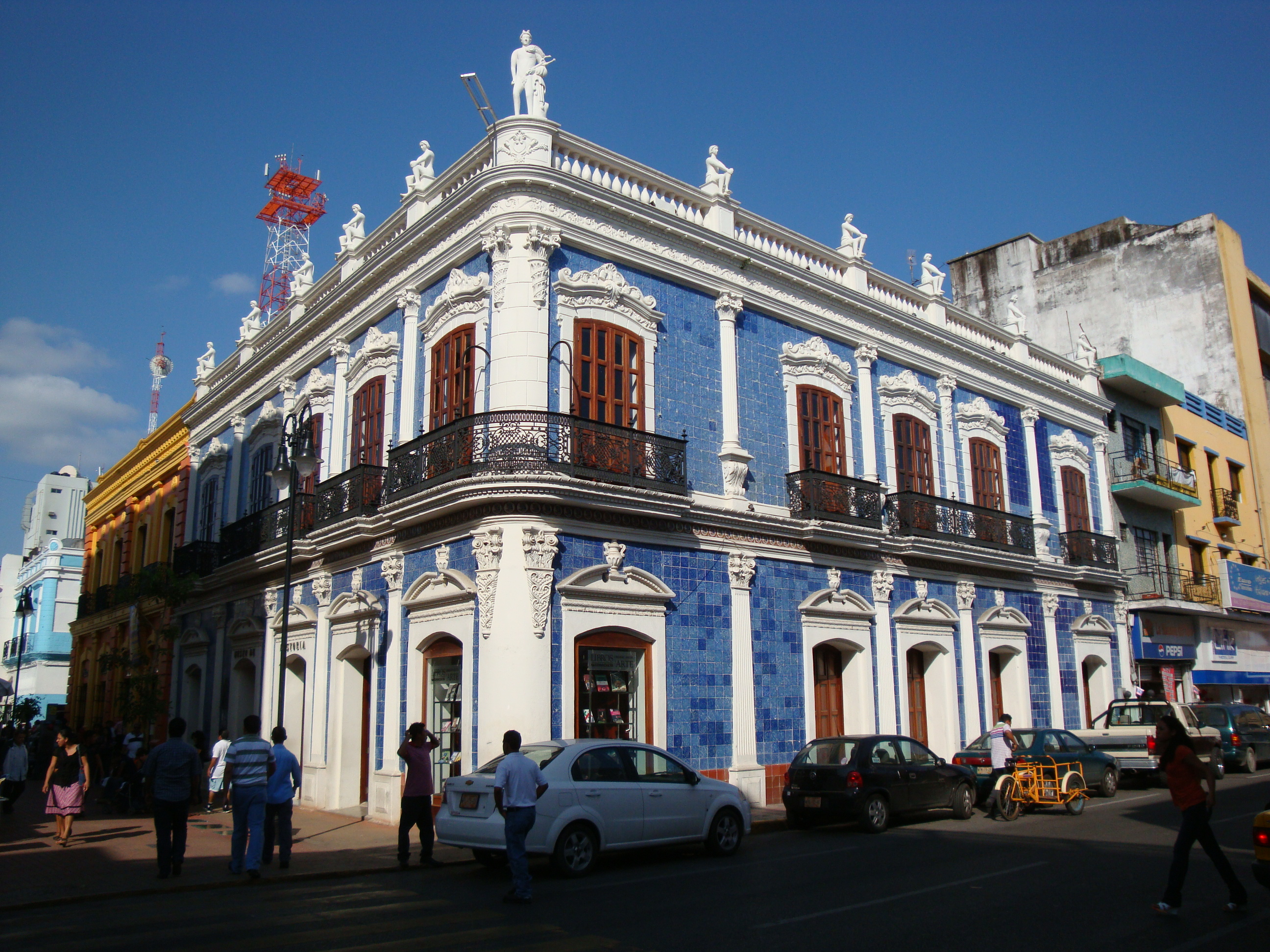
Villahermosa

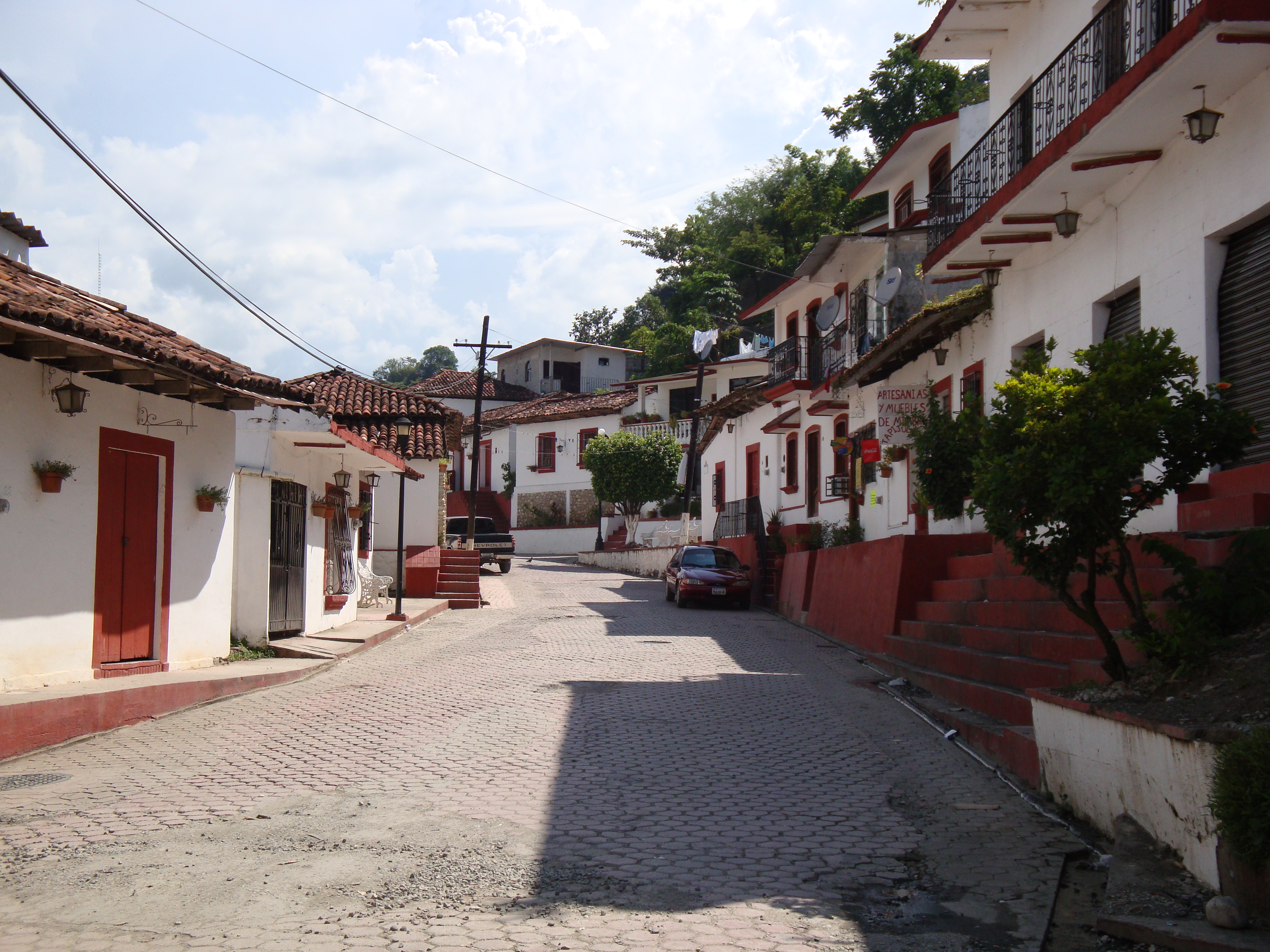
Tapijulapa

== Education ==
The state's population growth has put pressure on the educational system with about forty percent of its population school age. The average schooling in Tabasco has climbed from 2.7 years in 1970 to 6.7 years in 1995. In the same time period, the level percentage of the population which was illiterate fell from 25.7% to 11%. Today, the average schooling is 8.6 years or the third year of middle school, which is the national average.

As of the 2008/2009 school year, the state has 4,910 primary and middle school. Primary and middle school education is ranked next to last of all federal entities. It has 269 high schools and vocational school, ranking 30th of 32. It has 57 colleges and universities, ranking next to last. The state has sixteen major institutes of higher education, with four universities, three technological colleges, seven teachers’ colleges an "instituto de estudios superiors" and one post graduate college. These include the Escuela Normal Urbana de Balancán, Escuela Normal Justo Sierra Méndez, Escuela Normal Graciela Pintado de Madrazo, Escuela Normal Pablo García Avalos, Colegio Rosario María Gutiérrez Eskildsen, Colegio Monte Cristo, Centro de Estudios Culturales, Universidad Juárez Autónoma de Tabasco, Universidad Olmeca, Institutio Tecnológico de Villahermosa, Instituto Tecnológico Agropecuario Num.28, Instituto Tecnológico Superior de Comalcalco, Centro de Estudios Universitarios de Villahermosa, Instituto de Educación Superior Alfa y Omega, Universidad Pedagógica Nacional and the Colegio de Posgraduados en Ciencias Agrícolas.

The Universidad Intercultural del Estado de Tabasco was founded in 2006 as a state university to offer higher education to those from lower socioeconomic classes and indigenous communities.

== Communications and transportation ==
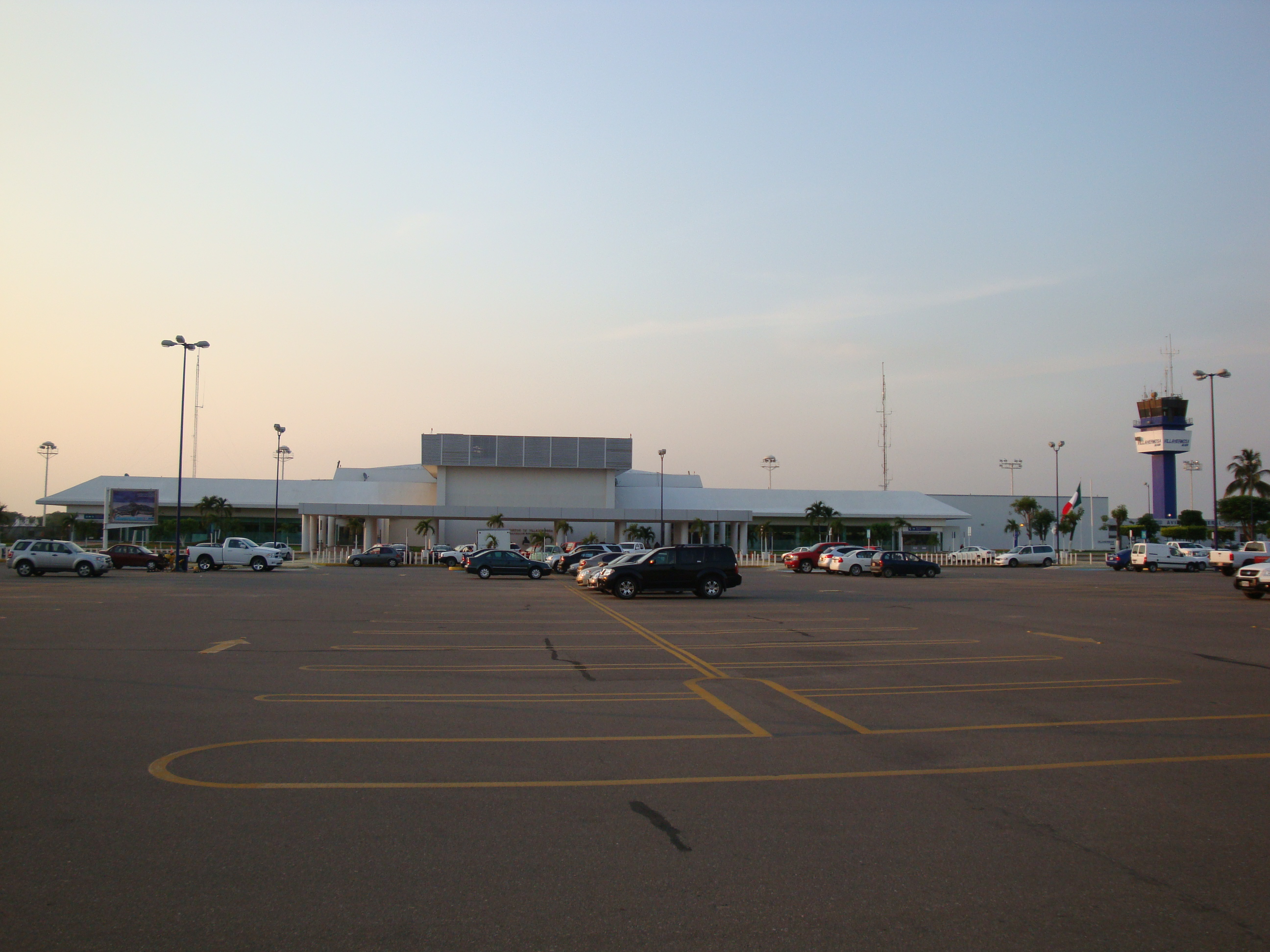
Villahermosa International Airport

=== Media ===
The state has thirty-three radio stations and thirteen television stations, nine of which are repeaters for programs from Mexico City. The two local stations are Televisión de Tabasco and Canal 9.

Newspapers of Tabasco include: Diario de la Tarde de Tabasco, El Heraldo de Tabasco, El Sol del sureste, Esto de Tabasco, Milenio Tabasco, Novedades de Tabasco, Presente Diario del Sureste, and Tabasco Hoy.

=== Transport ===
The state has 9,092 kilometres (5,650 miles) of federal, state and rural roads. The most important highways in the state are the Coatzacoalcos-Villahermosa, Tuxtla Gutiérrez-Villahermosa, Escárcega-Villahermosa and Cd. Del Carmen-Frontera-Villahermosa. There are also 315 kilometres (196 mi) of rail line which transports 523,468 tons of cargo per year as well as passengers.

The C.P.A. Carlos Rovirosa International Airport is located just outside Villahermosa. It offers service to various cities in Mexico along with Havana, Cuba and Houston, Texas.

== See also ==
- Olmecs
