= Chontal Maya language =

Maya language of Tabasco, Mexico

Chontal Maya
- Yokotʼan
- Pronunciation: [jɔʔkɔʔtʼan]
- Native to: Mexico
- Region: North central and southern Tabasco
- Ethnicity: Chontal Maya
- Native speakers: 61,000 (2020 census)
- Language family: Mayan: Cholan–Tzeltalan; Cholan; Chol–Chontal; Chontal Maya
- Dialects: Nacajuca / Central; Tamulte / Eastern; Macuspana / Southern; Centla / Northern

Language codes
- ISO 639-3: chf
- Glottolog: taba1266
- ELP: Chontal de Tabasco

Chontal Maya, known to native speakers as Yokotʼan, is a Maya language of the Cholan family spoken in 2020 by around 60,000 Chontal Maya people of the Mexican state of Tabasco. According to the National Catalog of Indigenous Languages of Mexico-INALI, Yokotʼan has at least four dialects: Nacajuca (Central), Centla (Northern), Macuspana (Southern) and Tamulte (Eastern).

== Geographical distribution ==
The Chontal Maya are concentrated in 159 settlements in 5 municipalities of Tabasco (Brown 2005:122).

- Centla
- Centro
- Jonuta
- Macuspana
- Nacajuca (comprising more than 50% of the Chontal Maya population)

Some Chontal settlements near the town of Nacajuca include (Brown 2005:116):

- El Tigre
- Saloya
- Guatacaloa
- Olcuatitan
- Tucta
- Mazatehuapa
- Tapotzingo
- Guaytalpa
- San Simón
- Tecoluta
- Oxiacapue
- Guadalupe
- El Sitio
- Tamulte

Some Chontal settlements in the northeastern Centla region include (Brown 2005:116):

- Cuauhtemoc
- Vicente Guerrero
- Allende
- Simón Sarlat
- Quitin Arauz (on the Río Usumacinta)

Chontal settlements near Macuspana include Benito Juárez and Aquiles Serdan (Brown 2005).

== Phonology ==
Consonants
		Bilabial	Dental	Alveolar	Palatal	Velar	Glottal
Nasal		m		n			
Plosive/ Affricate	voiceless	p	t	ts	tʃ	k	ʔ
Plosive/ Affricate	glottalized	pʼ	tʼ	tsʼ	tʃʼ	kʼ	
Plosive/ Affricate	voiced	b	d				
Fricative				s	ʃ		h
Tap/Flap				ɾ			
Approximant		w		l	j		

Vowels
	Front	Central	Back
Close	i	ɨ	u
Mid	e		o
Open		a	
