= Jalpa de Méndez Municipality =

Municipality in the Mexican state of Tabasco

Coordinates: 18°08′N 93°05′W

Jalpa de Méndez
- Municipality
- Location of the municipality in Tabasco.
- Country: Mexico
- State: Tabasco
- Seat: Jalpa de Méndez

Government
  - Federal electoral district: Tabasco's 5th
- Time zone: UTC-6 (Zona Centro)

Jalpa de Méndez is a municipality in the Mexican state of Tabasco.

The seat is at Jalpa de Méndez.

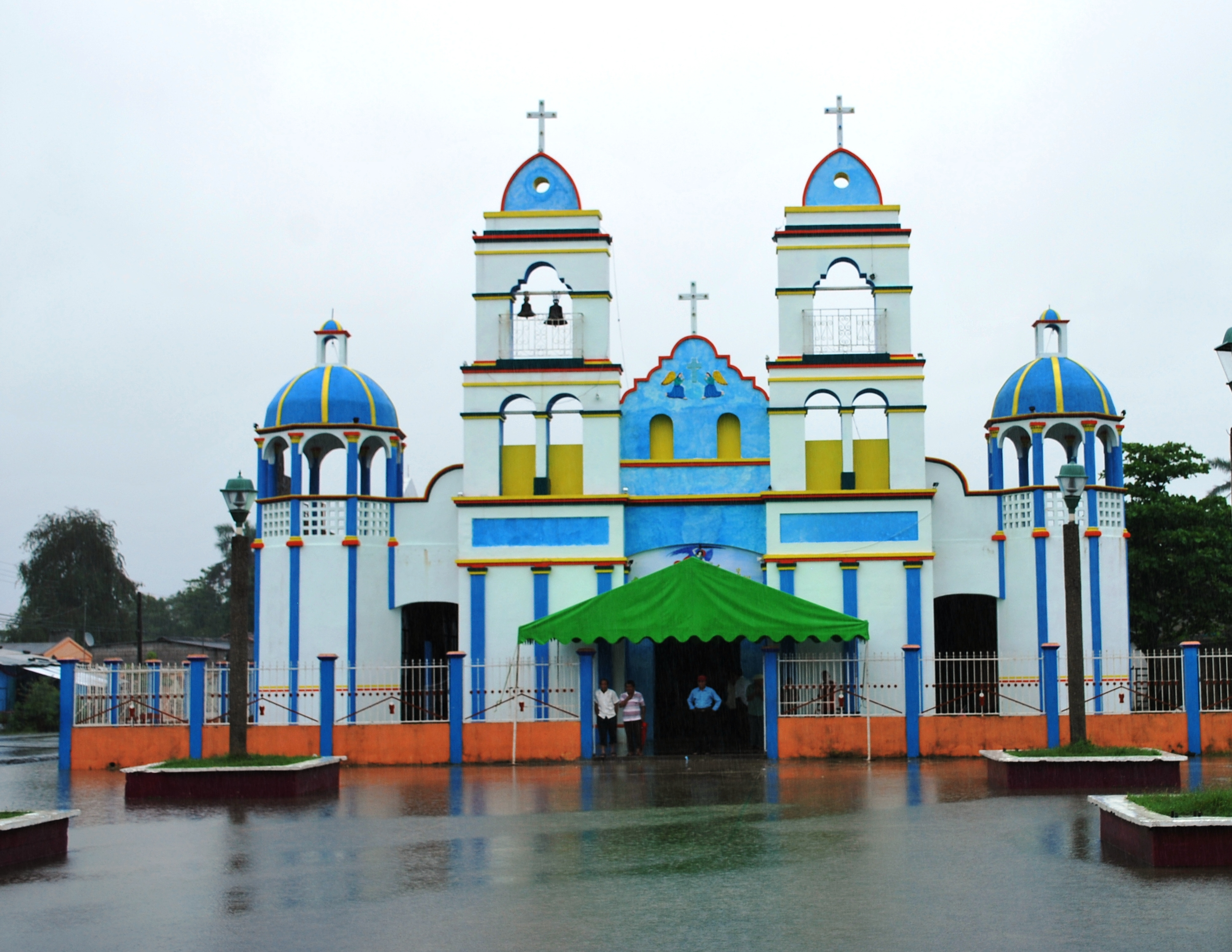
Facade of the church in Ayapa

The municipality of Jalpa de Méndez makes up part of the Grijalva River region of the state and the Chontalpa sub-region. It borders the municipalities of Paraíso, Centla, Cunduacán, Nacajuca and Comalcalco. There are 64 active communities in the municipality, with a population of 83,356 in 2010, up from 72,969 in 2005, with a count of 19,630 residences in 2010. It is considered to be one of the Chontal Maya areas of the state of Tabasco, but only 396 people speak an indigenous language, and about half of those speak Zapotec.

The municipal government consists of a municipal president, a treasury official and 12 community representatives called “regidors.”

All schools are directed at the municipal level. There are 155 scholastic centers with 62 primary schools, 22 middle schools, six high schools, two vocational centers, three centers for special education with ten laboratories, 26 workshops, and forty four public libraries. These serve about 21,500 students.

Various state highways and municipal roads cross the municipality. Important roads include the Villahermosa-Comalcalco highway, which connects Jalpa with Comalcalco and Nacajuca. The Samaria-Jalpa de Méndez highway connects the municipality with Cunduacán. The Tulipán-Jalpa de Méndez highway connects it with federal highway 187 and the Jalpa de Méndez-Chiltepec connects it with the Paraíso municipality. There is one intercity bus terminal.

Aside from the municipal seat, there are a number of other important communities. There are two mostly indigenous communities called Ayapa and Mecoacán. Both have churches painted in bright colors called San Miguel Arcángel and San Mateo, respectively. Ayapa is 35 km from the municipal seat with a population of about 4,600. Its main economic activities are livestock and the production of decorated gourds even though three oil wells of the Ayapa field are in its jurisdiction. Mecoacán is located eight km from the municipal seat with a population of about 3,200 people. It main economic activities are agriculture, the raising of pigs and domestic fowl and petroleum production. Iquinuapa is located four km from the municipal seat with a population of about 3,500 people. Its main economic activities are agriculture and handcrafts. Villa Jalupa is six km from the municipal seat with a population of about 3,400. Its main economic activity is agriculture. Soyataco is four km from the municipal seat with a population of about 3,250. Its main economic activity is agriculture. Hermenegildo Galeana 2ª is located six km from the municipal seat with a population of about 1,250 people. Its main economic activity is the production of cacao and coconut.
