= Nacajuca Municipality =

Municipality in the Mexican state of Tabasco

Coordinates: 18°08′N 93°01′W

Nacajuca
- Municipality
- Location of the municipality in Tabasco.
- Country: Mexico
- State: Tabasco
- Seat: Nacajuca

Government
  - Federal electoral district: Tabasco's 5th
- Time zone: UTC-6 (Zona Centro)

Nacajuca is a municipality in the Mexican state of Tabasco.

The seat is Nacajuca.

== Geography ==
The municipality is located in the north of the state of Tabasco in the Chontalpa region, bordering the municipalities of Jalpa de Méndez, Centla, Centro and Cunduacán. Its territory measures 488.37 km^{2} (188.56 sq mi) or 2.1% of the state, ranking 13th out of 17 municipalities in size. There are 72 total communities, which include one city (the seat), eleven communities, 28 ranches, fourteen ejidos, three congregations and three rural subdivisions. It has six regional development centers in which most of the area's economic and social activities are concentrated: Lomitas, Sandial, Taxco, Oxiacaque, Guatacalca and Mazateupa. The municipal government consists of a municipal president, a treasurer, two secretaries, ten representatives called regidores and nine departments.

=== Communities ===
In addition to the seat, the municipality has a number of other notable communities. The Bosque de Saloya is a residential development located on the municipality's border with the Centro (Villahermosa) municipality. It has a population of over 8,000 as well due to its proximity to the capital, separated from it only by the Carrizal River. Due to population pressures, there are many irregular settlements in the area. It is considered to be part of the Villahermosa metropolitan area. Lomitas is located 23 km from the municipal seat with a population of about 2,900 people. Its main economic activity is agriculture. Guatacalco is located 18 km from the municipal seat with a population of about 2,700 people. Its main economic activities are agriculture and handcrafts. Samarkanda is located four km from the municipal seat with a population of about 2,750 people. Its main economic activities are livestock and agriculture. Sandial is located 27 km from the municipal seat with a population of about 2,300 people. Its main economic activity is livestock. Tapotzingo is located five km from the municipal seat with a population of about 2,300 people, Its main economic activity is agriculture. Saloya, 1ª Secc is located four km from the municipal seat with a population of about 1,450 people.

== Education ==
The municipality has 152 schools and other educational installations which serve about 24,000 students. There are 64 preschools, 67 primary schools, 16 middle schools, five high schools, one vocational education center, thirteen laboratories, twelve workshops, 29 school libraries and four public libraries. In 2010, the Instituto Tecnológico de Nacajuca was opened in order to decentralized higher education in the state.

== Transportation ==
The municipality has 124.7 km of paved major roadways including 105.9 km of federal and state highways and 18.8 km of rural roads. There are forty six vehicular bridges. The main highways include: Federal Highway 187 Comalcalco - Jalpa - Nacajuca, Federal Highway 180 Cunduacán –Jalpa de Méndez – Nacajuca and Federal Highway 180 Santa Cruz – Paraíso – Jalpa de Méndez – Nacajuca.

== Economy ==
Its main economic activities are livestock and agriculture. Saloya is noted for its restaurants which serve traditional dishes, especially freshwater fish. Mazateupa is located four km from the municipal seat with a population of about 1,700 people. Its main economic activity is the making of handcrafts.
