= Jalpa de Méndez =

City in the Mexican state of Tabasco

Jalpa de Méndez, Tabasco
- City
- Jalpa de Méndez
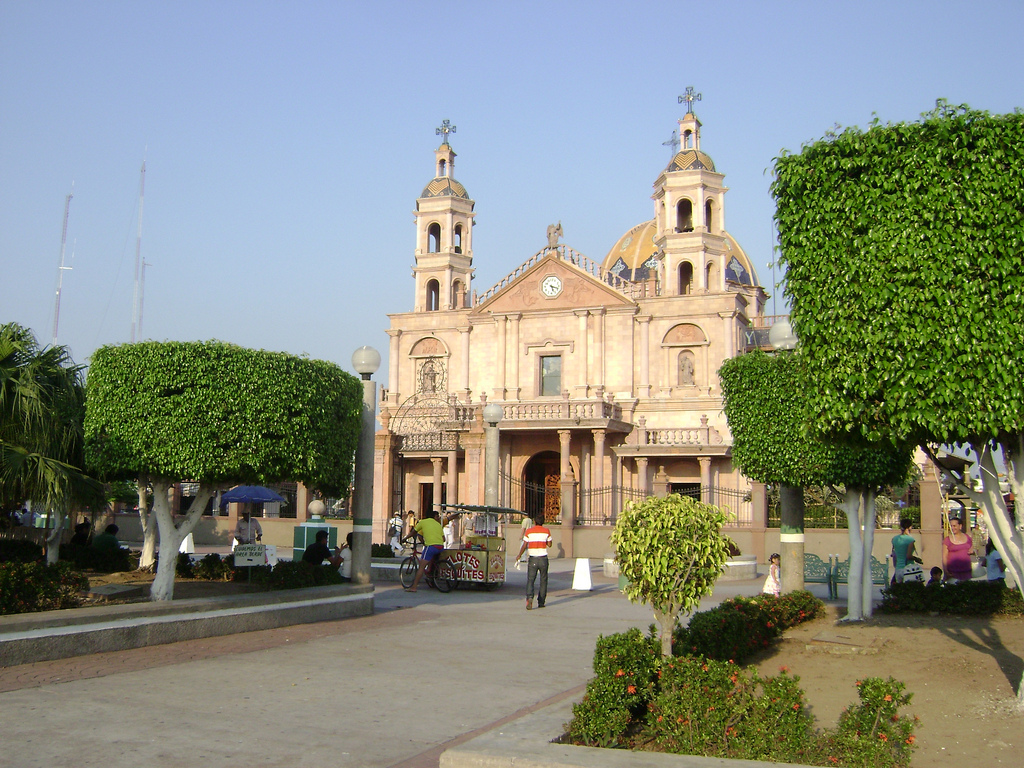
- Parque Central and Parish of San Francisco of Asís

- Location within Tabasco Location within Mexico
- Coordinates: 18°10′35″N 93°03′47″W
- Country: Mexico
- State: Tabasco
- Municipal Status: 1837

Government
  - Municipal President: Renán López Sánchez
  - Federal electoral district: Tabasco's 5th
- Elevation (of seat): 10 m (33 ft)

Population (2010) Municipality
  - Municipality: 83,356
- Time zone: UTC-6 (Central)
- Postal code (of seat): 86200
- Website: jalpademendez.gob.mx

Jalpa de Méndez is a city in Jalpa de Méndez Municipality located in the north of the Mexican state of Tabasco, Mexico. It is considered part of the Chontal Maya region of the state, known for its production of decorated dried gourds traditionally used for drinking chocolate and cured meats. Although there is some oil production and tourism, its main economic activity is agriculture, producing cacao, coconut and livestock.

== The city ==
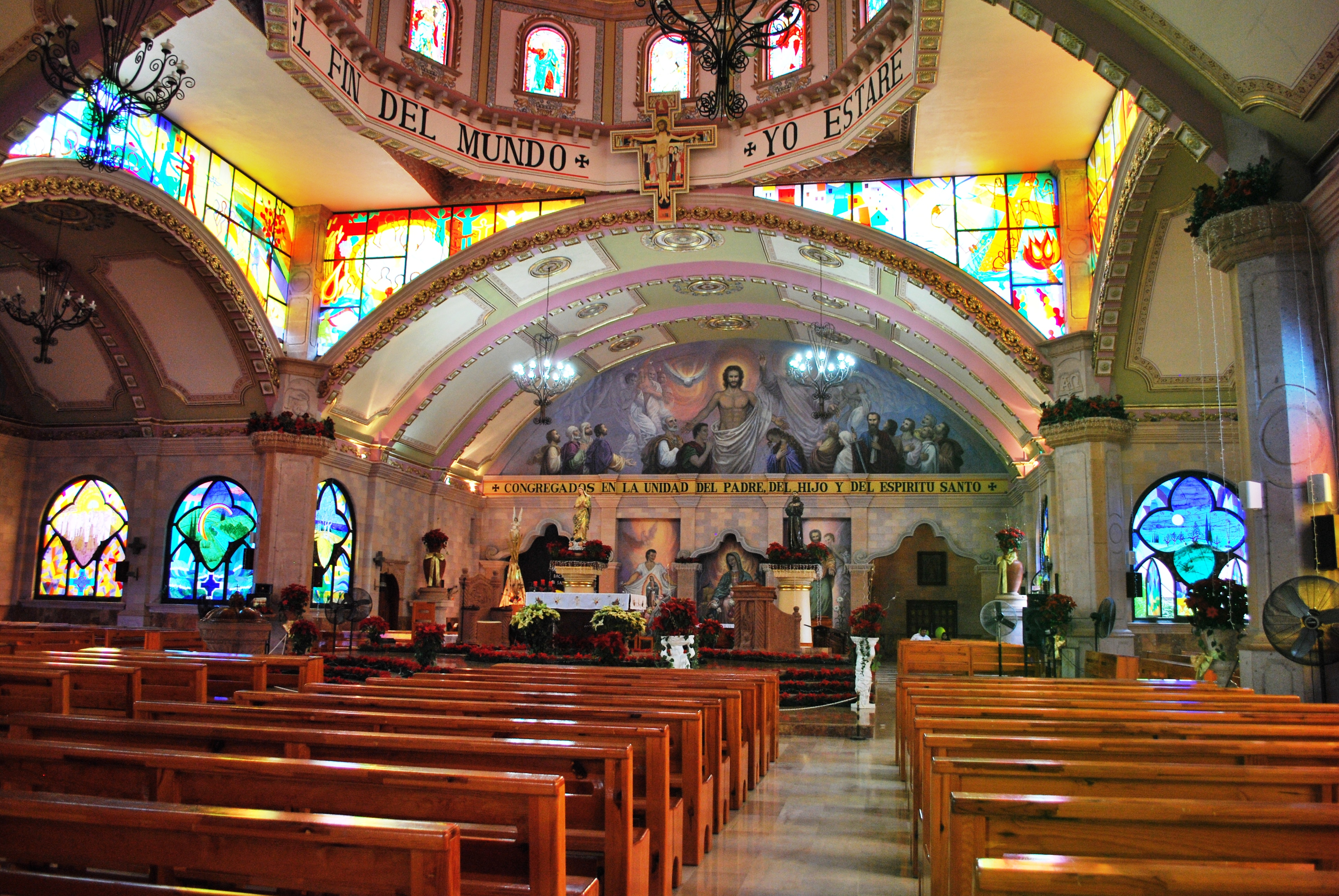
Interior of the San Francisco de Asís Church

The city of Jalpa de Méndez is 35 km from the state capital of Villahermosa with a population of about 13,330. The settlement has its beginnings as a village during the Mayan period. Since early in the colonial period, it has been the seat of government for the surrounding communities. Today, the city is the seat for a municipality of the same name, with the municipal, state and federal government offices principally located here. Its main economic activities are agriculture, livestock, fishing, commerce, services and tourism.

The historic center of the city is marked by the Parque Central or Central Park, which is a plaza with gardens with palm, almond and pine trees as well as other ornamental plants. There is a fountain in the center which is shaped as decorated gourd, the typical handcraft of the area.

The San Francisco de Asís Church is next to the plaza in the center of the city. It was restored recently. The church's facade is Neoclassical made of sandstone flanked by two bell towers. The interior is single nave with two main sections and a cupola in the center of the roof. One of the decorative features of the church is five doves in different colors, which symbolize five continents. In front of the church is a wide atrium with benches, lights and garden areas along with fountain which used to be a baptismal font.

The Coronel Gregorio Méndez Magaña House Museum is the former residence of the leader of Tabasco forces that defeated the French at the Battle of Jahuactal. The house is constructed of brick with a wood roof. Although the structure has been reconstructed several times, it still maintains its original look. In 1984, the building was reopened as a museum with six halls where items such as arms, drawings, photographs, oil paintings, historical documents and the coronel's personal belongings are displayed.

The Casa de Cultura or Cultural Center was constructed with an area of 713.12m2 between 1977 and 1982 specifically for its current purpose. It has exhibitions of drawings and painting along with other cultural events and classes, especially on weekends such as karate, guitar, piano, ballet, English, mathematics, modern dance and Mexican folk dance, especially the regional zapateo tabasqueño. It has an auditorium which is used for conferences and cinema events.

== Geography ==
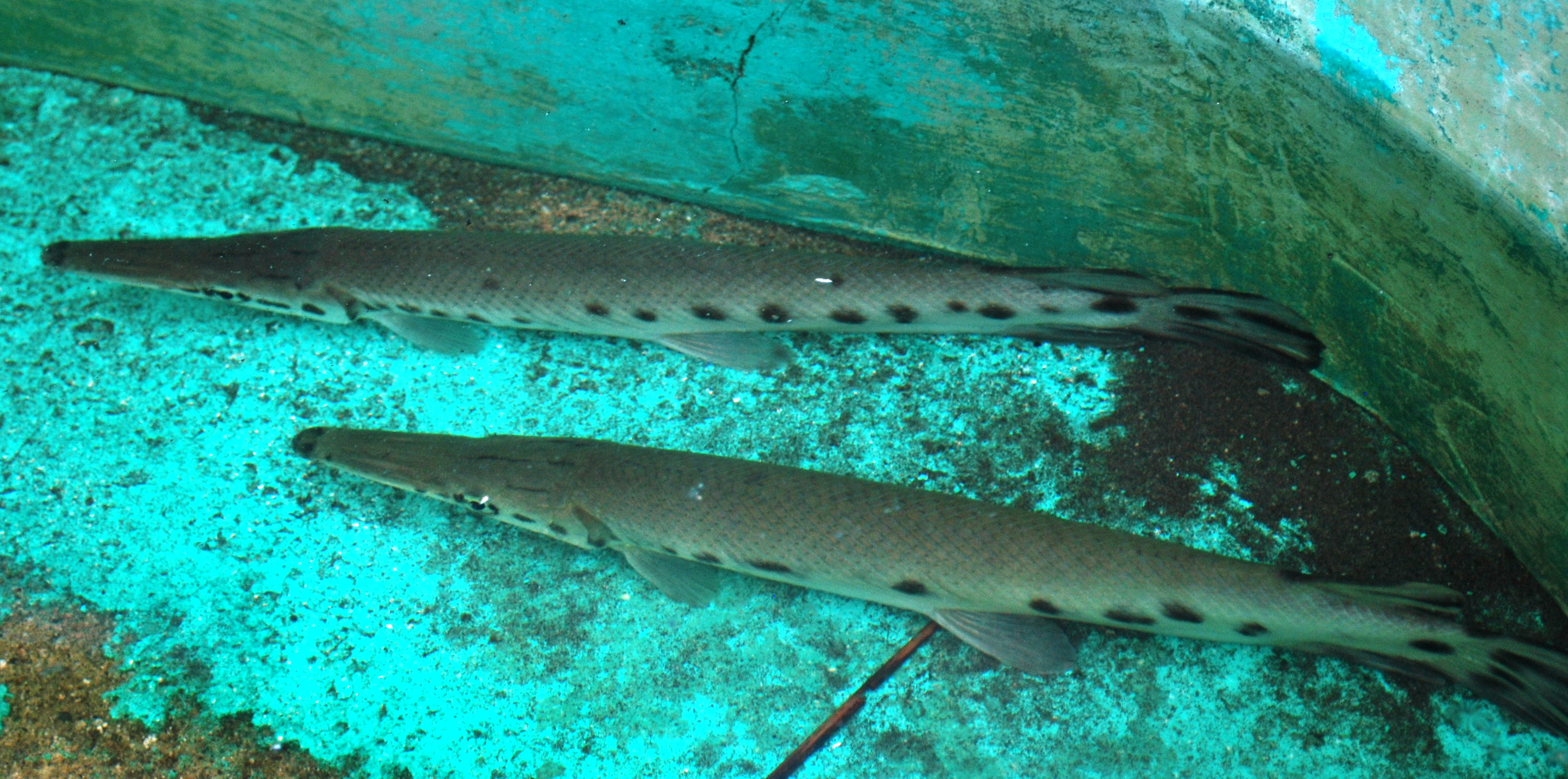
Pejalagarto fish

Most of the territory is flat with a few low hills with an average altitude of ten meters above sea level. The Nacajuca River forms the municipality's border with Cunduacán. The El Naranjo River forms the border with Nacajuca; the Cucuxchapa River forms the border with Paraíso and the Chiquistero River forms the border with Centla.

The lakes cover an area of 2,320 hectares. The important lakes in the area include Pomposú, El Eslabón, La Negrita, San Agustín, El Provecho, La Tinaja and El Troncón. The Pomposú Lake is located in the north of the municipality. The waters are of various shades of green with palm trees surrounding it. Fishing here can yield species such as bass, mojarra, tilapia and pejelagarto.

The climate is hot and humid with temperature changes during the year. The average high temperature is 30.5C which occur in June with the coldest temperatures averaging 22.5C which occur in December and January. Average annual rainfall is 1692mm per year but the rainiest month is October with an average of 696mm and only 20mm in April. Relative humidity ranges between 75 and 86% during the year. The windiest months are November and December, when fronts called “nortes” (because they come from the north) enter the state from the Gulf of Mexico. During these times average wind speed is 32 km/h, higher during storms.

The flat terrain and plentiful rainfall makes the area vulnerable to flooding. In addition to the floods of 2007, which covered 80% of the state of Tabasco, other recent major floods include those in 1999 and 2010. The 1999 flood was caused by a release of water from the Penitas hydroelectric dam to ease pressure on it and the 2010 flood was severe enough to warrant intervention by Mexico's National Commission for Human Rights Comisión Nacional de Derechos Humanos (CNDH).

Wildlife includes land and aquatic species such as parrots, macaws, storks, manatees and crocodiles. In wetland areas, there are still wild mangroves.

== History ==
The name Jalpa comes from the Nahuatl phrase Shal-pan which means place over sand or on the edge of sand. The settlement was one of many small villages that arose during the Mayan period. Hernán Cortés passed through the area on his way to what is now Honduras. Spanish families began to live in village, then called Xalpa, starting in 1550. The settlement became important during the colonial period and was named capital of the Chontalpa Region. The town was the seat of government for twelve other communities by 1665.

The settlement of Comalcalco was created in 1827 in an area controlled by Jalpa and in 1834, this area separated to form what are now the municipalities of Comalcalco and Paraíso. The modern municipality was established in 1837 by state congress, but the town was not named the seat until 1852. The official name for the municipality of Jalpa was decreed in 1882.

In 1887, the name was changed to Jalpa de Méndez to honor Gregorio Méndez Magaña, who fought against the French between 1863 and 1864. Jalpa was declared a city in 1955.

== Culture ==
The municipality has an annual fair at the end of May at the Parque Club Campestre. It includes cultural, commercial and agricultural exhibits and events. Cultural events are organized with local school and cultural centers. In addition there are handcrafts, regional food, amusement rides, folk dance as the crowning of a “Flor de Jícara” beauty queen. Carnival is an important annual event. It begins in January with the “quema de mal humor” or burning of bad mood using a paper mache figure. From then until Ash Wednesday, there are dances and people with lavish outfits, especially on Sundays accompanied by son music. Traditional dress for women consists of a long, full skirt with flowered patterns and a white cotton blouse with embroidery around the collar. For men, it consists of white cotton pants and shirt with a red handkerchief, a hat called a “chontal”, carrying bag and machete.

The local cuisine is distinguished its use of cured meats such as head cheese and longaniza sausage. Sweets include those made from sesame seen and pine nuts and traditional drinks include chorote, pinol and cacaotada.

== Economy ==
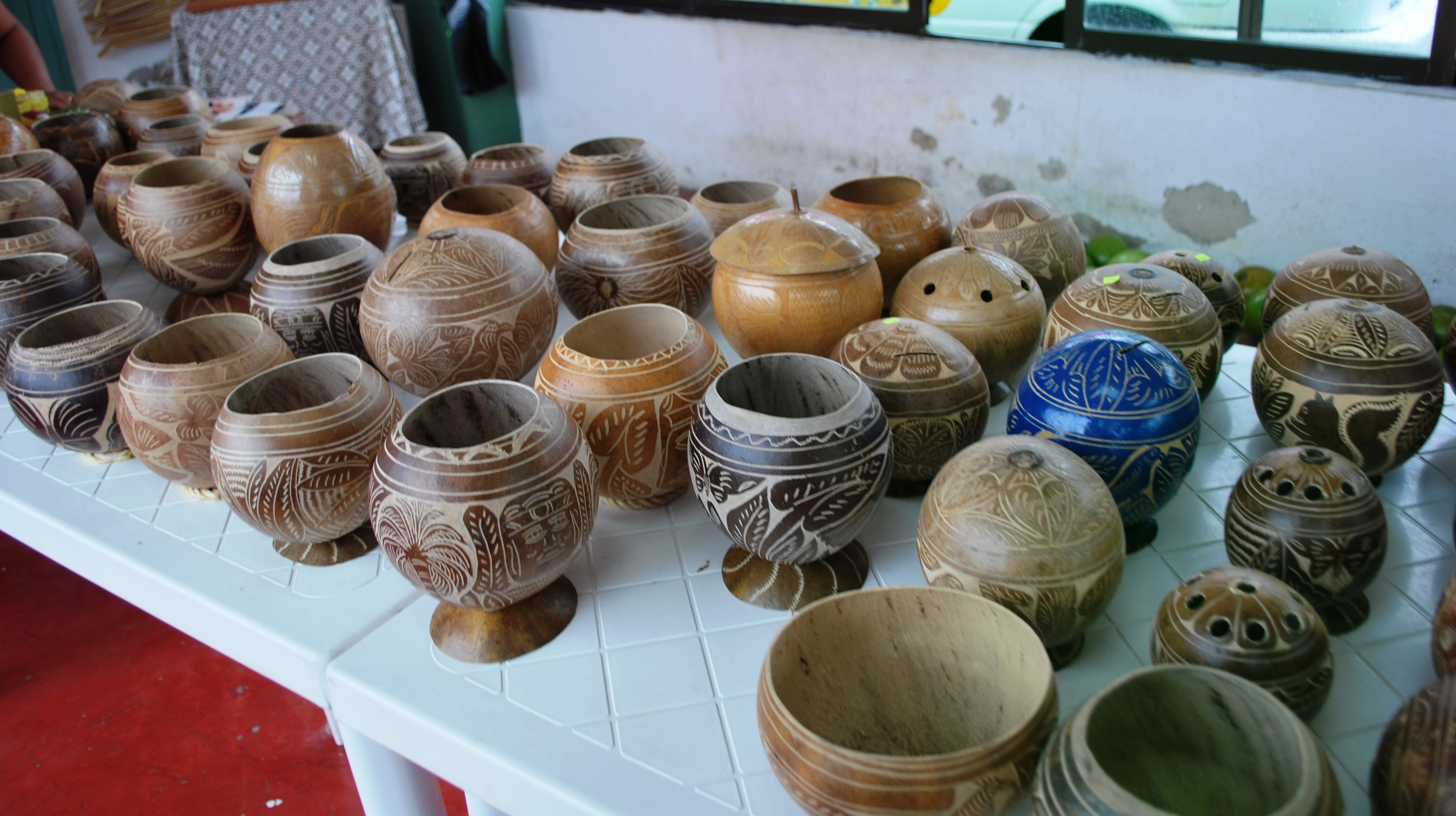
Decorated gourds for sale in Jalpa

Thirty five of the sixty four active communities in the municipality or about 54% are considered to have some level of socioeconomic marginalization, with the overall municipality considered to have a medium level of marginalization.

The main economic activity of the municipality is still agriculture, with main crops being basic grains, cacao and coconut. Livestock is an important part of the local economy and includes cattle, pigs, sheep, horses and domestic fowl. The area's lakes allow for fishing and aquaculture but it is not a major part of the economy.

The Don Remo tobacco farm and cigar factory was established in 1995 in the town of Tierra Adentro. The name is in honor of Remo Loaiza San Vicente who was an important tobacco farmer and father of the current owner of the factory, Alfonso Loaiza Garcia. The current enterprise began with Sumatra tobacco and by 1997 it was cultivating fifty hectares, with a yield of about 1.5 tons per hectares. The factory covers an area of 550m2 to cure the leaves and produce the cigars. While this enterprise is relatively new, the growing of tobacco here dates back to the Mayans. However, the production of tobacco here has been declining due to the difficulty in obtaining supplies, poor crop yield and a declining local market. There have been recent efforts to support tobacco production in the state as part of its culture along with its cuisine.

There is no major industry in the municipality except for the Mecoacán oil field. Manufacturing is limited to handcrafts and food processing by small family businesses. One known food industry here is the production of cured meats such as head cheese and longaniza sausage. The main local handcraft is the drying and decoration of gourds which were traditionally used for storage and food service, but today are mostly created for tourists. The gourd, called a jicara, is traditional important as a vessel for chocolate. Today, it is still traditional to serve a chocolate drink called pozol in these gourds.

The commerce sector of the economy has developed in the last ten years with national chain stores arriving such as Bodega Aurrerá, Super Che, Soriana and Parisina Telas. Services such as banks, restaurants, auto and pharmacies are mostly for the local populace. There is one traditional municipal market called Daniel Santos Garcia located in the municipal seat.

State authorities have initiated programs to promote the area as a tourist attraction such as making it part of the Cacao Route, but local authorities have not yet seen results. However, signage and authorization to create ecotourism centers such as the planned Chontalpa Chica have not yet materialized.

The Pomposú Juliva Wetlands are on the delta of the Mezcalpa River. There is some ecotourism such as aquatic sports and excursions as well as a swamp crocodile sanctuary.

The Don Remo cigar factory offers tours.

The La Encantado turtle farm is the only one of its kind in Latin America, raising six species of turtle native to the state. It is located in Reforma Segunda Sección. It belongs to the Olán García family. In 2004, the enterprise received the Tabasco State Ecology Prize.
