= Christian Gregorio Díaz Carrasco =

Christian Gregorio Díaz Carrasco (born August 29, 1991) is a Mexican politician from the Party of the Democratic Revolution (PRD). He served as a first minority alternate senator for the state of Tabasco from February 1 to June 2, 2024.

== Biography ==
Christián Gregorio Díaz Carrasco was born in the Nicolás Bravo ranchería belonging to the municipality of Jalpa de Méndez, Tabasco. He graduated as an agricultural technician from the Centro de Bachillerato Tecnológico Agropecuario (CBT). He later studied Petroleum Engineering at the Technological Institute of Chontalpa in Nacajuca, Tabasco.

From 2013 to 2015, he served as a liaison for project procedures with federal agencies through Congress and/or the Chamber of Deputies in the municipality of Centro. From 2018 to 2024, he worked as an advisor in the Senate of the Republic. Additionally, from 2018 to 2024, he was the coordinator for the Municipality of Jalpa de Méndez with the Young Entrepreneurs Organization of Tabasco (JET).

He took office as the first minority senator on February 1, 2024, replacing Juan Manuel Fócil Pérez who took a temporary leave of absence from his seat to contend (unsuccessfully) for the governorship of Tabasco. This made him the youngest senator in that legislature. Fócil Pérez returned to his seat for the remainder of the 65th congressional session following the June 2024 election.

Subsequently, he informed his decision to join the Parliamentary Group of the PRD, having his first participation in the tribune on February 7, 2024. In the Senate, he held the position of Secretary of the Youth and Sports Commissions and of the National Defense Commission. He was also a member of the Economy Committee, Health Committee and the Finance and Public Credit Committee.
