= Macuspana Municipality =

Municipality in the Mexican state of Tabasco

Macuspana
- Municipality
- Coat of arms

- Location of the municipality in Tabasco.
- Coordinates: 17°45′N 92°35′W
- Country: Mexico
- State: Tabasco

Government
  - Federal electoral district: Tabasco's 1st

Area
  - Total: 2,429 km^{2} (938 sq mi)

Population (2020)
  - Total: 158,601
  - Density: 65.29/km^{2} (169.1/sq mi)
- Time zone: UTC-6 (Zona Centro)

Macuspana is a municipality in the Mexican state of Tabasco. Its seat is the city of Macuspana. The municipality covers an area of 2,429 km^{2} (938 sq mi) and has a total population of 158,601 as of the 2020 census. It is located in the Chilapa River basin in the Usumacinta region.

== Etymology ==
Several theories have been proposed for the origin of the word Macuspana. It might have been derived from the Nahuatl "Macui-chpana" meaning "place of the five sweeps" or "Macu-pane soque" meaning "place where the priest goes". The name of the city could have come from the combination of the names of Marcos and Juana, the alleged founders of the city.

== History ==
The region was earlier known as "El Tortuguero" with traces of Mayan civilization from the sixth to ninth centuries CE. Macuspana was elevated to city status in 1930, and the municipality was established on 4 May 1946.

== Geography ==
Macuspana is one of the 17 municipalities in the Mexican state of Tabasco in Mexico. It is located in the Usumacinta region, about 45 km (28 mi) from Villahermosa, the capital of Tabasco. It shares borders with the municipality of Jonuta in the east, Centro, Centla, and Jonuta in the north, Tacotalpa in the south, and Tacotalpa, Jalapa and Centro in the west. It is spread over an area of 2,429 km^{2} (938 sq mi), and has an average elevation of 10 m (33 ft). It is located in the Chilapa River basin, and is watered by the Tepetitan, Puxcatán, Tulijá, and Maluco rivers.

Macusapana has a hot and humid climate with an average annual temperature of 23.6 °C (74.5 °F). The months of April and May are the hottest, accompanied by rainfall.

The municipality has its seat at the city of Macuspana, and includes 15 villages, 129 rancherías, 20 ejidos, and 12 rural colonies apart from the city.

== Demographics ==
The municipality had a population of 142,954 as of the 2005 census. It increased to 158,601 in the 2020 census. The population consisted of 77,531 males and 81,070 females. About 28% of the population was below the age of fourteen. The municipality had a literacy rate of 94.5%. Roman Catholics (75%) formed the majority of the population. About 96.3% of the population were born locally.
