= Municipalities of Tabasco =

List of municipalities of Mexican state

Map of Mexico with Tabasco highlighted

Tabasco is a state in southeast Mexico that is divided into 17 municipalities. According to the 2020 INEGI census], it has the 20th largest population with 2,402,598 inhabitants and is the 24th largest by land area spanning 24,738 square kilometres (9,551 sq mi).

Municipalities in Tabasco are administratively autonomous of the state according to the 115th article of the 1917 Constitution of Mexico. Every three years, citizens elect a municipal president (Spanish: presidente municipal), by a plurality voting system, who heads a concurrently elected municipal council (ayuntamiento) which is responsible for providing all the public services for their constituents. The municipal council consists of a variable number of trustees and councillors (regidores y síndicos). Municipalities are responsible for public services (such as water and sewerage), street lighting, public safety, traffic, and the maintenance of public parks, gardens and cemeteries. They may also assist the state and federal governments in education, emergency fire and medical services, environmental protection and maintenance of monuments and historical landmarks. Since 1984, they have had the power to collect property taxes and user fees, although more funds are obtained from the state and federal governments than from their own income.

The largest municipality by population is Centro, with 683,607 residents while the smallest is Jonuta with 30,798 residents. The largest municipality by land area is Huimanguillo which spans 3,729.69 km^{2} (1,440.04 sq mi), and the smallest is Jalpa de Méndez with 370.83 km^{2} (143.18 sq mi). Tabasco has kept the same number of municipalities since 1883, one of the few Mexican states without recent changes.

== Municipalities ==
Largest municipalities in Tabasco by population

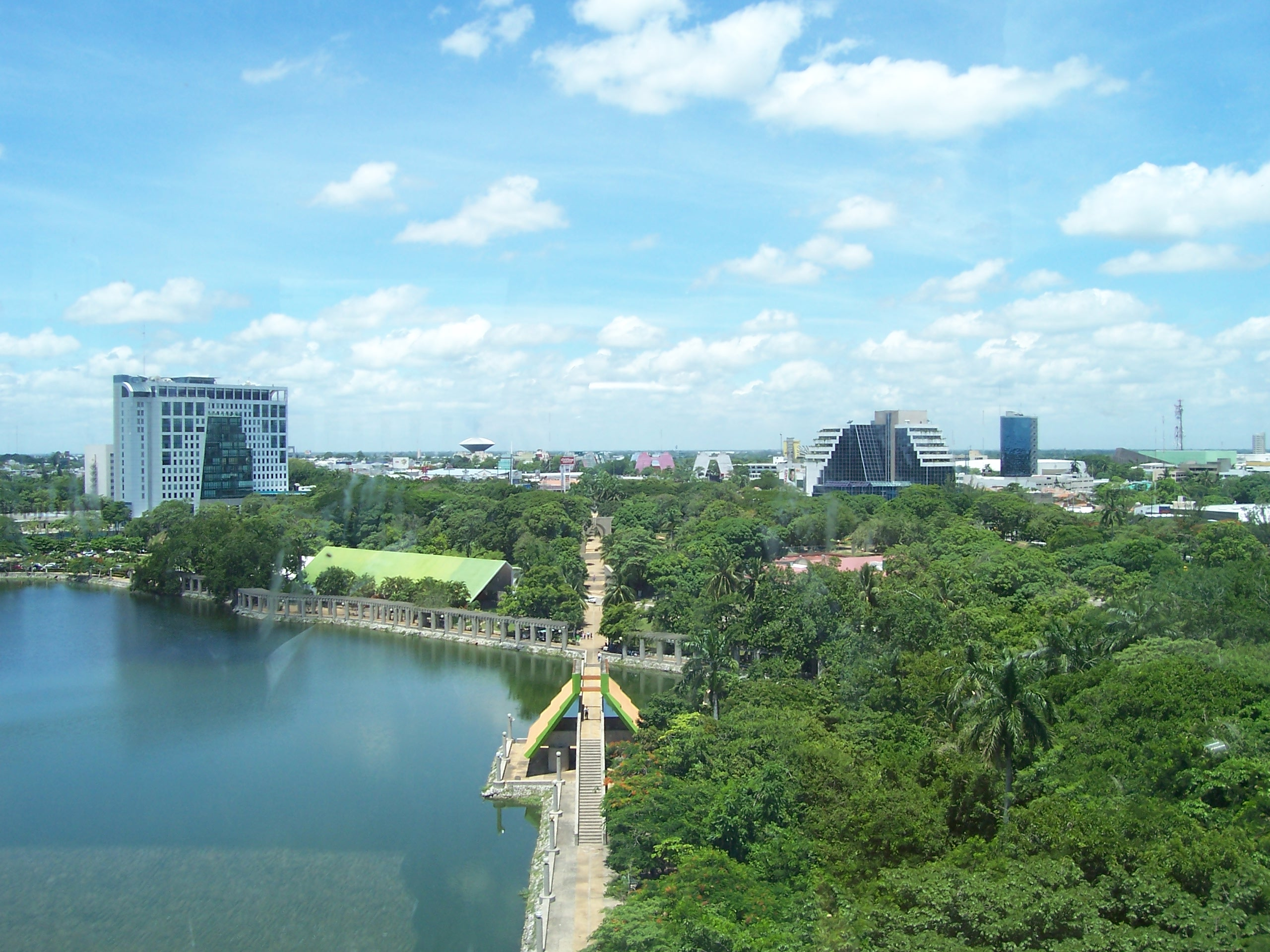
Centro, largest municipality by population in Tabasco

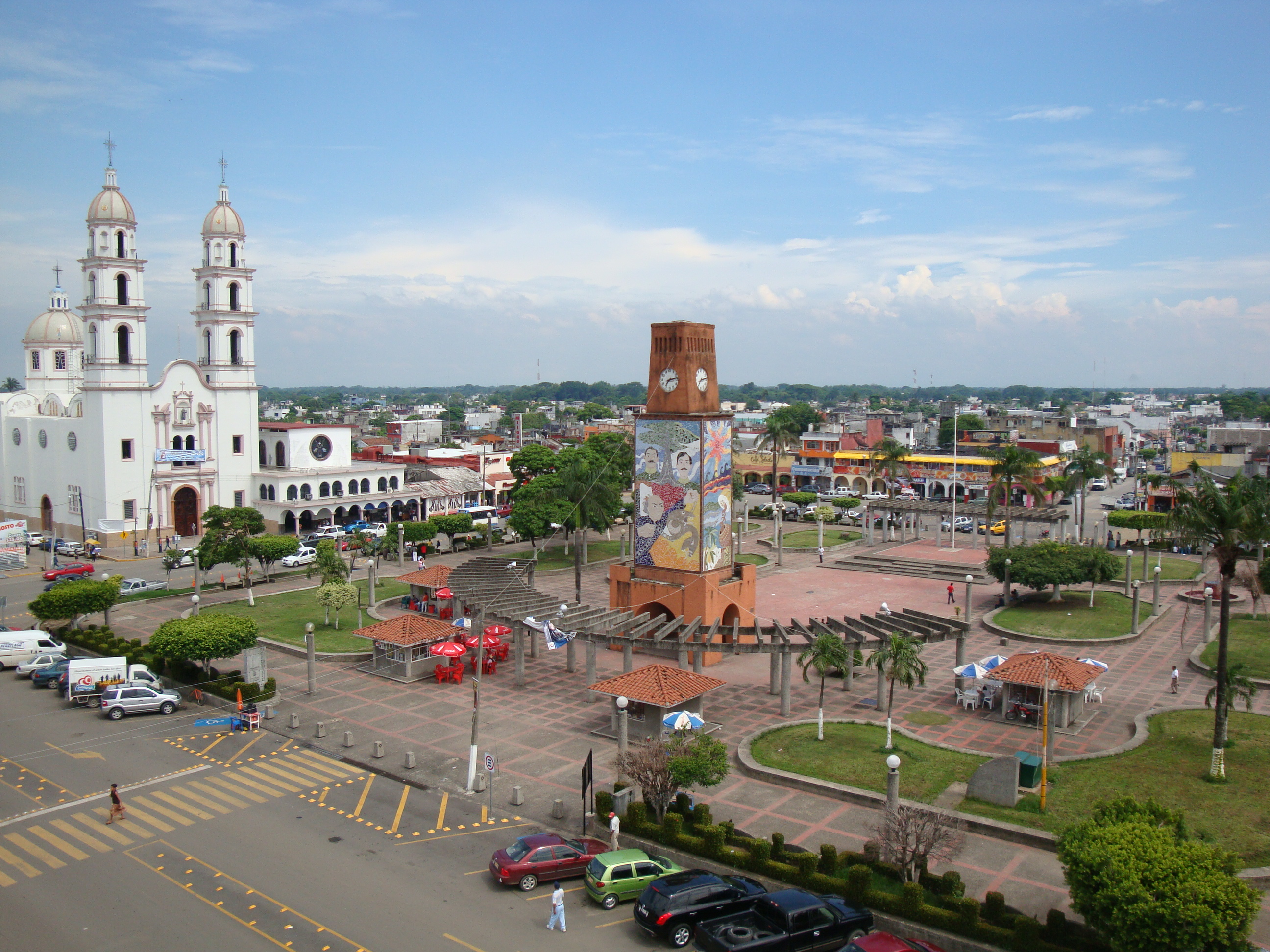
Cárdenas, second largest municipality by population

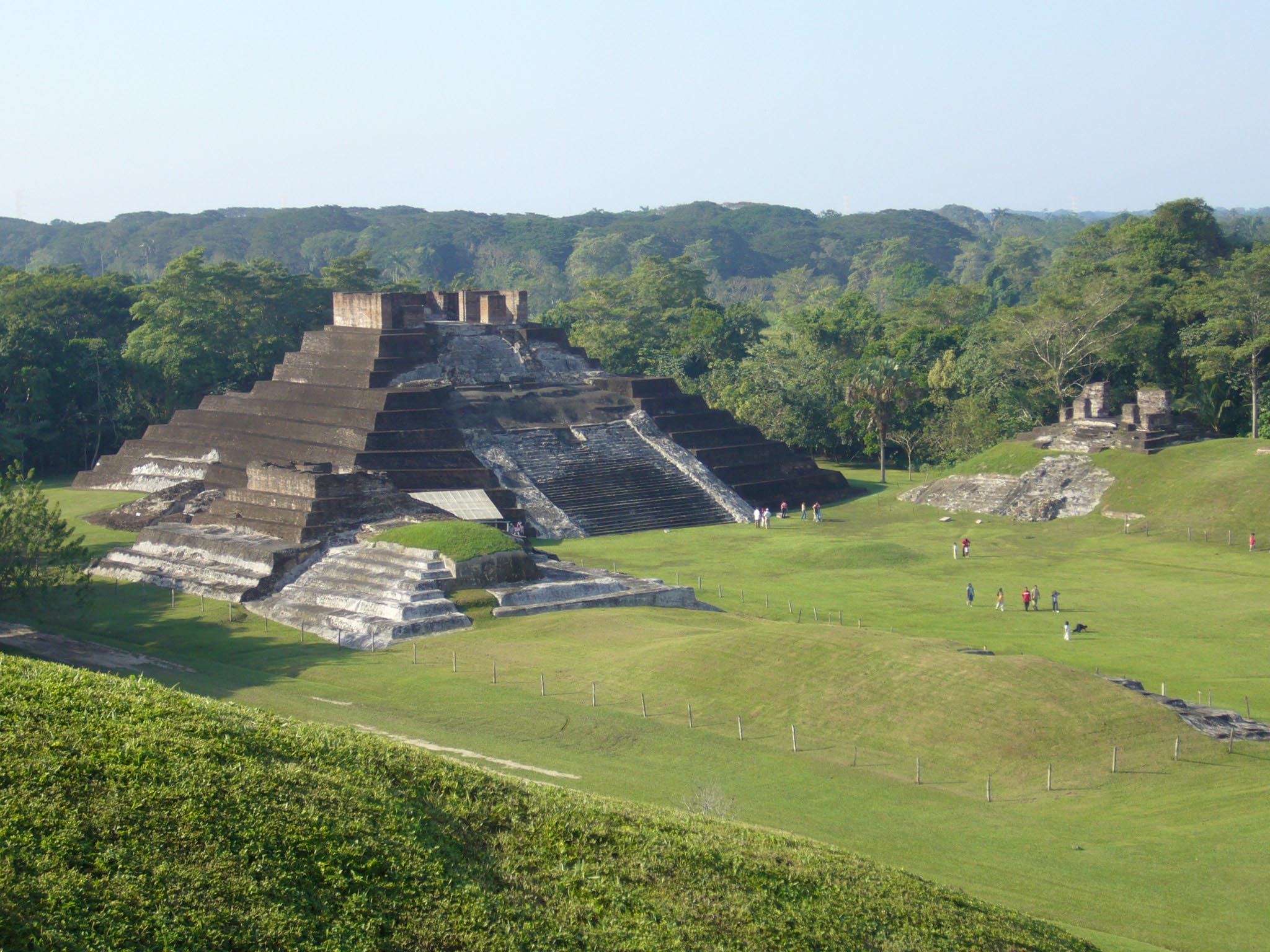
Comalcalco, third largest municipality by population

† State capital

Municipalities of Tabasco
Name	Municipal seat	Population (2020)	Population (2010)	Change	Land area		Population density (2020)	Incorporation date
Name	Municipal seat	Population (2020)	Population (2010)	Change	km^{2}	sq mi	Population density (2020)	Incorporation date
Balancán	Balancán	58,524	56,739	+3.1%	3,588.92	1,385.69	16.3/km^{2} (42.2/sq mi)	April 26, 1837
Cárdenas	Cárdenas	243,229	248,481	−2.1%	2,055.61	793.67	118.3/km^{2} (306.5/sq mi)	December 18, 1883
Centla	Frontera	107,731	102,110	+5.5%	2,701.85	1,043.19	39.9/km^{2} (103.3/sq mi)	December 18, 1883
Centro	Villahermosa†	683,607	640,359	+6.8%	1,723.38	665.40	396.7/km^{2} (1,027.4/sq mi)	February 5, 1825
Comalcalco	Comalcalco	214,877	102,110	+110.4%	770.67	297.56	278.8/km^{2} (722.1/sq mi)	November 14, 1834
Cunduacán	Cunduacán	137,257	126,416	+8.6%	600.58	231.88	228.5/km^{2} (591.9/sq mi)	February 5, 1825
Emiliano Zapata (Note: Emiliano Zapata was originally incorporated as Montecristo, changing its name on December 27, 1927.)	Emiliano Zapata	32,181	29,518	+9.0%	594.23	229.44	54.2/km^{2} (140.3/sq mi)	December 18, 1883
Huimanguillo	Huimanguillo	190,885	179,285	+6.5%	3,729.69	1,440.04	51.2/km^{2} (132.6/sq mi)	February 5, 1857
Jalapa	Jalapa	37,749	36,391	+3.7%	594.26	229.45	63.5/km^{2} (164.5/sq mi)	February 5, 1825
Jalpa de Méndez	Jalpa de Méndez	91,185	83,356	+9.4%	370.83	143.18	245.9/km^{2} (636.9/sq mi)	February 5, 1825
Jonuta	Jonuta	30,798	29,511	+4.4%	1,650.18	637.14	18.7/km^{2} (48.3/sq mi)	June 30, 1842
Macuspana	Macuspana	158,601	153,132	+3.6%	2,436.89	940.89	65.1/km^{2} (168.6/sq mi)	February 5, 1825
Nacajuca	Nacajuca	150,300	115,066	+30.6%	536.87	207.29	280.0/km^{2} (725.1/sq mi)	February 5, 1825
Paraíso	Paraíso	96,741	86,620	+11.7%	409.33	158.04	236.3/km^{2} (612.1/sq mi)	December 18, 1883
Tacotalpa	Tacotalpa	47,905	46,302	+3.5%	737.00	284.56	65.0/km^{2} (168.3/sq mi)	February 5, 1825
Teapa	Teapa	58,718	53,555	+9.6%	422.18	163.00	139.1/km^{2} (360.2/sq mi)	February 5, 1825
Tenosique	Tenosique	62,310	58,960	+5.7%	1,888.53	729.16	33.0/km^{2} (85.5/sq mi)	December 18, 1883
Tabasco	—	2,402,598	2,238,603	+7.3%	24,738	9,551.40	97.1/km^{2} (251.5/sq mi)	—
Mexico	—	126,014,024	112,336,538	+12.2%	1,972,550	761,606	63.9/km^{2} (165.5/sq mi)	—
