= 5th federal electoral district of Tabasco =

Federal electoral district of Mexico

Tabasco's 5th
- Electoral district of the Chamber of Deputies of Mexico

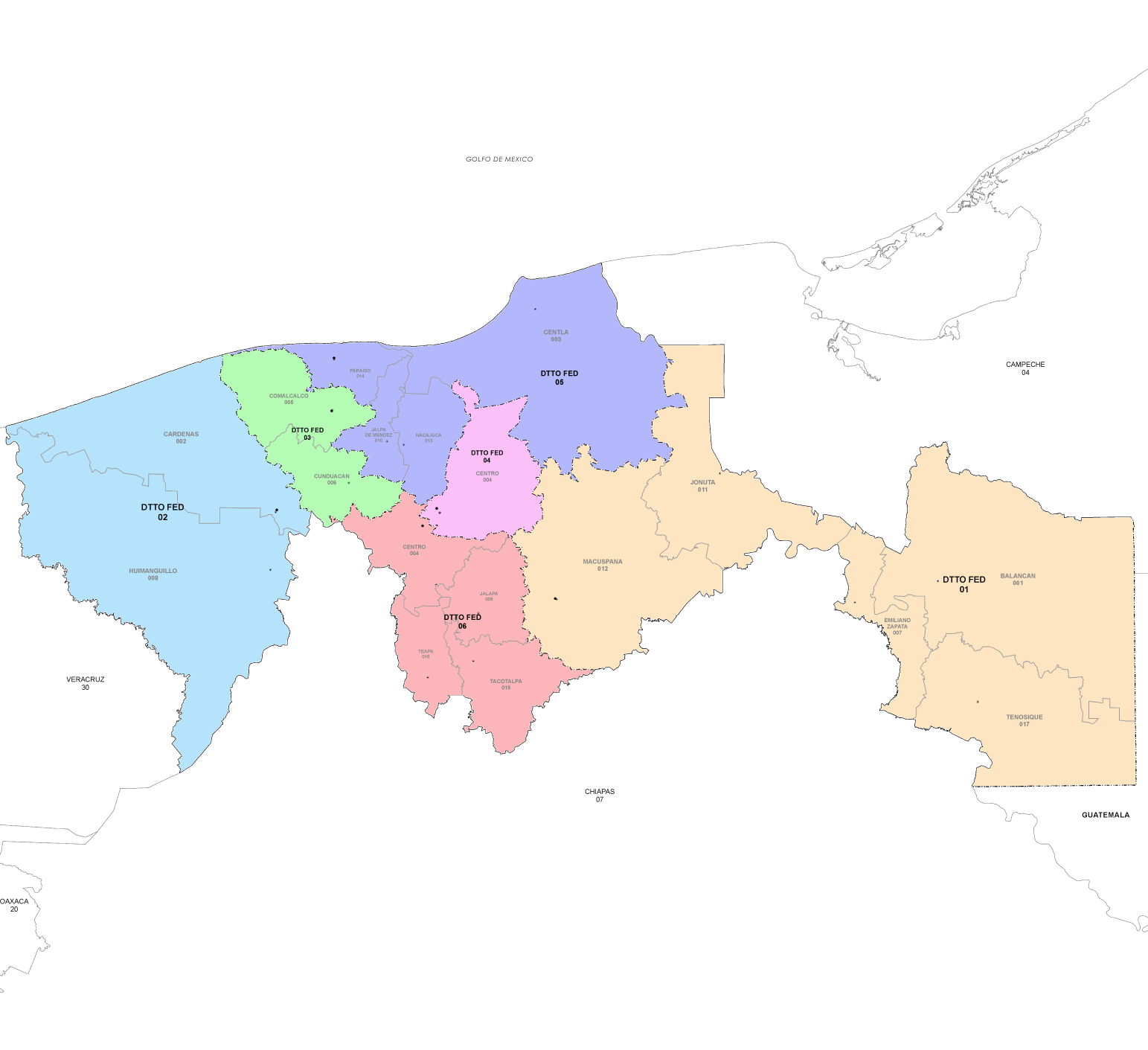
- 5th district

Incumbent
- Member: Beatriz Milland Pérez
- Party: ▌Morena
- Congress: 66th (2024–2027)

District
- State: Tabasco
- Head town: Paraíso
- Coordinates: 18°24′N 93°13′W
- Covers: Centla, Jalpa de Méndez, Nacajuca, Paraíso
- PR region: Third
- Precincts: 194
- Population: 447,988 (2020 census)
- Indigenous: Yes (41%)

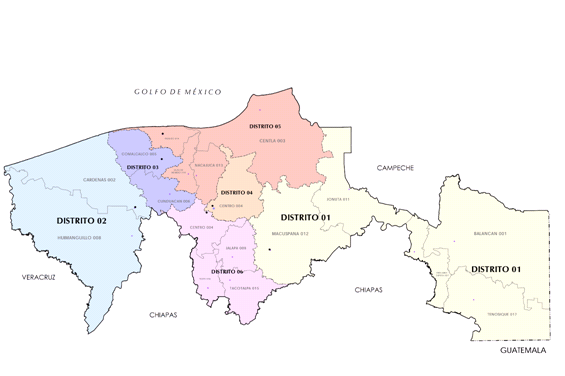
Tabasco's districts in 2017–2022

The 5th federal electoral district of Tabasco (Spanish: Distrito electoral federal 05 de Tabasco) is one of the 300 electoral districts into which Mexico is divided for elections to the federal Chamber of Deputies and one of six such districts in the state of Tabasco.

It elects one deputy to the lower house of Congress for each three-year legislative session by means of the first-past-the-post system. Votes cast in the district also count towards the calculation of proportional representation ("plurinominal") deputies elected from the third region.

Tabasco's 5th was created as part of the 1977 political reforms, which increased the number of single-member seats in the Chamber of Deputies from 196 to 300. Under that plan, Tabasco's seat allocation rose from three to five. The new district returned its first deputy in the 1979 mid-term election.

The current member for the district, elected in the 2024 general election, is Beatriz Milland Pérez of the National Regeneration Movement (Morena).

== District territory ==
Under the 2023 districting plan adopted by the National Electoral Institute (INE), which is to be used for the 2024, 2027 and 2030 federal elections, Tabasco's 5th district is in the located along the Gulf of Mexico coastline and covers 194 electoral precincts (secciones electorales) across four of the state's municipalities:

- Centla, Jalpa de Méndez, Nacajuca and Paraíso.

The head town (cabecera distrital), where results from individual polling stations are gathered together and tallied, is the city of Paraíso. The district reported a population of 447,988 in the 2020 census and, with Indigenous and Afrodescendent inhabitants accounting for over 41% of that total, it is classified by the INE as an indigenous district. (Note: Total inhabitants, not voters. The INE deems any local or federal electoral district where Indigenous or Afrodescendent inhabitants number 40% or more of the population to be an indigenous district.)

== Previous districting schemes ==
Evolution of electoral district numbers
	1974	1978	1996	2005	2017	2023
Tabasco	3	5	6	6	6	6
Chamber of Deputies	196	300				

2017–2022

From 2017 to 2022, the district had the same configuration as in the 2023 plan.

2005–2017

Under the 2005 plan, the district had the same configuration as in the 2017 and 2023 schemes.

1996–2005

Tabasco gained its 6th district in the 1996 redistricting process. The 5th covered the south of the state, comprising the municipalities of Macuspana (head town), Jalapa, Teapa and Tacotalpa.

1978–1996

The districting scheme in force from 1978 to 1996 was the result of the 1977 electoral reforms, which increased the number of single-member seats in the Chamber of Deputies from 196 to 300. Under that plan, Tabasco's seat allocation rose from three to five. The new 5th district's head town was at Macuspana and it comprised the same four municipalities as in the 1996 scheme.

== Deputies returned to Congress ==
(Mexico) National parties
- Current
- PAN
- PRI
- PT
- PVEM
- MC
- Morena
- PAZ
- Somos
- Defunct or local only
- PLM
- PNR
- PRM
- PNM
- PP
- PPS
- PARM
- PFCRN
- CON
- PANAL
- PSD
- PES
- PES
- PRD

Tabasco's 5th district
Election	Deputy	Party	Term	Legislature
1979	Hernán Rabelo Wade	Institutional Revolutionary Party	1979–1982	51st Congress
1982	Griselda García Serra	Institutional Revolutionary Party	1982–1985	52nd Congress
1985	Óscar Llergo Heredia	Institutional Revolutionary Party	1985–1988	53rd Congress
1988	Fredi Chable Torrano	Institutional Revolutionary Party	1988–1991	54th Congress
1991	Gladys Esther Guadalupe Cano Conde	Institutional Revolutionary Party	1991–1994	55th Congress
1994	Óscar Cantón Zetina	Institutional Revolutionary Party	1994–1997	56th Congress
1997	Víctor Manuel López Cruz	Institutional Revolutionary Party	1997–2000	57th Congress
2000	Feliciano Calzada Padrón	Institutional Revolutionary Party	2000–2003	58th Congress
2003	Carlos Manuel Rovirosa Ramírez	Institutional Revolutionary Party	2003–2006	59th Congress
2006	Silbestre Álvarez Ramón	Party of the Democratic Revolution	2006–2009	60th Congress
2009	Nicolás Carlos Bellizia Aboaf	Institutional Revolutionary Party	2009–2012	61st Congress
2012	Marcos Rosendo Medina Filigrana	Party of the Democratic Revolution	2012–2015	62nd Congress
2015	Araceli Madrigal Sánchez	Party of the Democratic Revolution	2015–2018	63rd Congress
2018	Laura Patricia Ávalos Magaña	National Regeneration Movement	2018–2021	64th Congress
2021	Janicie Contreras García	National Regeneration Movement	2021–2024	65th Congress
2024	Beatriz Milland Pérez	National Regeneration Movement	2024–2027	66th Congress

=== Results ===
The corresponding page on the Spanish-language Wikipedia contains results of the congressional elections since 2006.

== Presidential elections ==
Tabasco's 5th district
Election	District won by	Party or coalition	%
2018	Andrés Manuel López Obrador	Juntos Haremos Historia	82.3489
2024	Claudia Sheinbaum Pardo	Sigamos Haciendo Historia	82.4282
