= Carlos Valenzuela Cabrales =

Mexican politician

Carlos Alberto Valenzuela Cabrales (Jonuta, Tabasco; July 17, 1955) is a Mexican politician, member of the National Action Party (PAN). He graduated as a surgeon from the National Autonomous University of Mexico and studied a postgraduate degree in Public Policy at the Autonomous Technological Institute of Mexico.

== Political career ==
The former Mexican official has served in various public positions such as Federal Deputy of the LVIII Legislature of the Congress of the Union of Mexico, local deputy of the LVI Legislature of the Congress of Tabasco, and Councilman of the City Council of the Municipality of Centro (Tabasco). He was also a candidate for the Mexican Senate in the 2006 election and pre-candidate of the National Action Party for the government of the State of Tabasco in the 2012 election.
