= Chontal Maya =

Chontal
Total population
- 60,000

Regions with significant populations
- Mexico (Tabasco)

Languages
- Chontal Maya, Spanish

Religion
- Catholicism, Maya religion

Related ethnic groups
- Ch'ol, other Maya peoples

The Chontal Maya are a Maya people of the Mexican state of Tabasco. "Chontal", from the Nahuatl word for chontalli, which means "foreigner", has been applied to various ethnic groups in Mexico. The Chontal refer to themselves as the Yokot'anob or the Yokot'an, meaning "the speakers of Yoko ochoco", but writers about them refer to them as the Chontal of Centla, the Tabasco Chontal, or in Spanish, Chontales. They consider themselves the descendants of the Olmecs, and are not related to the Oaxacan Chontal.

The historical term Putún is typically considered a synonym for the Chontal Maya.

== Location ==
The Yokot'an inhabit 21 towns in a large area known as "la Chontalpa" that extends across five municipalities of Tabasco: Centla, El Centro, Jonuta, Macuspana, and Nacajuca. In Nacajuca, they form a majority of the population. The terrain is highly varied — no single landform dominates — and it has many bodies of water. The land is traversed by seasonally-flooding rivers, and there are numerous lakes, lagoons, and wetlands. The climate is humid and tropical, and the fauna was typical of tropical regions until the environment was altered by human industrialization. The mangrove is the predominant form of vegetation.

== History ==
The territory of the Yokot'an was the cradle of the Olmec civilization, which lived there from about 1400 BCE until about 400 BCE. The Maya civilization reached its height in about 300 CE. At this time, the Yokot'an were also at their cultural apex. They had already begun to decline by the time of the Spanish conquest of Yucatán, and are mentioned in the narratives of Bernal Díaz del Castillo and Hernán Cortés.

In the early 16th century, the Yokot'an were divided into six provinces: Acalan (immediately to the east of the Laguna de Términos, Copilco (the westernmost province, including Nacajuca), Ixtapa-Usumacinta (in southeastern Tabasco), Potonchán, Xicalango (including the mainland to the southwest as far as Jonuta), and Zahuatan-Chilapa (around Jalapa and Macuspana). The Yokot'an were known as merchants who travelled by canoe, and their homeland was a center of trade attracting merchants from throughout Mesoamerica, including larger mutually hostile powers who took advantage of its location in neutral ground. Potonchan and Jalapa were by far the most populous Yokot'an urban centers, with a population of about 13,000 each. With the exception of Acalan, the major economic product was cacao, especially in Copilco. Fish, fruit and maize were also plentiful. Nahuas also lived throughout the region, particularly in Xicalango, and often formed a significant portion of the ruling classes, though ultimately a minority in contrast to the areas to the west such as Coatzacoalcos.

In 1518, Juan de Grijalva arrived in Yokot'an lands, and was greeted with hostility. The next year, Cortés's expedition reached Tabasco, and he met with Tabscoob and other chiefs, who supplied him the translator who later became known as Doña Marina or La Malinche. According to Díaz,

“Before we left, Cortés won the chiefs by his many kind words, telling them how our master, the Emperor, had many grand lords who gave him obedience and that they should also obey him; that whatever they might need we would give them. All the chiefs thanked him very much and declared themselves vassals of our great emperor, the first in New Spain to give obedience to His Majesty.”

In 1614, the first church was built in Nacajuca, then considered the center of the Yokot'an world. Nacajuca was the only urban center to survive the colonial period, partly due to the introduction of animal husbandry, which limited the range of cultivation.

== Economy ==
The traditional economy is based on agriculture, fishing, the raising of livestock, and the hunting of small game. In the Terminal Classic period Chontal Maya merchants controlled river and coastal trade routes in the Maya lowlands. Another source of income is palm-wood artisanry. In the past, the manufacture of oyster-shell lime for mortar was an important economic activity, but the availability of mass-produced building materials has reduced demand to the point where its production is no longer profitable.

=== Agriculture ===
The agriculture of the Yokot'an has been studied extensively and has been shown to be related to ancient Maya agrarian methods. They cultivate high-altitude lands that are enriched with mineral-rich loam by flooding. The principal crop is maize. Agriculture has been in decline since the Spanish conquest of Mexico, when animal husbandry was introduced. Maize, beans, and squash are planted seasonally.

=== Fishing ===
While fishing may have been as an important part of the Yokot'an economy as agriculture in Pre-Columbian times, today, due to environmental degradation, it doesn't have the same importance. The people continue, however, to fish, especially during periods of abundance. There are three main groups of fishermen. The "libre" ("free") fishermen use very simple "hoop and basket" technology and work in small groups led by an elected "boss". Members of official cooperatives enjoy the benefits of official organization, but are often underpaid. The third group consists of well-equipped business owners who work with contractors.

=== Livestock ===
The raising of livestock, unlike fishing, is a growing sector of the economy, often at the expense of agriculture. Many shallow lagoons formerly used for fishing have been drained for use as pastureland.

=== Hunting ===
The Yoko'tan hunt game such as the White-tailed deer, but small game has much more importance.

=== Crafts ===
Hats are woven from palm and sleeping mats called petates are woven from the fibers of cañita, the Cyperus giganteus, but the primary craft of the Yoko'tan people is the dugout canoe and its smaller counterpart, the cayuco, which is used for fishing and to reach the many islands used for planting.

== Culture ==
=== Housing ===
Traditional houses are rectangular in shape, made of palm, wood and are supported by six to eight posts. The roofs are steep to minimize the effect of the heavy rains, and are built by hired professionals. Houses tend to be surrounded by overhangs for outdoor work. Kitchen work is generally done in under one of these awnings. One modern element of house construction that has been incorporated is the use of nails.

=== Family ===
The Yoko'tan family is nuclear, monogamous, and cohesive. There is a tendency to marry young, and gender roles are specifically defined. Nonetheless, women are accorded more respect in traditional villages than in villages with high mestizo populations.

=== Religion ===
The original mythology and cosmogony of the Yokot'an is only beginning to be studied. Their myths are filled with supernatural water- and mangrove-creatures, and the story of La Llorona is also told.

Public religious displays center around feast days due the adoption of the Catholic faith. The most important feasts are of Our Lady of Mount Carmel, the Immaculate Conception (December 8), and the Archangel Michael (September 29). April 29 is celebrated for the flood season.

During the 1980s, the Catholic Church sought to decrease the influence of Protestant missionaries, who had established themselves in the region as stalwarts against alcoholism and la costumbre, or traditional Maya religious practices.

In response, the Catholic Church formed groups of neighborhood catechists to take a hardline stance. They gave Catholic studies of the Gospel, discouraged the making of ofrendas (dedications to saints upon the building or purchase of a new house). They even discouraged music and dance.

This strong Catholic stance against la costumbre prompted a general withdrawal of the people from service to the Church and the decentralization of feast day celebration. Now the feasts are celebrated privately, among the family.

=== Language ===
Most Yoko'tan are bilingual. Yoko ochoco was in danger of dying out, but flourished in the 1980s after official preservation efforts.

=== Environmental ===
Environmental decline began with the draining of shallow lakes for pastureland when the raising of livestock was introduced. Land formerly used for cultivation was also used for grazing. More recently, Pemex has extensively polluted the waters of northern Tabasco and caused other ecologically-threatening changes such as altering the water's salinity. Some species have been driven to extinction and others have abandoned the affected habitats, reducing the average catch. The mangrove has receded and has thus been able to provide fewer forest resources. These actions have spurred local peoples movements against Pemex and their contractors.

=== Social and economic ===
The environmental degradation has driven many Yokot'an, especially men, to urban centers for employment. As a result, family cohesion has suffered and traditions, especially those pertaining to the traditional economy, are not as well preserved. There is also a major alcoholism problem caused by difficulty adapting to mainstream Mexican society and the comparative wealth experienced by recent arrivals to the cities.

== See also ==
- Putún
- Tabasco (former state)
- Chontalpa
- Potonchan
- Itzamkanac
- Acalan
- Comalcalco (archaeological site)

== Sources ==
- (in Spanish) Incháustegui, Carlos. Chontales de Centla: el impacto del proceso de modernización. Villahermoso, Tabasco: Instituto de Cultura de Tabasco, 1985. ISBN 968-889-001-4
- (in Spanish) Incháustegui, Carlos. "Chontales de Tabasco / Yokot'anob o Yokot'an", part of the Instituto Nacional Indigenista's Pueblos Indígenas de México monograph series
