= Tepetitán =

Tepetitán is the name of several places

- Tepetitán, El Salvador, in the département of San Vicente in El Salvador
- Tepetitán, Tabasco, in the state of Tabasco in Mexico
