= Carlos Manuel Rovirosa Ramírez =

Mexican politician (born 1953)

- Born: 19 May 1953 (age 73); Macuspana, Tabasco, Mexico
- Occupation: Politician
- Political party: PRI

Carlos Manuel Rovirosa Ramírez (born 19 May 1953) is a Mexican politician affiliated with the Institutional Revolutionary Party (PRI). In the 2003 mid-terms he was elected to the Chamber of Deputies to represent Tabasco's 5th district during the 59th session of Congress.
