= Nicolás Bellizia Aboaf =

Mexican politician (born 1969)

Nicolás Carlos Bellizia Aboaf
- Born: 19 November 1969 (age 56); Centla, Tabasco, Mexico
- Occupation: Politician
- Political party: PRI

Nicolás Carlos Bellizia Aboaf (born 19 November 1969) is a Mexican politician from the Institutional Revolutionary Party (PRI). In the 2009 mid-terms he was elected to the Chamber of Deputies to represent Tabasco's 5th district during the 61st session of Congress.
