= Óscar Cantón Zetina =

Mexican politician

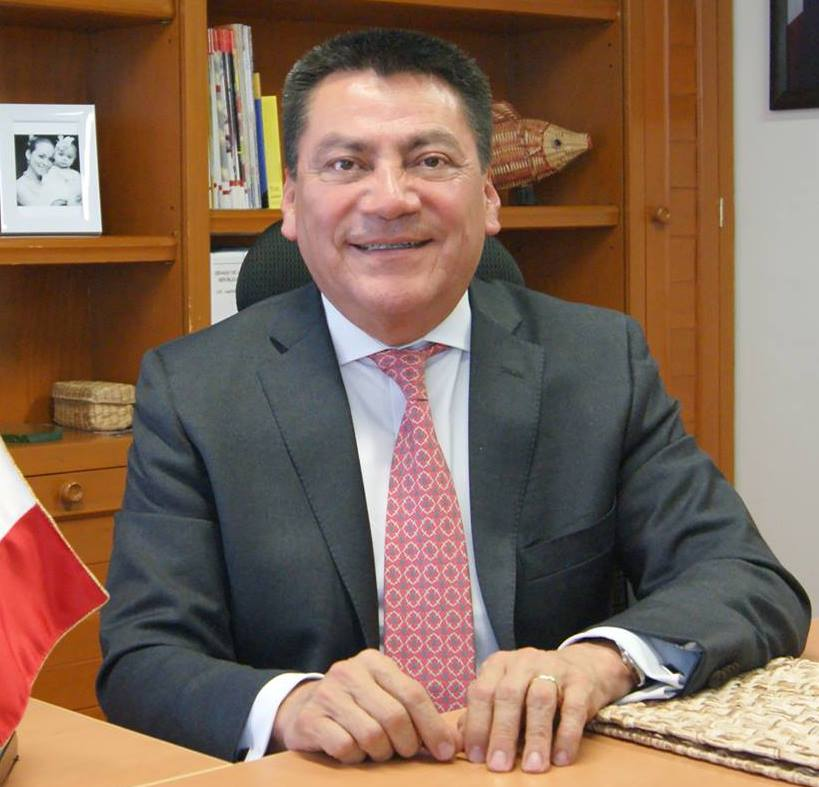
- Born: 1 August 1953 (age 73); Centro, Tabasco, Mexico
- Education: National Autonomous University of Mexico
- Occupation: Politician
- Political party: PRI (1975–2006); PRD (2006–present)

Óscar Cantón Zetina (born 1 August 1953) is a Mexican politician affiliated with the National Regeneration Movement (Morena) who previously belonged to both the Party of the Democratic Revolution (PRD) and the Institutional Revolutionary Party (PRI).

Cantón Zetina served as a PRI senator for Tabasco in the 54th, 55th, 58th and 59th Congresses (1988–1994 and 2000–2006).

He also served as a PRI federal deputy for Tabasco's 2nd district in the 52nd Congress (1982–1985), and for Tabasco's 5th district in the 56th Congress (1994–1997).

He won election as one of Tabasco's senators in the 2024 Senate election, occupying the second place on Morena's two-name formula.
