= Silbestre Álvarez Ramón =

Mexican politician

- Born: 12 August 1967 (age 59); Tabasco, Mexico
- Occupation: Politician
- Political party: PRD

Silbestre Álvarez Ramón (born 12 August 1967) is a Mexican politician from the Party of the Democratic Revolution (PRD). In the 2006 general election he was elected to the Chamber of Deputies to represent Tabasco's 5th district during the 60th session of Congress. He also served as a local deputy in the 58th session of the Congress of Tabasco and as municipal president of Nacajuca.
