= Chontales =

Chontales may refer to:

- Chontales Department, Nicaragua
- Chontal Maya people, Tabasco, Mexico
