= Marcos Rosendo Medina Filigrana =

Mexican politician

- Born: 6 October 1970 (age 55); Jalpa, Tabasco, Mexico
- Occupation: Politician
- Political party: PRD, Morena

Marcos Rosendo Medina Filigrana (born 6 October 1970) is a Mexican politician. He has been affiliated with both the Party of the Democratic Revolution (PRD) and the National Regeneration Movement (Morena).

He has been elected to the Chamber of Deputies on two occasions: in the 2012 general election (62nd Congress), for Tabasco's 5th district, on the PRD ticket; and in the 2021 mid-terms (65th Congress), for Tabasco's 1st district, as a member of Morena.
