= Tepetitán, Tabasco =

- Town
- Location within Tabasco Location within Mexico Location within North America
- Coordinates: 17.819°N 92.373°W
- Country: Mexico
- State: Tabasco
- Municipality: Macuspana

Population
  - Total: 1,522
- Time zone: CST

Tepetitán is one of the two most important towns of the Macuspana Municipality, Tabasco in Mexico and one of the 19 regional development centers where most of the municipality's economic and social activities occur. It is the oldest settlement in the municipality and in the vicinity there is a river. Its population is 1,522 inhabitants and it is about 23 miles (37 km) from the municipal seat.

== Early beginnings ==
During an expedition of conquistador Hernán Cortés between 1524 and 1525, the conqueror mentioned having passed through a town called Tepetitlán, which could have been the present town of Tepetitán.

== 19th century ==
The town was the core of the insurrection of the Macuspana uprising against the centralist government in the year 1840, rebelling against the government of General José Ignacio Gutiérrez (es) in Tabasco.

== Economic activity ==
There are two oil wells and the main economic activities are agriculture, livestock and fishing.

== Notable people ==
Tepetitán is the birthplace of Andrés Manuel López Obrador, the President of Mexico from 2018-2024.
