= Juan Manuel Fócil Pérez =

Mexican politician

Senator for Tabasco
- Incumbent
- Assumed office 1 September 2018
- Preceded by: Humberto Mayans Canabal

Personal details
- Born: 12 June 1963 (age 63) Villahermosa, Tabasco, Mexico
- Party: PRD
- Occupation: Politician

Juan Manuel Fócil Pérez (born 12 June 1963) is a Mexican politician affiliated with the Party of the Democratic Revolution (PRD). He is a native of Villahermosa, Tabasco.

In 2012–2015 he served as a plurinominal deputy in the 62nd Congress, representing the third electoral region, which includes his home state of Tabasco. In the 2018 general election he was elected to the Senate, representing the state of Tabasco for the 2018–2024 term.

Fócil Pérez contended for the governorship of Tabasco in the 2 June 2024 election, representing the PRD. With 6.70% of the votes cast, he came in second place to Javier May Rodríguez of the National Regeneration Movement (Morena). To fight his gubernatorial campaign, he took leave of his Senate seat from 31 January to 3 June 2024 and was replaced by his alternate, Christian Gregorio Díaz Carrasco, during his absence.
