= Feliciano Calzada Padrón =

Mexican politician

- Born: 20 May 1941 (age 85); Teapa, Tabasco, Mexico
- Occupation: Politician
- Political party: PRI

Feliciano Calzada Padrón (born 20 May 1941) is a Mexican politician from the Institutional Revolutionary Party (PRI). In the 2000 general election he was elected to the Chamber of Deputies to represent Tabasco's 5th district during the 58th session of Congress.
