= Chilapa River =

Location
- Country: Mexico
- State: Guerrero

The Chilapa River is a river located in Guerrero, Mexico. It derives its name from the Nahuatl word chilapan, which translates roughly into "place on the river of chillies". The river runs through the municipality of Chilapa de Álvarez.

== See also ==
- List of rivers of Mexico
