= Cunduacán =

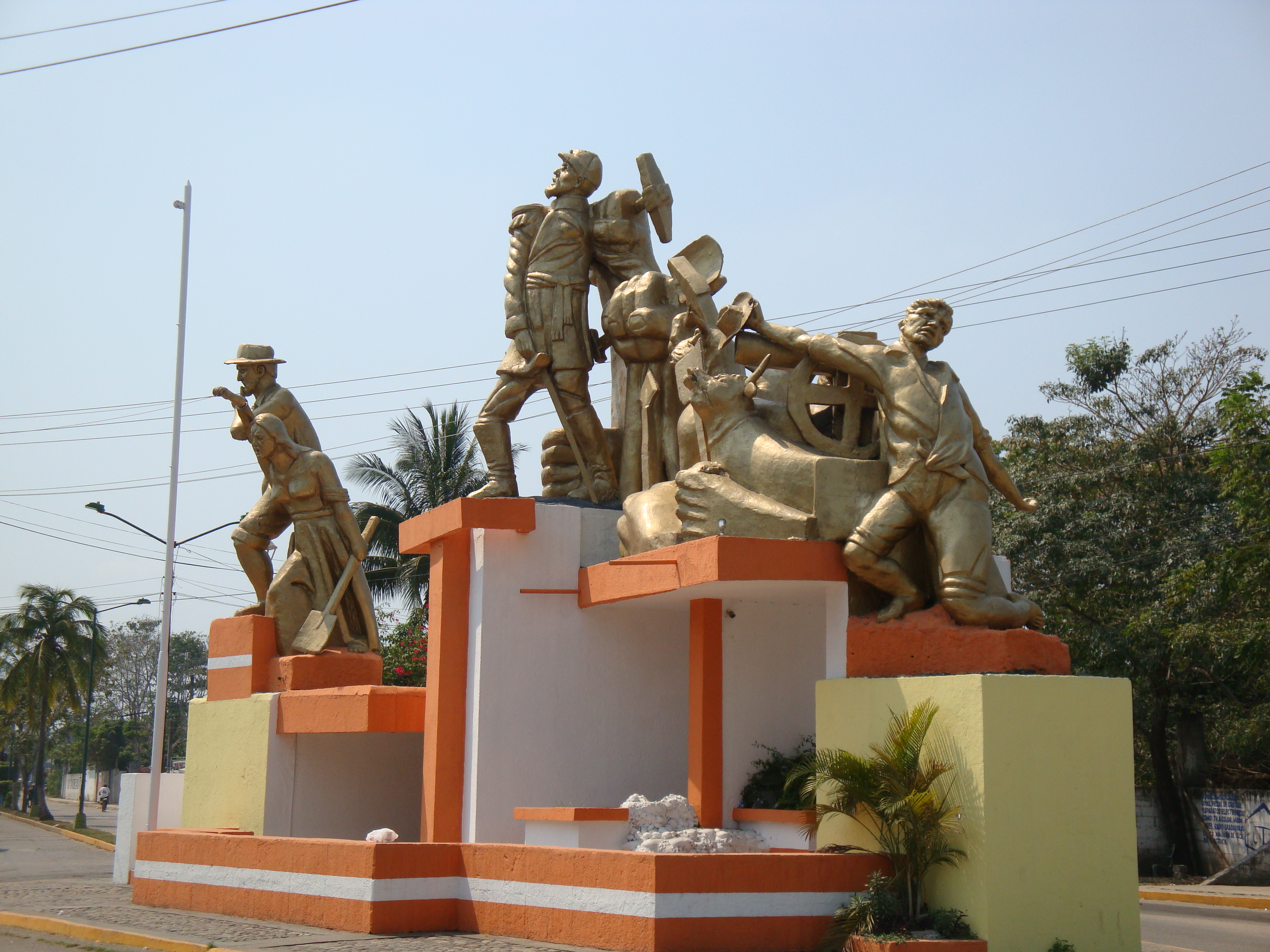

- Location of the municipality within Tabasco
- Coordinates: 18°4′0″N 93°10′0″W
- Country: Mexico
- State: Tabasco

Government
  - Federal electoral district: Tabasco's 3rd
- Time zone: UTC-6 (Zona Centro)

Cunduacán is a municipality in the central portion of the Mexican state of Tabasco. It is located at about 18°4'0"North, 93°10'0"West.

It is located in the Grijalva River Region, Chontalpa subregion. Its name originates from the Mayan cum-ua-cán, which means "place of pots of corn and serpents", which is also the name of the city which is the municipal seat of the municipality. It is made up of 10 villages, 31 ranches (rancherías), 59 ejidos and 13 colonias. The town had a 2005 census population of 81,392 inhabitants (the sixth-largest community in the state after Villahermosa, Cárdenas, and Comalcalco, Huimanguillo, and Macuspana), while the municipality had a population of 112,036 (www.inegi.gob.mx). The municipality has an area of 1,017 km^{2} (393 sq mi), the eighth in the state in terms of geographical coverage and corresponding to 2.54% of the total area of the state. To the North are the municipalities of Comalcalco and Jalpa de Méndez, to the East are the municipalities of Nacajuca and Centro, to the South is the municipality of Centro and the State of Chiapas, and to the West is the municipality of Cárdenas. Geophysically the municipality is completely flat, as it is part of the coastal plain. Its hydrography consists of the rivers Mezcalapa, which marks its southern border with the municipalities of Centro, Samaria, Guayabal, Cucuyulapa, Barí, Cunduacán and Tular; and the lagoons of Cucuyulapa and Ballona. The state's Universidad Juarez Autonoma de Tabasco has various centers in Cunduacán.

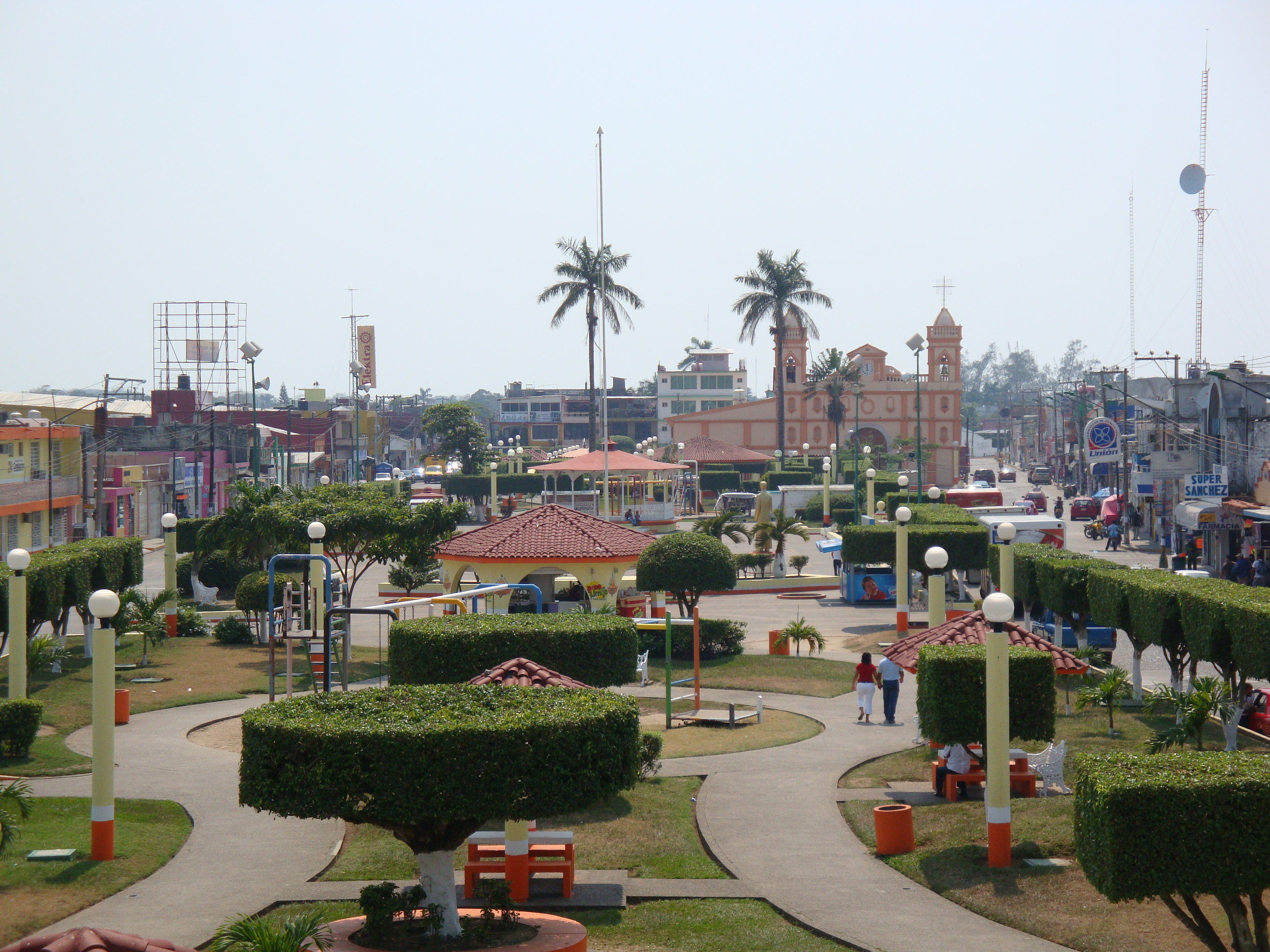
Cunduacan Town.
