= Nacajuca =

City in the Mexican state of Tabasco

Nacajuca Yäxtup (Yokot'an)
- City
- Nacajuca
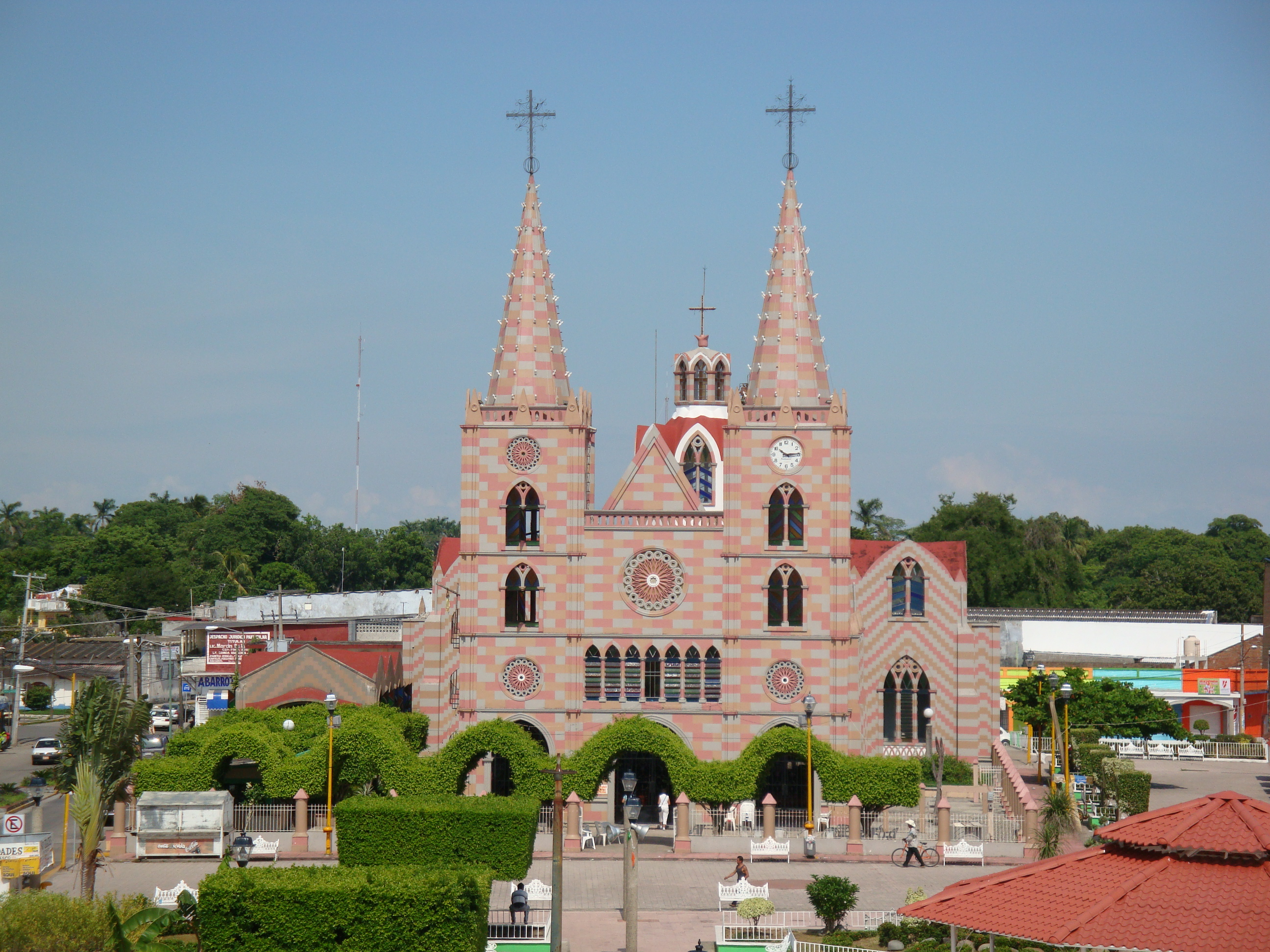
- San Antonio de Padua Church
- Interactive map of Nacajuca
- Coordinates: 18°10′09″N 93°01′11″W
- Country: Mexico
- State: Tabasco

Government
  - Municipal President: Marco Antonio Leyva
  - Federal electoral district: Tabasco's 5th
- Elevation (of seat): 10 m (33 ft)

Population (2010) Municipality
  - Municipality: 83,356
- Time zone: UTC-6 (Central)
- Postal code (of seat): 86220
- Website: nacajuca.gob.mx/index.cfm

Nacajuca (Yokot'an: Yäxtup) is a city in Nacajuca Municipality in the state of Tabasco, Mexico. It is part of the Chontalapa region in the north center of the state and a major center of Tabasco's Chontal Maya population. Although the local economy is still based on agriculture and livestock, oil production, handcrafts and some tourism are important aspects as well. The environment of the area is low-lying flat land susceptible to flooding including being hard hit by the 2007 Tabasco flood and more recent flooding in 2011.

== The city ==
The city of Nacajuca is located in the north of the state of Tabasco, Mexico, in the Chontalpa Region, 26 km from the state capital of Villahermosa. It is the seat for the municipality of the same name with all governmental functions thereof. It also is the location for most state and federal buildings and services as well. Its main economic activities are commerce and agriculture. It has a population of about 8,200 people.

The Parque Central Miguel Hidalgo (Miguel Hidalgo Central Park) marks the historic center of the city and is the site of most of its civic, cultural and recreational events. It has a modest kiosk in the center with a monument to Miguel Hidalgo in the southwest corner. It has walkways, garden areas with fig and coconut trees.

The San Antonio de Padua Temple is located facing the Hidalgo Park. The current construction dates to 1965 in mostly Gothic style. The main facade has three levels with a triangular crest. The facade is flanked by two towers with four levels and a spire decorated with doves, which support a metallic cross. The facade has pointed arches with three entrances, windows on the second level of the portal and the third and fourth levels of the towers. The third level of the portal has a rose window as well as the second level of the towers. Another is found on the north tower which the south tower has a clock. The interior has a basilica layout with the central nave higher than the side ones. This permits illumination from the windows in the center as well as the side windows.

== History ==
The name comes from Nahuatl and means “place of pale or discolored faces.” This name was given to the area by the Aztecs, who notice the pale complexion of most of the people here due to then prevalent malaria. The municipality's seal was created in 1998. It contains images related to the area's Chontal population, its wetlands environment with a snail speaking in the center. Underneath is the world “YIXTUP” which is its name in the Chontal language along with a legend that reads “People first, things after.”

The first culture to dominate the Nacajuca area was Mayan coming from what is now Chiapas and Guatemala, eventually establishing the main city in nearby Comalcalco. The settlements of the municipality have long histories with their names originally spelled Nacaxuxuca, Túcta, Mazateupa, Tapaucingo, Huatacalca, Tecoluta, Huaitalpa, Olcuatitlan and Ohicake.

The first Spanish arrived to the area in 1518 making contact with the Chontales here and other parts of the state of Tabasco. In 1524 and 1525, Hernán Cortés passed through on his way to what is now Honduras and commented on the area's abundant cacao in his letters to the Spanish Crown. The area was also mentioned by contemporary historian Bernal Díaz del Castillo, noticing that the local population had pale faces, generally due to the prevalence of malaria. In 1525, the Spanish Crown gifted a painting of the king to the village of Tucta in recognition of that community's alliance with the Spanish. Despite the early Spanish arrival, the area was not easily pacified, with Francisco de Montego trying and failing in 1528. However, the people of the village of Tucta eventually allied with the Spanish. The area was completely under Spanish control by 1550. After this year, the Spanish began to infiltrate and live in the villages of the municipality to established encomiendas and haciendas for the production of cacao and fruit.

In 1579, Melchor Alfaro of Nacajuca created a map and diary of Tabasco to be sent to the Spanish Crown. The first church and first royal treasury of Tabasco was built in the town in 1614. By 1665, the community's name was modified to Nacajuca and was the governmental authority for thirteen other communities.

By 1843, the town was known as San Pedro Nacajuca.

In 1844, volunteer companies were created headed by Manuel Antonio León, Francisco de Sentmanat y Sayas and Manuel Plasencia to fight off foreign invasion.

In 1852, the municipality was composed of the town of Nacajuca as seat along with the communities of, Mazateupa, Tapotzingo, Guatacalca, Tecoluta, Guaytalpa, Olcuatitán, Oxiacaque along with the farmland among them.

In 1863, Nacajuca was officially declared a town.

Telephone service began in the area in 1896, with an official office in the town. In 1906, a railroad linking the town with Cunduacán and Comalcalco was built.

In 1971, it was declared a city.

== Chontal Maya ==
Nacajuca is a major center of the state's Chontal Maya population, which principally live in the north-center of Tabasco. They call themselves “yoko yinikob” and “yoko ixikob” which mean true men and true women respectively. The name Chontal comes from Nahuatl and means “foreigner” originally how the Aztecs called them. Their language is of the Mayan family, which is descended from a language spoken in southeastern Mexico four thousand years ago. It belongs to the Ch’ol subgroup and further divides today into several mutually intelligible dialects. There are three main dialects, North, South and Tapotzingo, with North and Tapotzingo centered on the Nacajuca area. The number of speakers of Chontal Maya have been increasing since 1980 with about 60% of the ethnic population able to speak it at least somewhat. These speakers are almost always bilingual. One reason for this is the introduction of bilingual education in the 1970s.

According to the 2010 government census, there are 13,809 speakers of an indigenous language, and almost all indigenous language speakers (over 96%) are speakers of Chontal Maya. However, government census data, which only counts the number of Chontal speakers over the age of five, does not accurately reflect the size of the Chontal community. In 2000, the size of the ethnic Chontal Maya community was estimated at 36.9% of the total. Fourteen of the municipality's communities are considered to be primarily indigenous, another four predominantly indigenous and six with a large indigenous population. Those without strong indigenous presence number 38. Communities with a strong Chontal Maya presence include Tucta, Tapotzingo, Mazateupa, Guaytalpa, Tecoluta, Oxiacaque, Guatacalca, Olcuatitán, San Isidro, San Simón, El Sitio, Isla Guadalupe, El Tigre, Guanosolo and Saloya.

== Geography ==
The territory is flat with an elevation of about ten meters above sea level. There are no notable hills. Its low terrain makes it very vulnerable to flooding. During the 2007 floods, which affected 80% of the state with a million people affected, the city of Nacajuca and other communities on higher ground became affected. With roads washed out, small boats were used. This flood affected the entire municipality and destroyed or damaged many of the homes. Flooding from the Samaria River affected Chontal communities such as Guácimo, Pastal, Chcozapote, Guatacalca and Oxiacaque in the municipality in October 2011. Residents here blame the flood on discharge from the Peñitas Dam. Twenty five percent of the state's fresh water passes through the municipality. It has a large amount of surface water in the form of rivers, streams and lakes. The most important rivers include Carrizal, Samaria, Cunduacán, Nacajuca, González, Calzada, San Cipriano and Jahuactal, and the important lakes are Cantemó, La Ramada, Desagüe and Pucté.

=== Climate ===
The climate is hot and humid with abundant rain year round, especially in the summer. The average annual temperature is 26.4C. Highest temperatures occur in May with an average of 30.8C and low temperatures generally occur in January with an average of 22.4C. The highest and lowest temperatures ever recorded are 44C and 12C respectively.

Average annual rainfall for the area is 1707.2mm with September accounting for most of the precipitation at an average of 735.8mm. The driest month is April with 251.2mm. Average annual relative humidity ranges from 78% in May and June to 85% in January and February. The windiest months are November and December with speeds of up to 32 km/h. In June and July, average wind speed is 20 km/h.

=== Flora and fauna ===
The dominant ecosystem in the municipality is wetland with a wide variety of flora and fauna. However, this ecosystem has been badly degraded by overexploitation. In addition, there are some areas with lakes, grassland and forests. The little forest area has also been seriously threatened by over –logging for tropical hardwoods and clearing for pasture. The main fauna of the area include rabbits, opossums, armadillos, caiman crocodiles, pejelagarto, coral snakes, iguanas and more, all of which are considered threatened.

== Culture ==
The municipality's culture is strongly influenced by the Chontal Maya population especially in religious traditions which are a syncretism of Catholic and indigenous rituals. The village of Olcuatitlán is noted for its Candlemas celebration in early February masses, dances and fireworks. Another aspect is the use of leafy tree branches used as offerings to religious images in the hope for good crops and livestock production for the coming year. Traditional dress for women consists of a long, full flowered skirt and a white cotton blouse embroidered around the neck. For men, it consists of white cotton pants and shirt with a red handkerchief around the neck with a hat called “chontal”, carrying back and machete. Traditional foodstuffs include a plant called guao (Comocladia dentate), turtle, pejelagarto and other river fish and turkey. Traditional sweets are made from coconut, papaya, lemons, mangos, prunes and a type of yam (camote). The most traditional drink is pozol, made from chocolate and corn, along with hot chocolate and fruit drinks. The community of Saloya is known for its palapa type restaurants specializing in regional dishes and seafood.

== Socioeconomics ==
Considered to have a low level of economic marginalization. As of 2010, the number of homes in the municipality was 19,670, 29,029 residences as of 2010 up from 19,670 in 2005, most of which were owned by their occupants. Most homes in the municipality (just under 90%) have cement foundations, brick or block walls and asbestos or zinc laminate roofs. Just under 72% have running water, about 83% have sewerage and about 93% have electricity. Most homes have between 2 and seven occupants with an average of about five.

The municipality has a surface of 48,837 hectares. Five percent of this is used for agriculture, 43% is for livestock, 48% is forest or other wild areas and the rest is developed or not considered productive. Major crops are corn and beans both principally produced for auto-consumption. Livestock is practiced extensively in the municipality mostly cattle with some pigs, horses and domestic fowl.

Since the 1970s, there have been efforts to form artificial land in lake areas for cultivation and aquaculture. The artificial land is called “camellones Chontales” and is similar to Aztec chinampas. One difference is that these “camellones” are formed to a large extent from cacao pods. Despite the fish farming which does occur among thirty cooperatives and eighteen ejido organizations, most fishing is still for auto-consumption.

The main natural resource for the municipality is petroleum which is managed by the state-owned oil company PEMEX. It has twenty three wells in the area in two fields called Sen and Mecoacán. The two fields produce over nineteen million barrels of oil and over 52 billion cubic feet of natural gas per year. The arrival of oil exploration in the area in the 1980s led to a rise in construction and some service industries in the area. The Chontal Maya especially became employed in construction. Many became drawn to outside employment as agriculture no longer provided sufficient living. Most other industry is from family concerns and small workshops making furniture, piloncillo, brooms, bread and decorating clothing. Reed craft is also important making mats, hats and carrying bags. Leatherwork generally consists of belts and saddles. There are also some ceramic making.

Development of the commerce sector is slow to stagnant due to the lack of infrastructure. Most establishments sell basic goods such as foodstuffs. However, there are banks, restaurants, gas stations, auto parts, and supermarkets. The municipality has three traditional public markets, one in the municipal seat, one in the Limitas Ejido and one in Bosques de Saloya. There is one tianguis market. These serve about 94% of the municipality's population. The main tourist attraction of the area is the handcraft workshops in Olcuatitán, Mazateupa and Tapotzingo, along with the municipality's colorful churches with Chontal influence. The Arroyo Ranch, five km from the city of Nacajuca, creates dresses, blouses, shirts, tablecloths and napkins, all with colorful embroidery mostly on the borders. These are particularly prevalent on traditional women's dress with colors such as red, green, yellow, orange, blue and brown over a black background. The borders often contain images such as flower, animals, fruit and even landscapes.
