= Paraíso, Tabasco =

Town and municipality in the Mexican state of Tabasco

- Town & Municipality
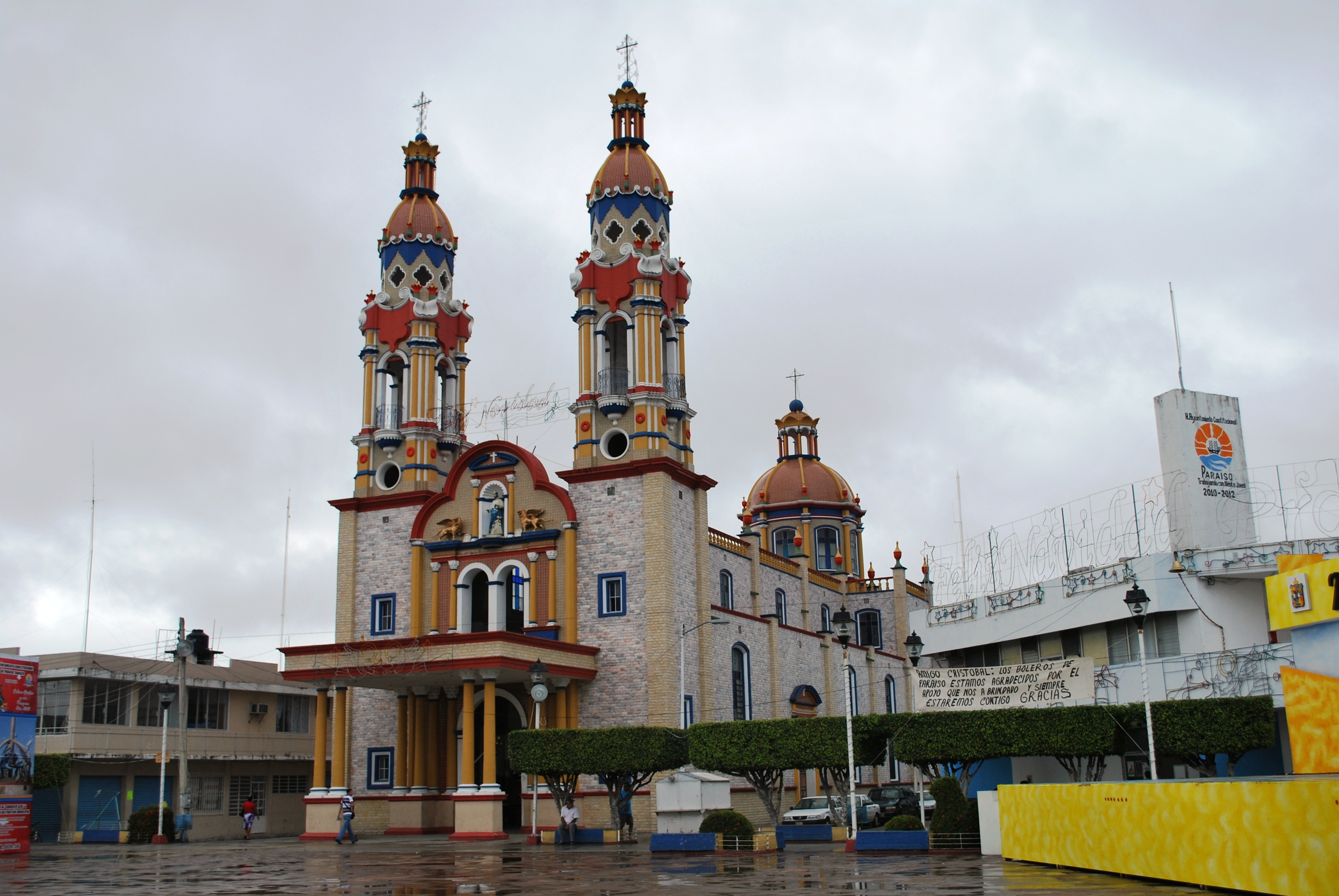
- San Marcos Church in Paraíso

- Location of the municipality within Tabasco

- Location within Tabasco Location within Mexico
- Coordinates: 18°23′46″N 93°12′46″W
- Country: Mexico
- State: Tabasco
- Founded: 1840s

Area
  - City: 577.55 km^{2} (222.99 sq mi)
- Elevation (of seat): 10 m (33 ft)

Population (2010)
  - City: 86,632
- Time zone: UTC-6 (Central)
- Postal code (of seat): 86600
- Website: paraiso.gob.mx

Paraíso is a town located in the north of the Mexican state of Tabasco, about 75 km due north of the state capital of Villahermosa on the Gulf of Mexico. Much of the area is traditionally dedicated to fishing and agriculture. Today, it is also an oil-producing area with the mostly oil-dedicated port of Dos Bocas. There is also some tourism connected to the area's beaches and natural attractions, and the area is promoted under the state's Cacao Route tourism program.

== The town ==
The town of Paraíso is located on the coast of Tabasco, 75 km north of the capital of Villahermosa. Although one of its important economic activities is tourism, the center of the town has not been overwhelmed with hotels and other tourist oriented businesses. Most of the houses of the town are modest, constructed with brick or adobe with a few hacienda style houses with lavish gardens.

The center of the town is marked by a large plaza with the San Marcos Church on the north side. It and the La Asunción Church are the two most important as they represent its two patron saints of Mark the Evangelist and Our Lady of the Assumption. Parque Central Guillermo Sevilla Fiqueroa features modern architecture with a tall clock tower. It also has areas with gardens and trees and a civic plaza set up to double as an open-air theater. There is also a cafeteria and a reflecting pool.

Carnival begins on 20 January with an event called "La Pintorrea." On Sunday before Ash Wednesday there is a "flour war" with widows asking for alms on Ash Wednesday. After mass the day ends with the burning of an effigy called "Juan Carnaval."

== History ==
Although popular etymology has the name derived from "Paso del Paraíso" (Heaven's Pass), in reality the name is from a type of leafy trees of the mahogany family. The municipality does not have a coat-of-arms.

The town of Paraíso was most likely founded sometime between 1848 and 1852 as a camp by indigenous people in the Mecoacán area and then later occupied by mestizos from Jalpa de Méndez and Comalcalco. However, local writer Ángel Suárez Rodríguez asserts that it was founded in 1823 when the ranch of the same name was declared a town. It is true that in this year a church dedicated to Mark the Evangelist and the Virgin of the Assumption was built on the ranch.

From the 19th century on, much of the area was dedicated to the production of cocoa and fruit trees. During this same time, it was a Liberal or federalist stronghold even having its own radical guerrilla army known as "Los Cangrejos y Pejelagartos" (Crabs and Pejalagarto fish). However, the town declined in the latter part of the century and by 1872 there were only four permanent houses.

During the Mexican Revolution, General Ignacio Gutierrez Gomez took the town in 1911. It was taken again in 1914 by Generals Carlos Greene Ramirez and Ramon Sosa Torres.

After the war, the city grew sufficiently that in 1945 it was declared a city by Tabasco governor Noé de la Flor Casanova.

== Geography ==
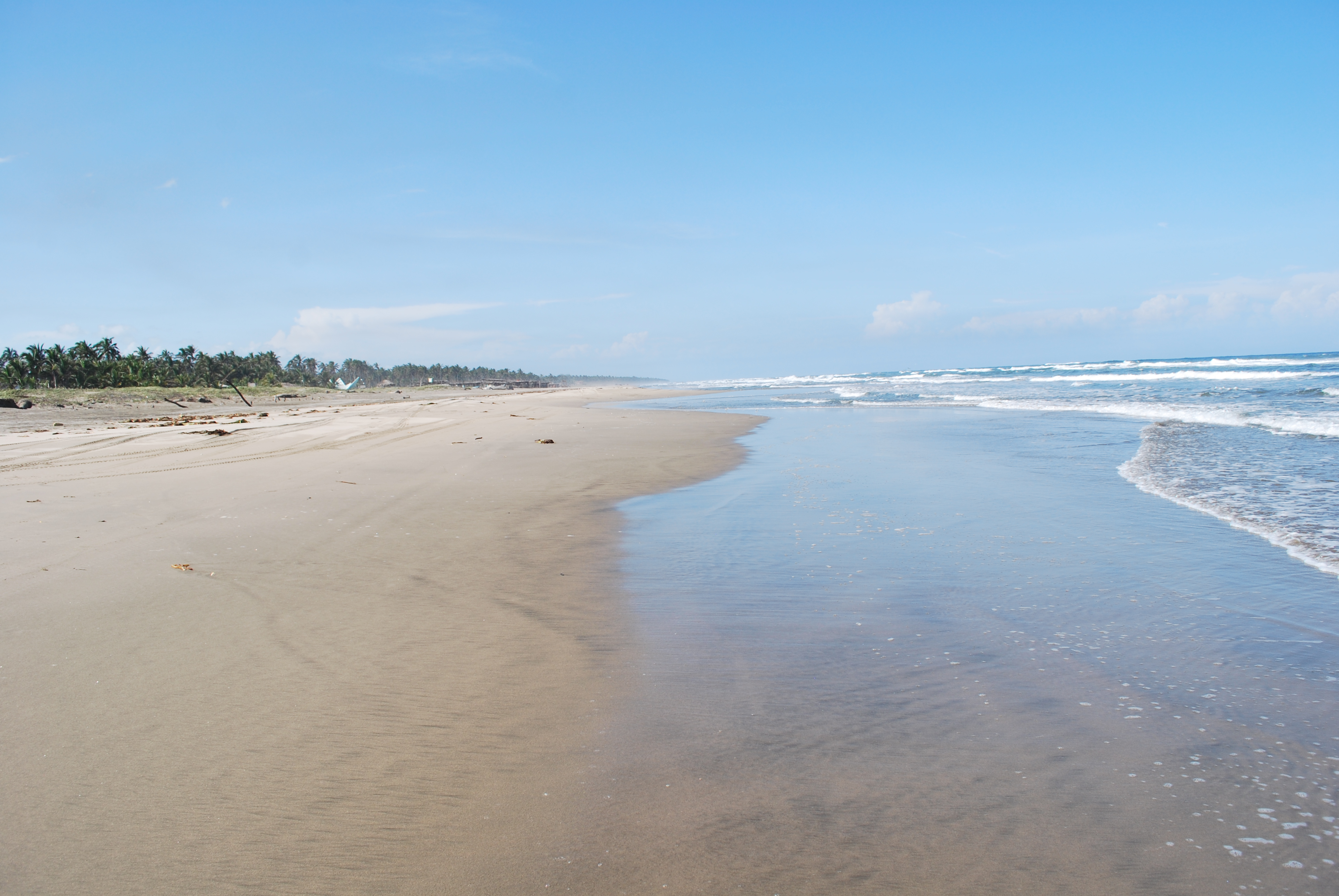
Varadero Beach

The land is part of the Tabasco floodplain on the Gulf of Mexico with an average elevation of only two meters above sea level. It is flat with a slight incline towards the sea. The soil is sandy with some clay mixed nearest the ocean with clay dominating inland. Due to its low-lying nature and climate, the area has abundant surface water in the forms of lagoons, lakes, estuaries and wetlands. Major bodies of water include lakes and lagoons such as Mecoacán, La Machona, Tupilco, Puente de Ostión, La Encerrada (Amatillo), Tres Palmas, El Zorro, Arrastradero, Las Flores, Lagartera Tilapa, Manatí and El Eslabón. The last receives its waters from the Gonzalez River as it empties into the Gulf. Other rivers and streams include the Seco, El Corcho, Tupilco, Cocohital, El Corinto, and Arroyo Verde.

Surface water flow in the municipality is split into east and west, both connected by the Río Seco River and the Jobo Canal. The east is dominated by the Mecoacán lagoon which opens into the Gulf of Mexico at Dos Bocas. Linked to it are smaller lagoons such as the Eslabón, La Tinaja and El Carmen/Ramírez. The Mecoacán Lagoon and estuary is a shallow area with an average depth of 1.5 meters and a total extension of 5,160 hectares. Mecoacán is considered to be the second most important lagoon system in Tabasco with extensive oyster banks below bordered by mangrove areas which have been reduced through timber exploitation. The seaward side is formed by a chain of small islands at the mouth of the river with the largest three km in length. The lagoon receives fresh water from the Cuxcuxapa River and some smaller streams. There are also two small lakes such as the Los Angeles. The González River is the principal river on the east side, which forms the border with Centla municipality. It forms the Estero Lagoon before emptying into the sea at the Chiltepec. The west also has the Arrastradero Lagoon, which receives fresh water from various small streams such as El Tigre. It connects to a smaller lagoon called Las Flores. Las Tres Palmas Lake extends to the north–south, widest in the north. It receives water from the Soledad River. Other lakes include Puente de Ostion, Tupilquillo and Tía Juana.

=== Climate ===
The climate is hot and wet with rains year round, especially in the summer/fall with an average annual rainfall of 1,751.4 mm. Flooding is a common problem with the last major flooding emergency declared in October 2011. The coldest months are November, December and January with average temperatures around 22 °C. The hottest month is May with average temperatures around 30 °C. Absolute minimums and maximums range from 12 °C to 44 °C. The windiest months are October, November and December when winds can reach 30 km/h.

Paraíso has a tropical monsoon climate according to the Köppen climate classification, with a lengthy wet season and high temperatures year round. The wet season lasts from May to February, with only March and April qualifying as true dry season months, as they average less than 60 millimeters of rainfall. Nonetheless, as is typical for places with a tropical monsoon climate, even the dry season sees some precipitation as well. April is the driest month, with an average of 44 millimeters, and October the wettest, averaging 345 millimeters. Daily high temperatures range from a high of 34.4 °C in May to a low 27.4 °C in January. Night temperatures tend to hover in the low 20s, dropping slightly below that from December to February.

Climate data for Paraíso, Tabasco
Month	Jan	Feb	Mar	Apr	May	Jun	Jul	Aug	Sep	Oct	Nov	Dec	Year
Mean daily maximum °C (°F)	27.4 (81.3)	29.2 (84.6)	31.3 (88.3)	33.7 (92.7)	34.4 (93.9)	34.1 (93.4)	33.6 (92.5)	33.9 (93.0)	32.7 (90.9)	31.1 (88.0)	29.5 (85.1)	28.0 (82.4)	31.6 (88.8)
Daily mean °C (°F)	22.8 (73.0)	24.1 (75.4)	25.8 (78.4)	27.8 (82.0)	28.5 (83.3)	28.6 (83.5)	28.3 (82.9)	28.4 (83.1)	27.6 (81.7)	26.4 (79.5)	24.9 (76.8)	23.4 (74.1)	26.4 (79.5)
Mean daily minimum °C (°F)	18.3 (64.9)	19.0 (66.2)	20.3 (68.5)	21.9 (71.4)	22.6 (72.7)	23.1 (73.6)	23.0 (73.4)	22.9 (73.2)	22.6 (72.7)	21.8 (71.2)	20.3 (68.5)	18.9 (66.0)	21.2 (70.2)
Average rainfall mm (inches)	155 (6.1)	84 (3.3)	53 (2.1)	44 (1.7)	72 (2.8)	154 (6.1)	128 (5.0)	136 (5.4)	309 (12.2)	345 (13.6)	182 (7.2)	158 (6.2)	1,820 (71.7)
Source: Climate-Data.org

=== Flora and fauna ===
The area along the Gulf of Mexico has sandy soils with areas terminating in full beach. Soils near the ocean tend to be saline. Most of the municipality has perennial rainforest with trees between fifteen and thirty meters tall. However, most of these areas are disturbed with none virgin. In the low ocean front areas there are beaches and mangroves. There is the occasional nopal cactus. Wildlife is mostly limited to bird and reptile species such as storks, kingfishers, seagulls, buzzards, marine and freshwater turtles, and various small lizards.

== Economy ==
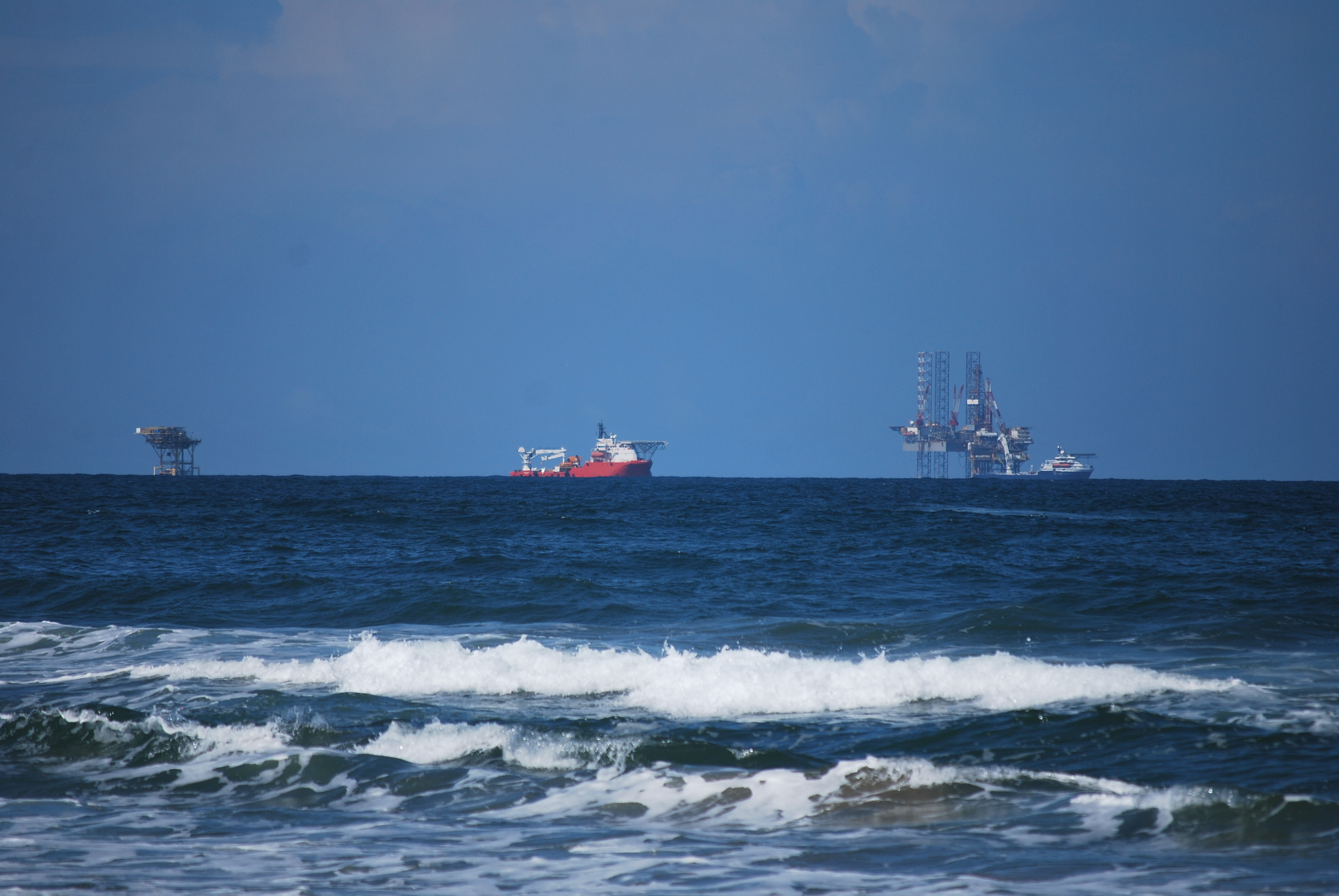
Oil rigs and tanker off the coast of the municipality

The municipality has 57,755 hectares of land with 17% used for agriculture, 16% for livestock, 12% forest and 55% is residential/urban, wetlands or bodies of water. The municipality has an annual agricultural, industrial, arts and crafts fair in April. About thirty three percent of the working population is employed in agriculture and fishing. The most important crop in the municipality is coconut as the number one producer in the state, accounting for over sixty percent of cropland. Other important crops include cacao and bananas. Corn and beans are generally grown in small plots for family consumption. Livestock is not an important economic product although some cattle, pigs and domestic fowl is raised. There are still some tropical hardwood trees such as mahogany which is mostly used to make furniture. Fishing occurs in both ocean and fresh waters catching sea bass, shrimp and shellfish. It is a major producer and distributor of oysters and lately of edible jellyfish, most of which is farmed. However, fishing has been threatened by a number of factors. Oil spills and red tide have led to closure of fishing areas. In the 2000s, wild oyster yields dropped almost fifty percent in the lagoons of the Tabasco coast. It is traditional here for men to harvest oysters and the women to process them but this economic model is disappearing. Over exploitation of the mollusk is the main reason behind the drop in production. A study by the Universidad Juárez Autónoma de Tabasco strongly recommends the implementation of oyster farming to replace reliance on oysters growing wild, with state authorities also pushing for this change. However, local fishermen have been resistant to outside interference.

Just under twenty eight percent of the working population is employed in mining, petroleum, construction and manufacturing. Oil drilling is mostly done in two fields: Puerto Ceiba Mesozoico and Puerto Ceiba Terciario, each with two wells. These produce over two thousand barrels daily along with 1.2 million cubic feet of natural gas. Most manufacturing is small concerns which produce corn flour, chocolate, ice, clothing, cinderblock and tortillas. The production of fiberglass is an important source of employment. Handcrafts include figures from dried coconuts and seashells as well as hammocks.

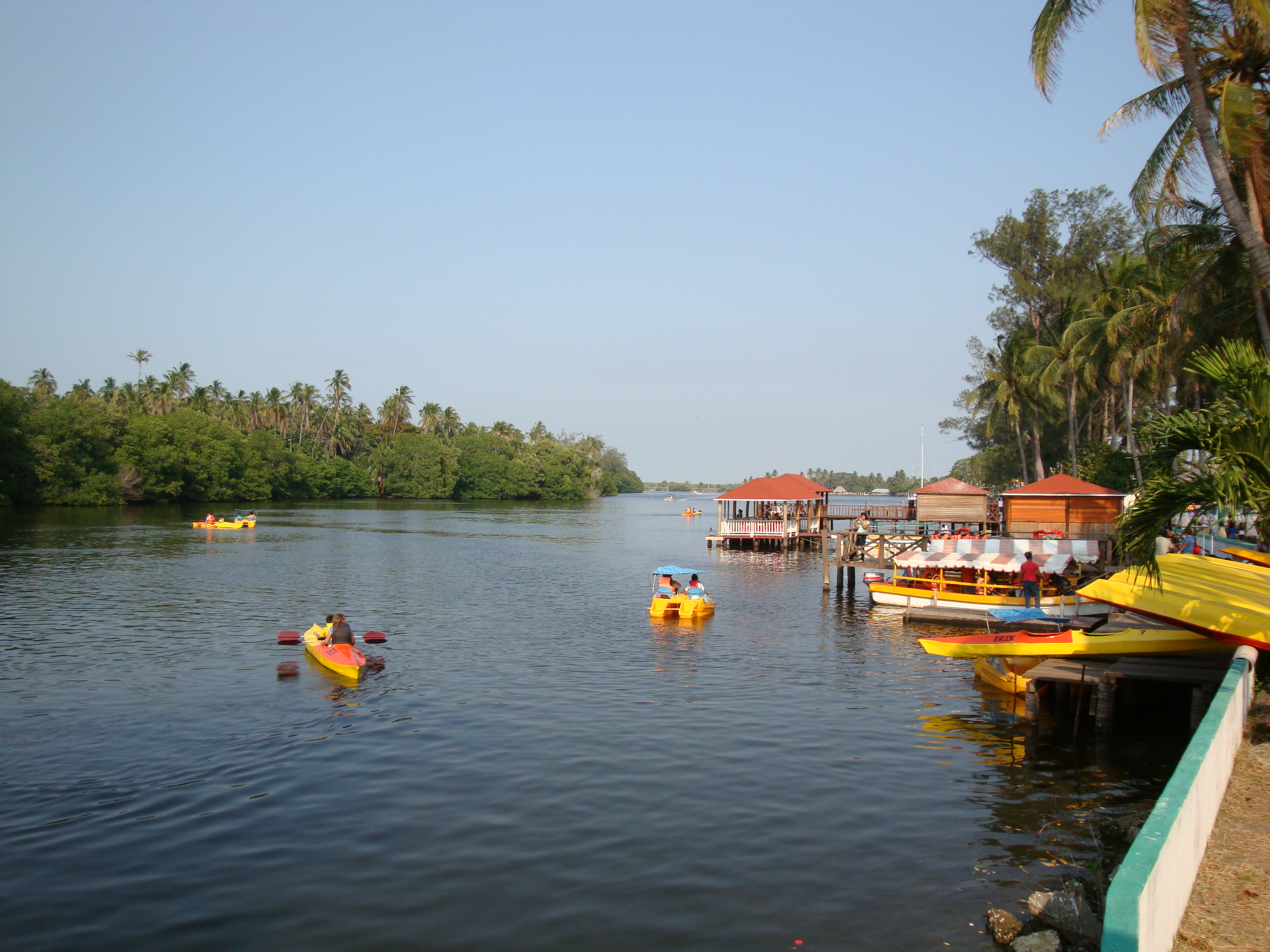
Kayak's in Puerto Ceiba.

Oil spills both on land and in the ocean have been problematic not only for fishing but for tourism as well. When spills happen, the smell of oil can dominate the air of the surrounding areas. Tabasco beaches have been affected by spills that have occurred off of Campeche. Local fishermen have expressed concerns about the viability of their livelihoods due to oil spills including those such as the Deepwater Horizon oil spill off the coast of the United States. Paraíso beaches have been closed on occasion due to high toxicity of chemical spills, which negatively affects local tourism. In 2005, PEMEX cleaned twelve tons of pitch and other contaminants off 77 km of Tabasco beaches, including those in Paraíso. The beaches and waters off them are monitored by federal and state authorities for toxicity and aptness for use by tourists.

Almost thirty five percent are employed in commerce, tourism and services. The municipality has four traditional markets and a weekly tianguis along with supermarkets, corner stores and other retail outlets. Tourism is relatively undeveloped but is mostly based on the areas beaches, fishing and natural sites. The municipality's natural environment has been used for a number of Mexican telenovelas. Available hotels range from small inns to one four-star hotel. The municipality is just north of the Comalcalco archeological site as part of the Cacao Route.

The most popular tourist area of the municipality is the Puerto Ceiba area due to its vegetation, docks as well as its inn with restaurant. Seafood dishes typical of the area include oysters, and tourists can also tour the Mecoacán Lagoon by boat. The Parador Turístico Puerto Ceiba is a look out area for the Mecoacán Lagoon. It offers boat tours on the Gonzalez River to the Gulf as well as the Mecoacán and Bellote Lagoons. The Aqua Terra Paradise rents kayaks and paddle boats and offers rides on banana boats, motor boats and gives classes on recreational diving. There is also services for recreational fishing, snorkeling and night diving.

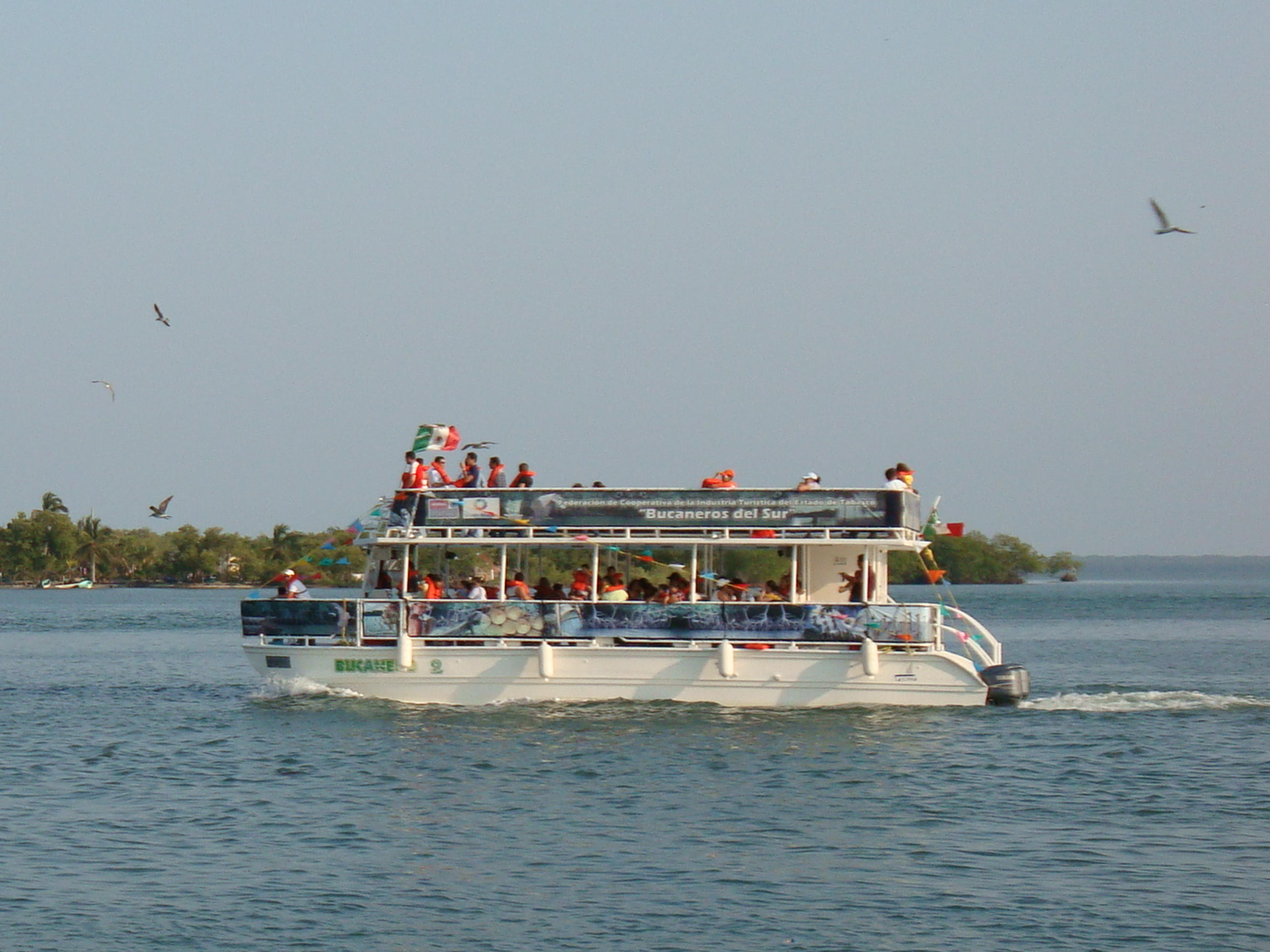
Boat in Mecoacán Lagoon.

The El Paraíso Tourist Center is a recreational center by the beach. It has a pool, hotel, restaurant, bungalows, dressing rooms and more. The beach in the area has a width of between forty and seventy meters with fine gray sand and warm blue waters with gentle waves. The water is shallow up to 100 meters out.

The Barra de Tupilco is a long beach with gray sand and blue green water. This area is commonly visited during the Holy Week vacation period. The Tupilco lighthouse is one of the oldest in the state. Playa Bruja beach is three km from Chiltepec, 200 meters long and forty meters wide. It has fine gray sand with gentle waves on clear green waters. It has palapas, hammocks, a restaurant and dressing rooms among the palms and marine birds. Playa Varadero has equipment for volleyball and soccer. It is the site of musical events during the Holy Week vacation period. Other beaches in the area include Playa Sol, Pico de Oro, Arroyo Verde, Playa Dorado Paraíso y mar, Nuevo Paraíso and Cangrejopolis.

"The República de Paraíso" tourism corridor is a modern four-lane boulevard that connects the town with Puerto Ceiba and El Bellote to the east. The road is lined with various restaurants mostly specializing in seafood with a number having a view of the Mecoacán Lagoon.

Isla Rebeca is surrounded by mangroves and beaches with fine gray sand and calm waters. In the early 2000s, there was an attempt to build an ecotourism resort on Isla Rebeca but the project was abandoned which many of the facilities half built. The island is considered to be a nature reserve with species such as raccoons, iguanas and many species of water birds. The island has an extension of about 200 hectares.

Other attractions include a center for the breeding of fresh water turtles, the only in Latin America and a crocodile sanctuary at the Tupilco Lagoon.

== Dos Bocas port ==
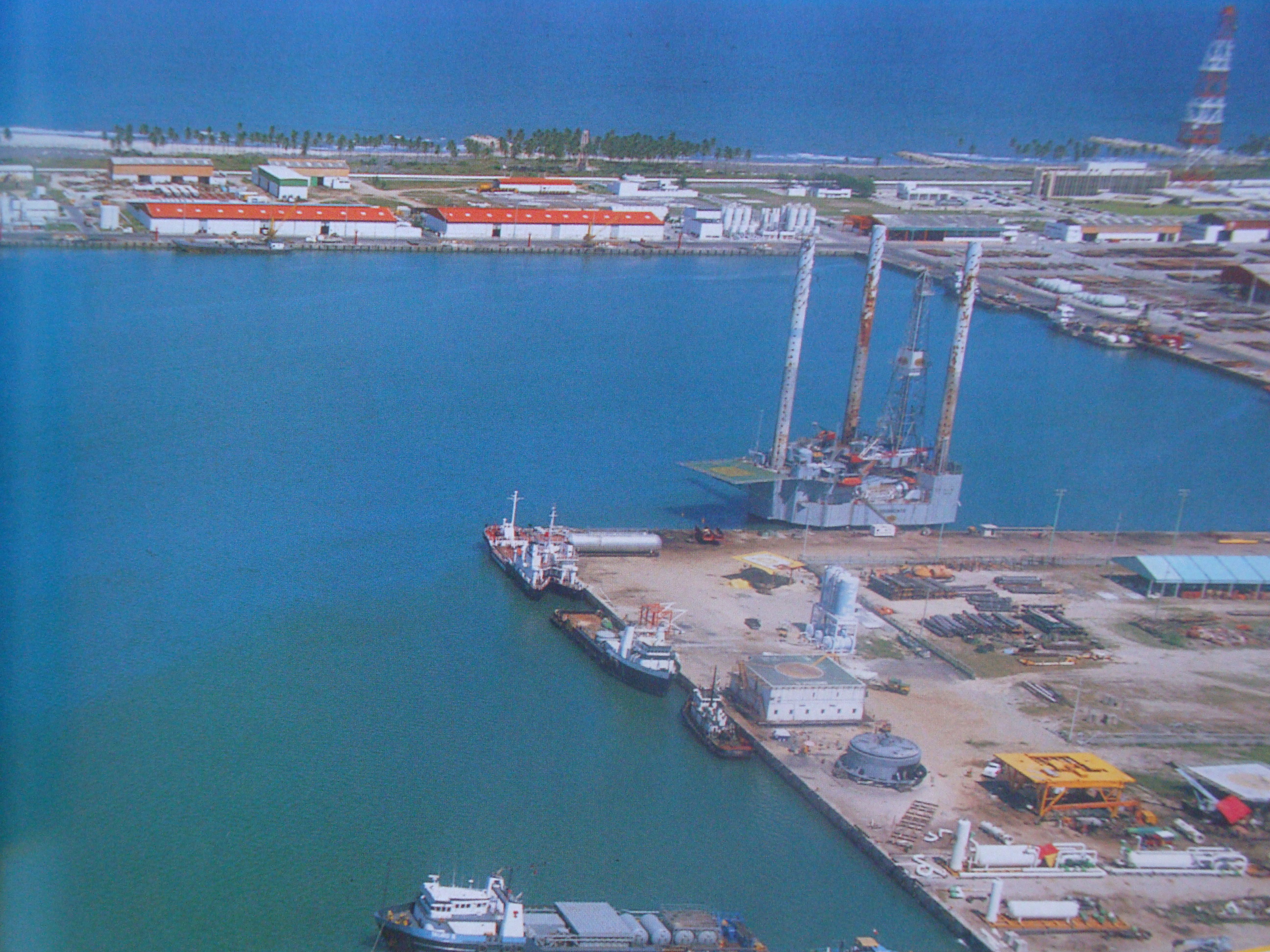
Dos Bocas port, one of the most important oil ports in Mexico.

The Dos Bocas port (Puerto dos Bocas in Spanish) was constructed in 1979 and started operating in 1982. It was enlarged starting in 1982 with the East and West Piers. In 2005, the multi-purpose terminal began operating and an industrial park was established. It primarily exists for the shipment of petroleum but also handles other industrial and commercial cargo. The Puerto de Dos Bocas accounts for as much as 85% of Mexico's oil production and imports equipment and machinery for oil exploration and development activities. The port also imports products, equipment, and machinery to support local agricultural production, much of which is exported. It also exports include bananas, mango, pineapple, Persian lemon, papaya, orange, coffee, sugar cane, cocoa, and peppers as well as products based on livestock. Exports out of the port mostly come from the states of Tabasco, Campeche, Chiapas and the south of Veracruz. In 2008, Dos Bocas exported about 8 million tons of cargo, down dramatically from its peak in 2003 when over 30 million tons of foreign trade cargo was exported. It also received about two thousand passengers in 2008. The port primarily ships to Brownsville, Houston, Galveston, New Orleans, Mobile and Jacksonville, but cargo also goes to and from other ports in southeast Mexico and Central America, the Caribbean, Europe, North Africa and the Middle East. The Dos Bocas port also offers guided tours.

On July 26, 2019, the Secretariat of Energy announced the signing of contracts for construction of an oil refinery. The refinery will have a capacity of 340,000 barrels of oil. The refinery has been object of controversy due to its cost overruns and a lack of budget transparency.
