= Comalcalco Municipality =

Municipality in the Mexican state of Tabasco

Coordinates: 18°16′18″N 93°13′29″W

Comalcalco
- Municipality
- Motto: "La Perla de la Chontalpa"
- Location of the municipality in Tabasco.
- Country: Mexico
- State: Tabasco

Government
  - Type: Ovidio Peralta Suárez
  - Federal electoral district: Tabasco's 3rd
- Elevation: 5 and 13 m (16 and 43 ft)

Population (2020)
  - Total: 214 877
- Time zone: UTC-6 (Zona Centro)

Comalcalco is a municipality in the Mexican state of Tabasco.

The municipal seat is the city of Comalcalco.
