= Jonuta Municipality =

Municipality in the Mexican state of Tabasco

Jonuta
- Municipality
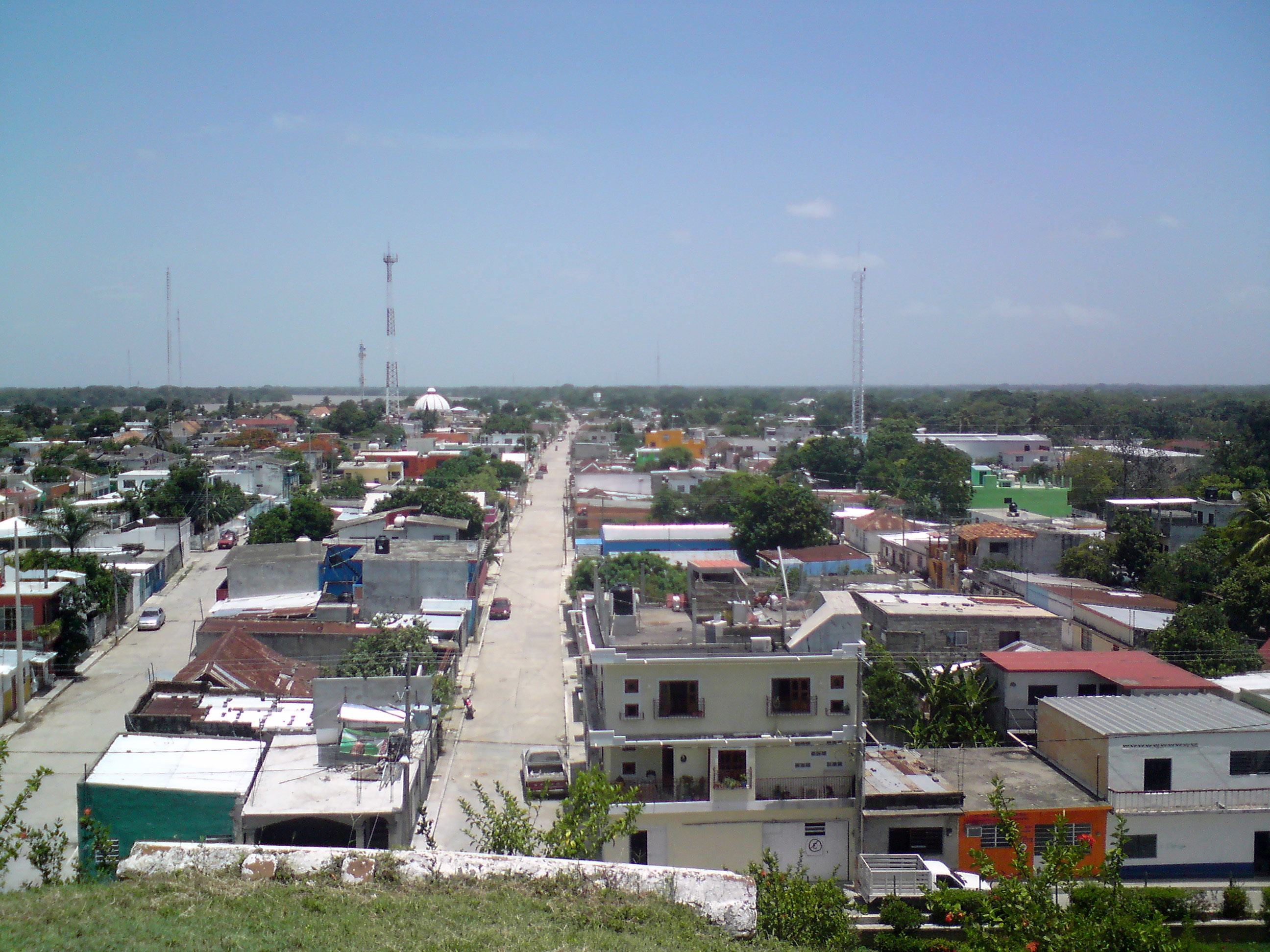

- Location of Jonuta Municipality in Tabasco
- Coordinates: 18°05′N 92°08′W
- Country: Mexico
- State: Tabasco

Government
  - Federal electoral district: Tabasco's 1st
- Time zone: UTC-6 (Zona Centro)

Jonuta is a municipality in the Mexican state of Tabasco. The municipal seat is the city of Jonuta.
