= Macuspana =

City in the Mexican state of Tabasco

Coordinates: 17°46′N 92°36′W

Tabasco

Macuspana is a city in Macuspana Municipality in the south-central part of the state of Tabasco in southeastern Mexico. The city of Macuspana had a 2005 census population of 30,661 and is the fifth-largest city in the state. It is the municipal seat of the municipality of Macuspana, which has an area of 2,551.7 km^{2} (985.22 sq mi) and a population of 142,954, which includes numerous smaller communities. The largest of these communities is Benito Juárez (San Carlos).

It is the birthplace of Andrés Manuel López Obrador.

== Name ==
The etymology of Macuspana's name is uncertain. The Enciclopedia de los municipios de México offers three possible explanations:

- From the Nahuatl Macui-chpana, meaning "place of the five sweepings" or "place of the five cleansings".
- From the Zoque Macu-pane, meaning "place where the priest goes".
- A corruption of the given names Marcos and Juana, presumably the founders of the settlement.

== Geography ==
The geographical vicinity is also known as the Macuspana Basin.

=== Climate ===
Climate data for Macuspana
Month	Jan	Feb	Mar	Apr	May	Jun	Jul	Aug	Sep	Oct	Nov	Dec	Year
Mean daily maximum °C (°F)	28.3 (82.9)	29.8 (85.6)	32.4 (90.3)	34.6 (94.3)	35.8 (96.4)	34.7 (94.5)	34.4 (93.9)	34.3 (93.7)	33.2 (91.8)	31.7 (89.1)	30.3 (86.5)	28.7 (83.7)	32.4 (90.3)
Mean daily minimum °C (°F)	18.1 (64.6)	18.7 (65.7)	20.1 (68.2)	22.0 (71.6)	23.1 (73.6)	23.2 (73.8)	22.9 (73.2)	22.9 (73.2)	22.9 (73.2)	22 (72)	20.6 (69.1)	19.0 (66.2)	21.3 (70.3)
Average precipitation mm (inches)	150 (5.9)	120 (4.7)	69 (2.7)	66 (2.6)	120 (4.9)	300 (11.8)	200 (7.9)	270 (10.7)	400 (15.7)	340 (13.3)	210 (8.1)	160 (6.3)	2,400 (94.5)
Source: Weatherbase
