= Centro Municipality, Tabasco =

Municipality in the Mexican state of Tabasco

Coordinates: 17°59′21″N 92°55′41″W

Centro
- Municipality
- Coat of arms

- Location of the municipality within Tabasco
- Country: Mexico
- State: Tabasco
- Capital: Villahermosa

Government
  - Federal electoral district: Tabasco's 4th & 6th

Area
  - Total: 1,612 km^{2} (622 sq mi)

Population (2010)
  - Total: 640,359
  - Density: 397.2/km^{2} (1,029/sq mi)
- Time zone: UTC-6 (Zona Centro)

The Municipality of Centro is one of the 17 municipalities of the Mexican state of Tabasco. Its municipal seat is located in the city of Villahermosa. The municipality had a 2010 census population of 640,359 inhabitants, 353,577 (55.2%) of whom lived in its municipal seat, Villahermosa.

The municipal government is headed by the municipal president (mayor) of Centro.

== Towns and villages ==
The municipality has the distinction of having 72 towns (localities) of over 1,000 inhabitants, and 116 towns of over 500 inhabitants, in both cases more than any other municipality in Mexico. The largest localities (cities, towns, and villages) are:

Name	2010 Census Population
Villahermosa	353,577
Playas del Rosario (Subteniente García)	21,893
Ocuiltzapotlán	18,312
Parrilla II	10,967
Parrilla	9,964
Tamulté de las Sabanas	8,824
Medellín y Madero Segunda Sección	7,825
Río Viejo Primera Sección	6,726
Macultepec	6,485
Luis Gil Pérez	6,083
Guapinol	5,768
Buena Vista Río Nuevo Segunda Sección	5,740
La Lima	5,638
Buena Vista Río Nuevo Primera Sección	5,627
Medellín y Pigua Tercera Sección	5,520
Ixtacomitán Primera Sección	5,243
Anacleto Canabal Segunda Sección	5,153
Total Municipality	640,359

== See also ==
- List of municipal presidents of Centro Municipality, Tabasco
