= Centla Municipality =

Municipality in the Mexican state of Tabasco

Coordinates: 18°20′N 92°30′W

Centla
- Municipality
- Location of the municipality in Tabasco.
- Country: Mexico
- State: Tabasco
- Seat: Frontera

Population (2020)
  - Total: 107,731
- Time zone: UTC-6 (Zona Centro)
- Website: centla.gob.mx

Centla is a municipality in the Mexican state of Tabasco.

The municipality reported a population of 107,731 in the 2020 Census, up 5.5% from 2010.

The municipal seat is the city of Frontera.
