= Chontalpa =

Area in the Mexican state of Tabasco

Coordinates: 18°2′47.92″N 93°35′33.11″W

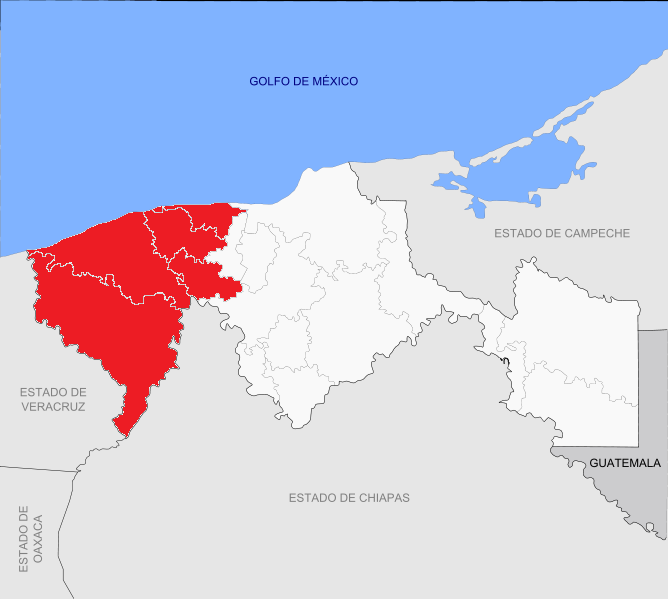
Map of the Chontalpa area in Tabasco

Chontalpa is a region in the northwest of the Mexican state of Tabasco, consisting of five municipalities. Although the name refers to the state's Chontal Maya population, modern Chontalpa is a subregion of the Grijalva Region that surrounds the Grijalva River, with boundaries defined by economic concerns. A large percentage of the state's Chontal Maya population does live in the region, with the municipality of Nacajuca having the largest concentration of Chontal Maya indigenous individuals, while the next largest concentration is found just east of the region, in the Villahermosa area. The Chontalpa economy is heavily dependent on agriculture, especially livestock, as well as on its oil industry. The reliance on these sectors has prompted conflict since the 20th century, as the environmental effects of the oil industry have caused concerns of effects on agriculture. Chontalpa is also home to Tabasco's two main archeological sites, La Venta and Comalcalco, along with numerous smaller sites.

== Geography and environment ==
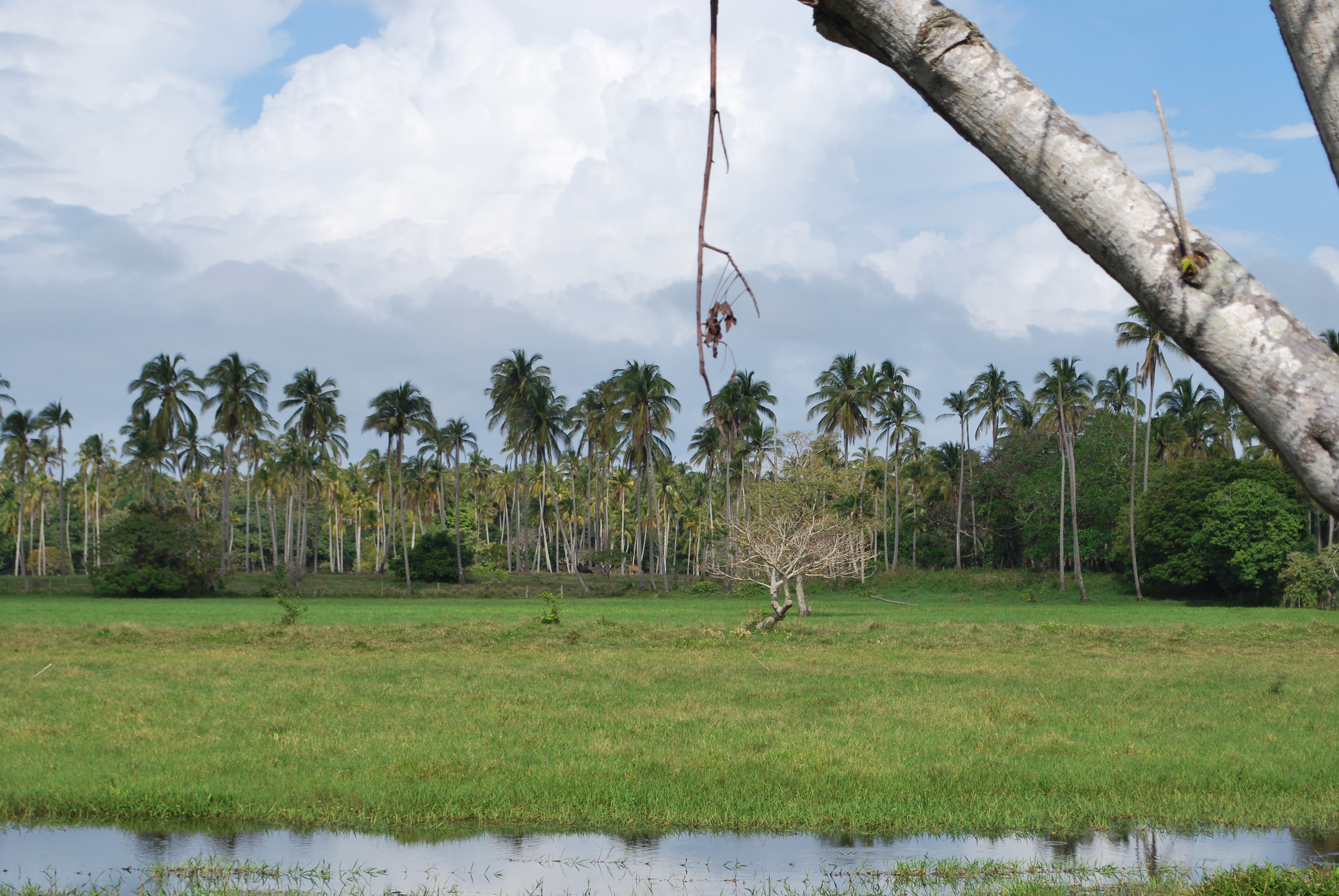
Wetland area near Sánchez Magallanes

Chontalpa is officially a subregion of Grijalva, which is defined as lands in Tabasco reliant on the Grijalva River and related surface water. It consists of the municipalities of Huimanguillo, Cárdenas, Cunduacán, Comalcalco and Paraíso, with its capital as the city of Comalcalco. It is the second largest of Tabasco's subregions with an area of 7,482.12km², representing 31.08% of the state. Chontalpa borders the Gulf of Mexico to the north, the state of Chiapas to the south, the state of Veracruz to the west and the municipalities of Centla, Centro (Villahermosa) and Jalpa de Méndez to the east.

Like the rest of Tabasco, the Chontalpa region is a mostly flat floodplain with a small area of highlands along the border with Chiapas. The floodplain only has an average elevation of ten meters above sea level with some areas being below sea level. Elevations generally do not exceed forty meters, but the highest point is Mono Pelado at 970 meters above sea level.

The climate is hot and humid with most precipitation occurring during summer and fall. The average annual rainfall is about 2000 mm. The region is subject to numerous storms and even hurricanes arriving from the Gulf of Mexico. These storms are unimpeded by the low flat plain, with the elevations near the Chiapas border the first barrier. The rain that falls here feeds much of the area's rivers, especially the Amatan and Oxlotan, with rainfalls up to 4,000 mm per year. Other important rivers in the flat areas include the Samaría, Mezcalpa, Tonalá and Santana. This means that large quantities of fresh water flows towards the Gulf of Mexico. In addition to rivers, this also produces large areas of lakes, marshes and other wetlands and lagoons around estuaries such as the Mecoacán Lagoon. It also means that the flat areas of the region are highly susceptible to flooding, including the 2007 Tabasco flood. These were caused by unusually heavy rain in October of that year brought in by multiple cold fronts, bringing in a record of 1,054mm of rain to the region in only three days. However, significant flooding is relatively frequent with major events occurring in 2008 and 2009. In 2009, the Blasillo River caused major flooding affecting 4,500 families.

Wild vegetation is that associated with wetlands both on land and aquatic. This includes Thalia geniculata, kapoks (Ceiba petandra), palo mulato (Bursera simaruba), zapote (Pachira aquatic), maculis (Tebebuia rosea) and royal palm (Royestonea regia) . Rainforest used to cover much of the area but now are only found in about four percent of the entire state. Wetlands with reeds and mangroves are still common. The mangrove forests of the region are home to over 100 species and are a main source of oxygenation. They also work to prevent erosion and to control pollution. However, deforestation of mature mangroves in the area continues to be a serious problem despite government efforts to replant. The problem is the cutting of the plants for wood by local residents. Most of the deforestation of the region has occurred as a result of the Chontalpa Plan, which began in the 1960s to drain areas of wetlands to convert them into farm and pasture land. Wildlife has been seriously harmed by the activities of man but still include iguanas and other lizards, various species of birds and other reptiles such as freshwater turtles although a number of these are in danger of extinction.

Attempts to preserve what is left of the area's wild vegetation include a number of wildlife reserves. The Parque Estatal de la Sierra or Sierra State Park is located in the municipalities of Tacotalpa and Teapa. It also includes the village of Oxolotan, which is a traditional indigenous community and Tapijulapa, a Pueblo Mágico . The Villa Luz Ecological Reserve extends over forty hectares, with eighty percent covered in dense vegetation and in all there are various streams both fresh water and sulfur laced liquid which rise from springs in the earth. The Oxolotan River also passes through with several waterfalls, as well as the Sardinas Cave which has almost 1500 meters of explored area. The Kolem Jaa Ecological Ranch is a reserve of rainforest and springs with sulfur water. It is part of a reforestation effort in the higher elevations of the region. It contains a botanical garden with a large collection of orchids. The La Chontalpa Ecological Reserve is a state protected area on the Colegio de Postgraduado-Campus Tabasco campus founded in 1995 with 277 hectares. It is one of the last remains of the medium growth evergreen rainforest of Tabasco dominated by a tree called "canacoite" (Bravaisia integerrima). The reserve has 247 species of plants with some in danger of extinction. Other plants include cachimbo (Platymiscium yucatanum), tinco (Vatairea lundelii) and zapote prieto (Diospyros digyna). Wildlife includes mammals (20.2%), birds (61.3%), reptiles (10.9%) and amphibians (7.6%). It is located just off the Cárdenas-Coatzacoalco highway.

== Demographics ==
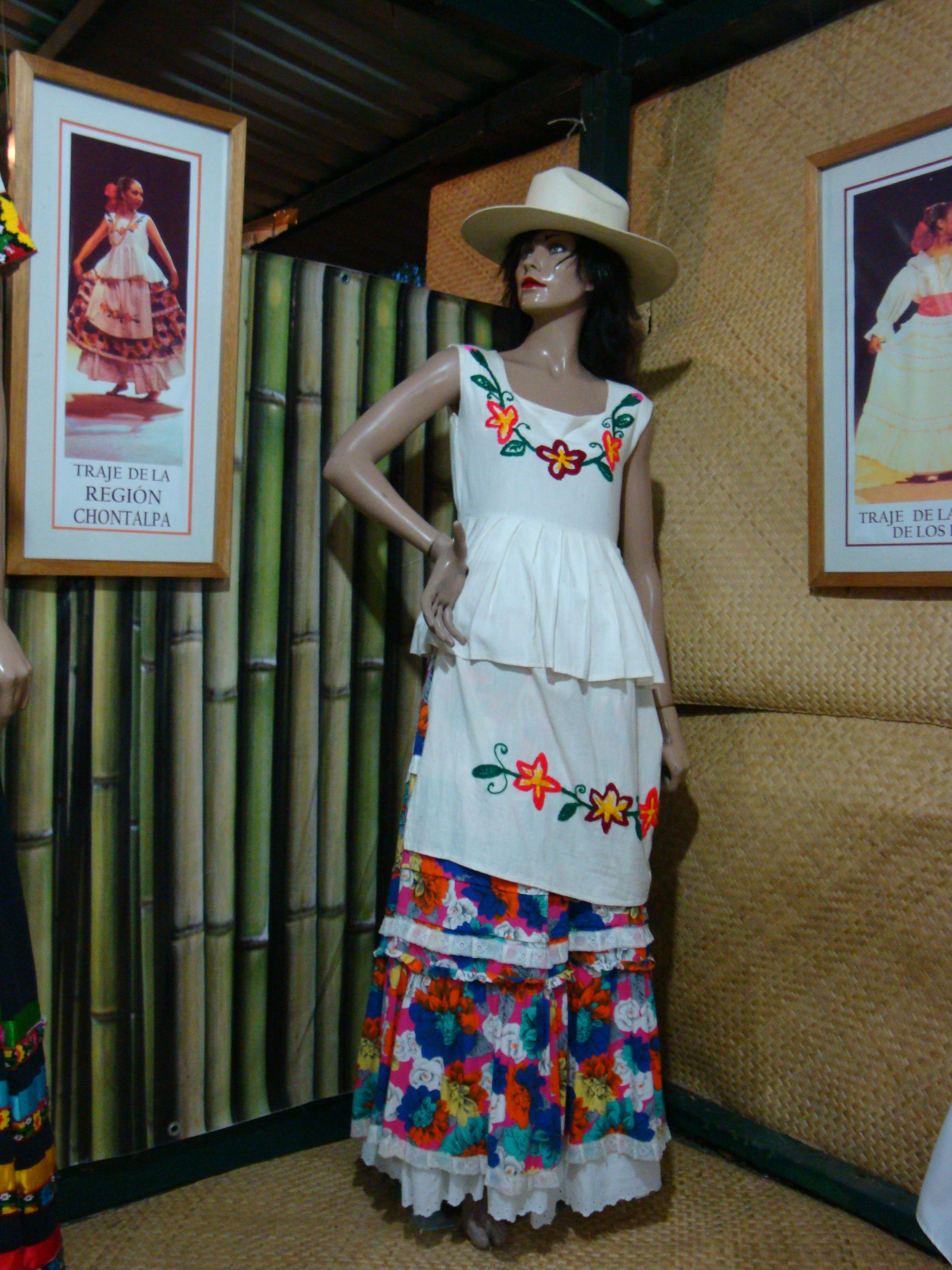
Traditional dress from the Chontalpa region

It has a population of 593,668 with about 41% living in urban areas and the rest in rural areas.

Much of the state's Chontal Maya population is located in the region, especially in the Nacajuca municipality. The name "chontal" comes from Nahuatl and means "foreigner" but their name for themselves is yoko yinikob (true men) and yoko ixikob (true women). They are not related to groups in Guerrero and Oaxaca which are also called Chontals. The name "Chontalpa" is derived from the Nahuatl meaning "land of foreigners." However, the modern region is not defined by the presence of the Chontal Maya but rather by economic considerations. Over seventy percent of the state's Chontal Maya population is divided between the municipalities of Nacajuaca which is in the region and Centro (Villahermosa), which is just outside it. Nacajuca has the largest percentage of indigenous population in the state, with about 37% of the population of Nacajuca speaking Chontal. Estimates of the indigenous population is inexact because the official census only counts speakers of indigenous language and since it is not known how the Chontal Maya define themselves and who is a member of the ethnicity.

Relatively little is known about the Chontal Maya culture and daily life in comparison to other indigenous groups in Mexico. The Chontales lost several aspects of their culture in the 20th century with modernization such as the daily use of traditional clothing and most do not live in traditional houses, rather have houses similar to the rest of Tabasco with running water and electricity. However, the Chontal Maya language perseveres with increases in the number of native speakers in the past decades. The language is of the Mayan family, most closely related to the Ch'ol of Chiapas. Chontal Maya has several mutually intelligible dialects with three main ones, North and Tapotzingo found in and around Nacajuca and a South dialect centered in Macuspana. Most speakers are bilingual, speaking Spanish as well.

== Economy ==
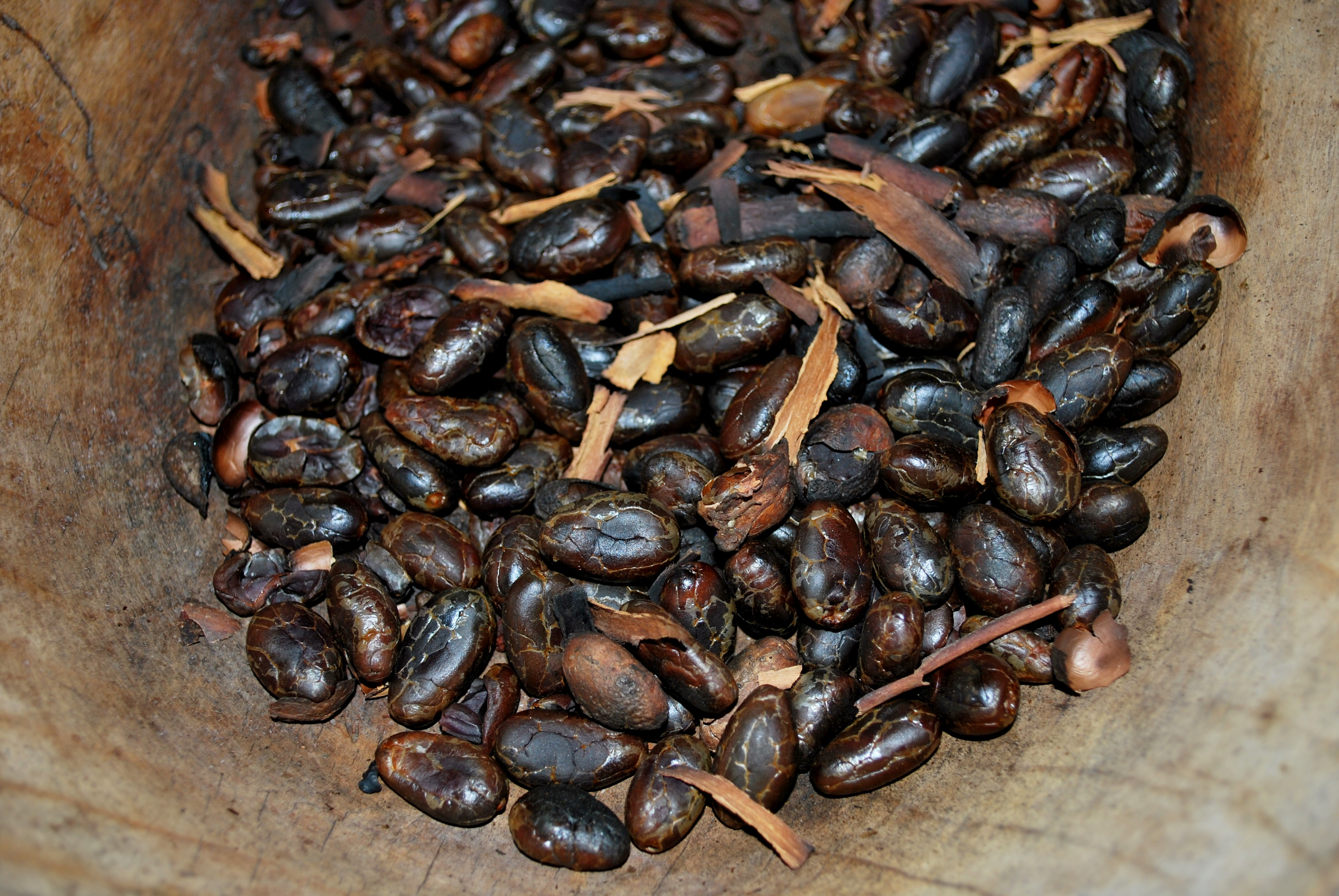
Toasted cacao beans at the La Chonita Hacienda

Natural resources include petroleum deposits, fertile soils, and lakes and shoreline for fishing. The main economic activities of the region are agriculture, livestock and oil drilling. The economic development of the 20th century brought infrastructure such as modern roadways. This led to an abundance of construction jobs, often filled by the Chontal Maya.

Cultivated crops include cacao, coconut, bananas, sugar cane, pineapple, citrus fruits, corn and beans. Mass livestock raising was introduced with the Plan Chontalpa, especially cattle and sheep. One means to exploit the extensive wetlands is through a project to create "camellones chontales" (Chontal ridges). These are based on the ancient Aztec technique of chinampas to create areas of artificial land. The project began in the Chontal village of Tucta in the municipality of Nacajuca in the 1970s. The projects created platforms of land separated by canals. The platforms measure twenty by twenty meters with canals among them to introduce native fish and aquatic plant species for subsistence.

Chontalpa has most of the cacao plantations of Tabasco. One of these is the La Luz Hacienda, which was founded at the beginning of the 20th century, which today offered guided tours. It and others such as the La Chonita Hacienda are part of The Cacao Route. These establishments often offer tours, workshops and other services such as accommodations, food service, recreational activities and more. The route has the only museum dedicated to cacao and chocolate. It also has a number of Chontal communities such Cupilco, the Comalcalco arqueological zone and Paraíso with its beaches.

Most oil drilling occurs around the communities of La Venta, Cárdenas, Paraíso and Cunduacán . The economic boom due to oil has made the cities of Cárdenas and Comalcalco the second and third most important in the state.

== History ==
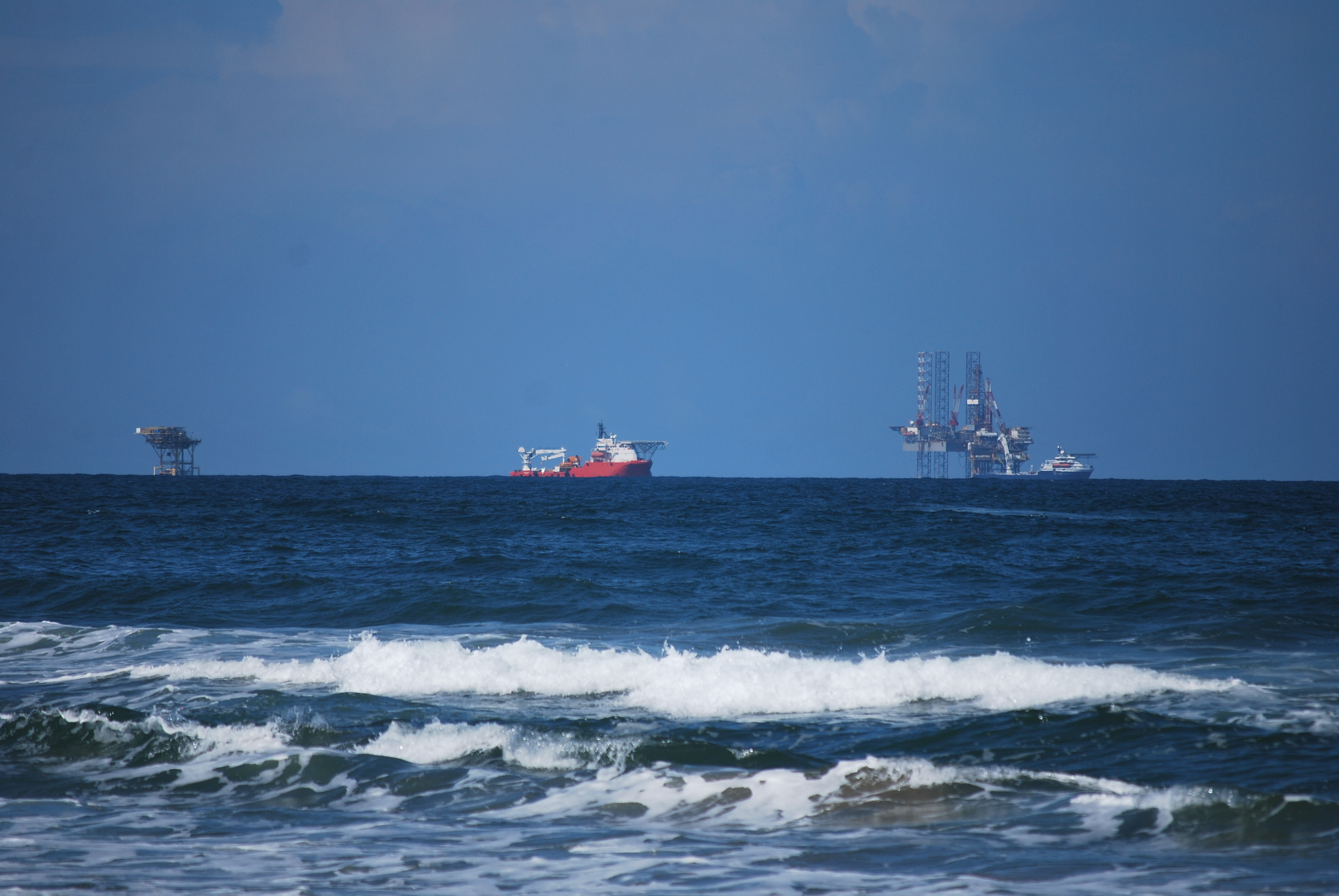
Oil platforms and tanker off Varadero Beach in Paraíso

In the area which is now Chontalpa, various ethnicities such as the Chontal Maya, Zoques and Nahuas inhabited before the arrival of the Spanish. The Chontal Maya were found around the rivers in the flatlands, with the Zoques found in the highland area. The Nahuas were dispersed in various areas. Because of the wetlands created by the flow of the rivers, much of this area was inaccessible for hundreds of years. However, during the colonial period various haciendas were established in the region to produce cacao, livestock and other products. The indigenous population diminished greatly and almost disappeared with estimates of the loss as high as ninety percent due to disease and abuse at the hands of the Spanish. While the area, nor the rest of the state, developed economically as other areas of New Spain, it was still considered important as a transit point and for its production of cacao. Despite Independence, little changed in the area economically until the latter 20th century, mostly due to the discovery of petroleum. Today, most in the region are not employed in agriculture.

Oil drilling began in the 1950s, with the production initially for domestic use. Large scale drilling began in the 1970s for foreign income, controlled by the state oil company PEMEX. It became the major income producer in the 1970s. It also signaled the beginning of ecological damage in the region, although drilling was not the only factor. Environmental damage since this time has affected fishing, agriculture and livestock, leading to tensions between the local population and PEMEX, including legal actions, protests and event the blocking of oil facilities.

Another major factor in the economic development and environmental degradation of the region was the implementation of the Chontalpa Plan. This was a plan introduced by the federal government to develop the hydroelectric potential of the area's rivers, and convert wetlands into those suitable for agricultural production. In 1951, President Miguel Alemán Valdés created the Grijalva River Commission, following similar projects by predecessors for the Papaloapan and Tepalcatepec River areas in the 1940s. One of the goals of this project was to alleviate the poverty of the region due to lack of economic development, especially in rural areas. The project was undertaken in an area not well known to the engineers with the aim of draining and converting to farmland 50,000 hectares or about fifteen hectares per family. Much of the land went for the production of corn, cacao and bananas. The work of the Grijalva River Commission had a substantial impact on the Chontalpa Region especially in its center. It led to the formation of the Unión de Ejidos Colectivos which included various pre existing ejido organization along with state and federal authorities to give farmers credit and other economic assistance. By the 1960s, families in the area were earning twenty times that previously.

The Chontalpa Plan did benefit the families that lived in the wetlands of the Chontalpa area but at the expense of the environment. The destruction of the rainforest in the area was swift with outside mechanized equipment and administration. Although originally promoted as a project for local ejidos, it quickly became controlled by elements of Mexico's elite. Initial expropriation of the wetlands was indiscriminate and those who opposed it were forcibly ejected. The political economic system became oriented towards meeting the interests of outside metropolitan areas.

== Archeology ==
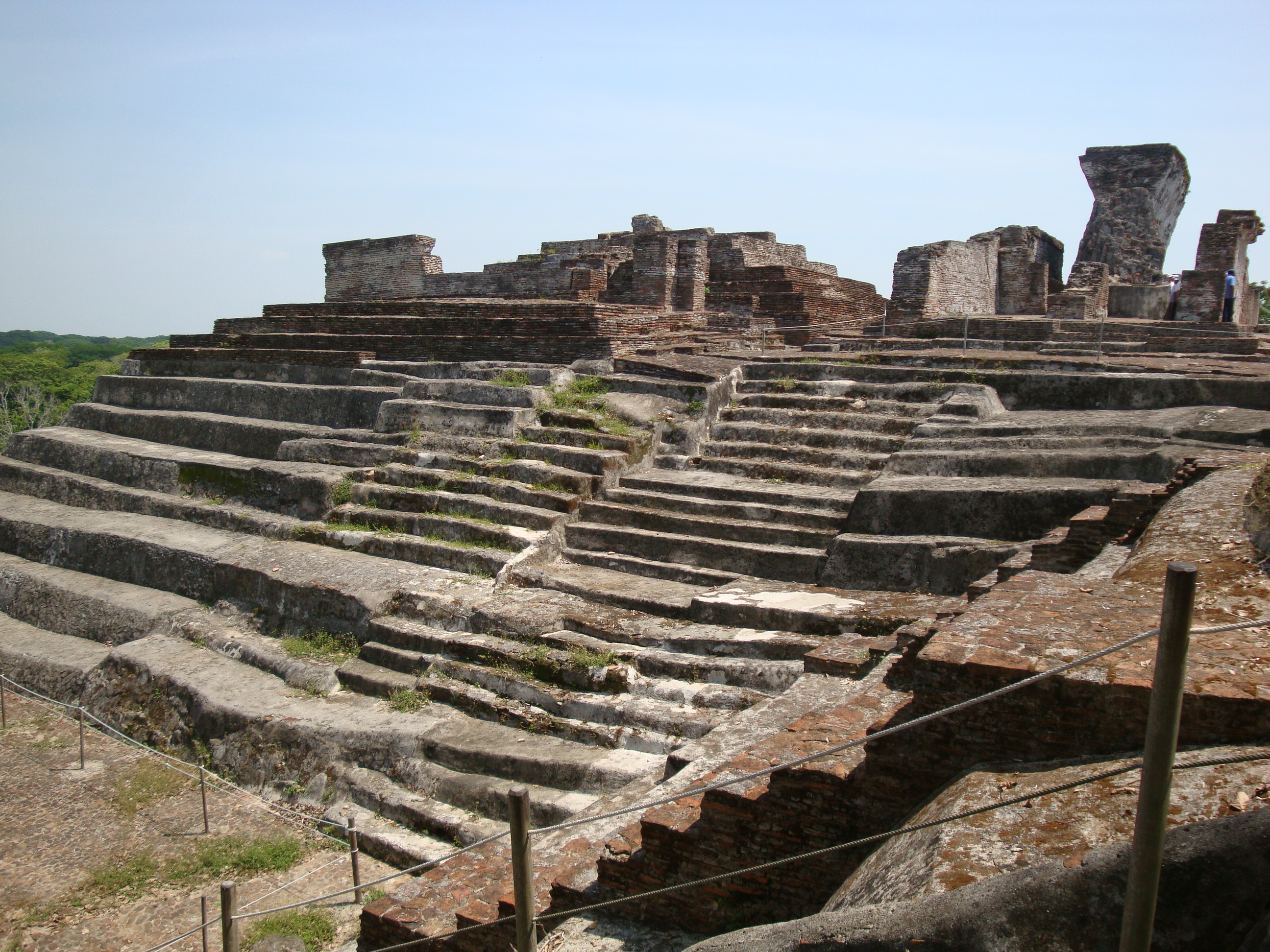
Structure 5 at Comalcalco

Chontalpa is home to the two most important archeological sites in the state, La Venta and Comalcalco, which represent the Olmec and Maya civilizations respectively.

La Venta was the most important civic-religious center of the Olmec civilization, the first major culture of Mesoamerica. The site shows a number of the characteristics of Olmec culture, including depictions of jaguars, colossal heads and images of figures of rotund children. The site dates back to about 1000 BCE and declined around 400 CE, replaced in importance by San Lorenzo. The museum associated with La Venta is in Villahermosa proper called Parque Museo de la Venta. It contain thirty three major pieces from the site and includes displays about Olmec customs, government, astronomy and writing. This park was created in the 1950s by writer Carlos Pellicer to protect the most important pieces of the archeological site. There are also exhibits on the flora and fauna of the area.

The Comalcalco archeological site is in the center of the region. Comalcalco is distinct from other Mayan sites as its monumental structure are made of adobe, rather than stone. There are three main groups of buildings called the North Plaza, the Grand Acropolis and the East Acropolis. The architectural style is similar to Palenque but made with bricks instead of stone. The Grand Acropolis is the most important group of monumental buildings, which are also the tallest. There is a site museum with ceramics and other pieces on display.

Although Comalcalco is the best known Mayan site in Chontalpa, it is not the only one. There are numerous small sites. One of these in Malpasito near the town of Huimanguillo which is identified as both Mayan and Zoque. The main buildings surround a plaza and include a Mesoamerican ball courts and a temazcal. It also includes about sixty stones finely sculpted with figures of animals, humans and geometric designs.
