= Paraíso Municipality =

Paraíso
- Municipality
- Location of the municipality in Tabasco.
- Country: Mexico
- State: Tabasco
- Seat: Paraíso

Area
  - Total: 407.6 km^{2} (157.4 sq mi)

Population (2020)
  - Total: 96,741
- Time zone: UTC-6 (Zona Centro)
- Postal: 86600—86621

Paraíso is a municipality in Tabasco in south-eastern Mexico. The municipal seat is the city of Paraíso.

== Description ==
Paraíso is located in the Grijalva Region of Tabasco, in the subregion of Chontalpa in the north of the state. It borders the municipalities of Centla, Jalpa de Méndez, Comalcalco and Cárdenas with the Gulf of Mexico to the north. It covers a territory of 577.55km2, the smallest in the state, and contains one city (the seat), one town, three villages, ten “colonias,” fourteen ejidos and 25 ranches. It also has seven “Rural Development Centers” in Chiltepec, Ejido Oriente, Francisco I. Madero, La Unión 2a Sección, Nicolás Bravo 1a Sección, Puerto Ceiba and Occidente San Francisco. The municipal government consists of a municipal president, a treasurer, and ten officials called “regidores.” The town has a population of 20,194. The municipality has 257 people who speak an indigenous language with languages such as Chontal, other Mayan dialects and Zapotec.

The local cuisine is rich in seafood especially oysters, crabs, shrimp, snails, and squid. Oysters are most common, mostly served pickled or smoked. Other foods include iguana, freshwater turtle, and grilled pejelagarto fish. Sweets include those made with coconut, pineapple and soursop. The most traditional drink of the area is pozol, usually made with corn and cacao.

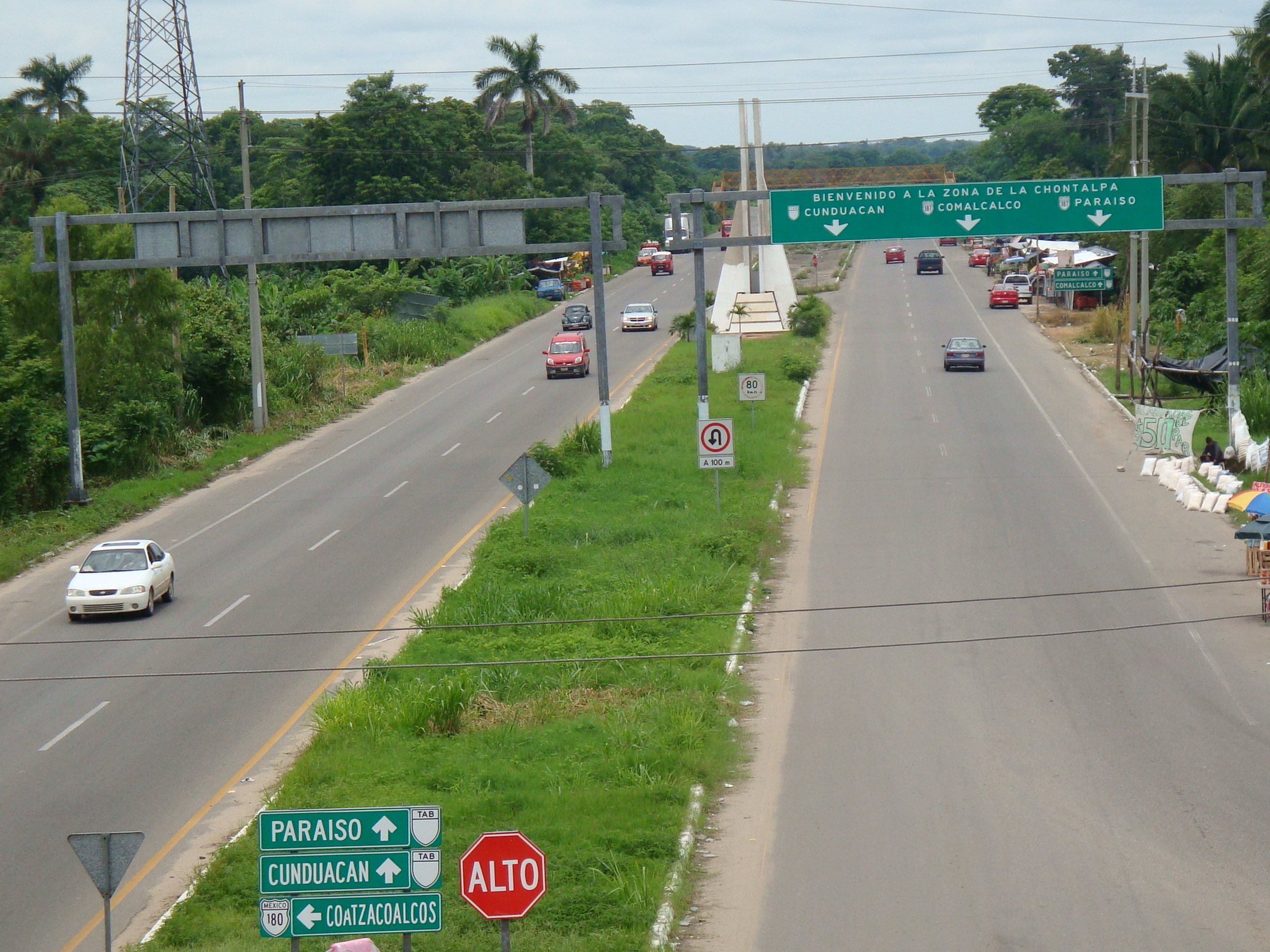
Villahermosa-Comalcalco-Paraíso state highway.

The municipality has a number of local publications including newspapers El Casabel, Horizontes Nacionales, Opinión and one magazine called La Edición. Mass media comes from state, national and satellite outlets.

There are 138 schools from preschool to vocational education which include 59 preschools, 57 primary schools, 16 middle schools, three high schools, three vocational schools, two special education centers, and three work training programs. There are also eleven laboratories, thirty one workshops, nine scholastic libraries and twenty three public libraries. Paraíso's illiteracy rate fell to 4.2 percent in 2008 from 5.9% in 2005.

The municipality has 129.6 km of major roadway, most of which are state highway. There are eighteen vehicular bridges. The main highways include Federal highway 180, the Villahermosa-Comalcalco-Paraíso state highway and the Villahermosa-Jalpa de Méndez-Paraíso state highway. Seat transportation is mostly concentrated at the Dos Bocas port. There is a mall highway that links the town of Paraíso with the port of Dos Bocas. There used to be a road connection between Paraíso and the port of Sánchez Magallanes, but this road has been washed out in places. A rail line between the Dos Bocas port and Villa Chontalpa is under construction. There is an intercity bus terminal and local public transport consisting of vans, small buses and taxis.

Chiltepec has a population of about 3,700 people, located 18 km outside of the municipal seat. Its main economic activities is the growing of coconut, fishing and tourism. It is a fishing port on the mouth of the González River, with the Playa Bruja and Playa Pirata. The town has a rustic dock and boardwalk with benches and a lighthouse.

Quintín Arauz has a population of about 3,500 located 2.5 km outside of the municipal seat. It is dedicated to the growing of coconut, cacao and pepper as well as the raising of pigs and domestic fowl. Puerto Ceiba has a population of about 2,500 people and is six km from the municipal seat. Its main economic activities are fishing and tourism.

Libertad 1ª. Sección has a population of about 1,800 people located 5.5 km outside of the municipal seat. Its main economic activities are the growing of coconut, cacao and pepper along with the raising of pigs and domestic fowl.

Francisco I. Madero has a population of about 2000 people, located 7.5 km outside of the municipal seat. Its main economic activities are the growing of coconut, cacao and pepper along with the raising of pigs and domestic fowl.

El Bellote is a small community on the shore of the Mecoacán Lagoon which is dedicated to fishing and tourism.
