= UPCH =

UPCH may refer to:

- Cayetano Heredia University (Spanish: Universidad Peruana Cayetano Heredia), Lima, Peru
- Universidad Popular de la Chontalpa, Cárdenas, Mexico
- UPCH, catalog designation for Nayutawave Records, now part of EMI Records Japan
