= Rafael Domínguez =

Rafael Domínguez Gamas (Cárdenas, Tabasco, February 14, 1883 -Veracruz, Veracruz, January 23, 1959) was a Mexican academic, journalist, lawyer and writer. He was a member of Academia Mexicana de la Lengua.

He studied laws at the Instituto Juárez, where he was also a professor. He also managed schools in several towns in Tabasco. He published in the journals Alba, El Renacimiento and El Eco de Tabasco. In 1914, he moved to Veracruz, where he worked for the journal El Dictamen.

== Works ==
- Un recuerdo de Solferino
- Añoranzas del Instituto Juárez
- Azul como tus ojos: cuentos y pasatiempos literarios, 1925.
- Veracruz en el ensueño y el recuerdo: apuntes de la vida jarocha, 1946.
- Páginas sueltas: entretenimientos literarios, 1946.
- Diccionario general de gentilicios, 1948.
- Tierra mía, 1949.
- El ideal de servir, 1957.
- Ensayos críticos de lenguaje
