= Anemia tabascana =

Scientific classification
- Kingdom: Plantae
- Clade: Tracheophytes
- Division: Polypodiophyta
- Class: Polypodiopsida
- Order: Schizaeales
- Family: Anemiaceae
- Genus: Anemia
- Species: A. tabascana

Binomial name
- Anemia tabascana Carv.-Hern., E. E. Cord. & T. Krömer

Species of fern

Anemia tabascana is a fern endemic to the state of Tabasco, Mexico. It grows on road banks on a single hill in Huimanguillo. Like other members of the genus, its leaves are pinnately divided into a single set of leaflets; in fertile leaves, the lowest pair of leaflets projects at right angles to the rest of the leaf and bears spores. The freely forking veins, which do not rejoin one another after forking, and sparse, rather than abundant, hairs on the leaf axes, distinguish it from similar species in the genus.

== Description ==
The rhizomes are short and upright, from 7 to 11 millimeters (0.28 to 0.43 in) in diameter. They bear light brown, septate hairs about 1.3 millimeters (0.051 in) long, which extend onto the stipe (the stalk of the leaf, below the blade). The leaves as a whole measure 50 to 90 centimeters (20 to 35 in), of which 20 to 43 centimeters (7.9 to 17 in) are made up by the stipe, which is usually from one-half to one-third of the total length. The stipes are 0.2 to 0.6 millimeters (0.008 to 0.02 in) and straw-colored. The brown hairs typically extend less than halfway up the stipe, but may go further, particularly in young leaves; by contrast, they may disappear on older leaves.

The leaf blades are shaped like a long, narrow triangle, and are pinnately divided into a single set of pinnae (leaflets). The blades are 20 to 48 centimeters (7.9 to 19 in) long and 8 to 17 centimeters (3.1 to 6.7 in) wide. The blade tapers gradually to the tip, which is pointed and does not resemble the pinnae. Each blade has 10 to 14 pairs of pinnae, which are 5 to 10 centimeters (2.0 to 3.9 in) long and 1.5 to 3 centimeters (0.59 to 1.2 in) wide. They are opposite one another, or nearly so, on the rachis (leaf axis), and each has a short stalk (1 to 3.5 centimeters (0.39 to 1.4 in)) which is prolonged into a distinct costa (pinna midrib). The lowest pinnae are strongly inequilateral, with the acroscopic side (the side towards the leaf tip) longer than the basiscopic side (the side towards the leaf base); the pinnae bases are distinctly asymmetric, being rounded on the acroscopic side and cut away and wedge-shaped on the basiscopic side. Overall, they are lance-shaped to oval, with acute to obtuse tips. The pinna margins bear small teeth or are irregularly jagged. The veins are free (they do not rejoin one another after forking), one of the distinctive characteristics of the species. They fork two or three times and are slightly raised above the upper surface of the leaf.

The leaf tissue is neither particularly leathery nor delicate. The underside of the leaves are free of hairs and scales. On the upper surface, a few small light brown septate hairs can be found along the leaf axes, extending from the base onto the veins of the pinnae. In a few pinnae, scattered hairs will continue along the veins, and occasionally between veins, towards the edge of the leaf, becoming shorter, more colorless, and curved as they occur further from the axis.

Like other members of the genus, in fertile leaves, the lowest pair of pinnae is highly modified to bear spores, projecting upwards at a right angle or nearly so to the rest of the blade. The fertile pinna stalks are about 3 to 9 centimeters (1 to 4 in) long, and the total length of the fertile pinnae 11 to 21 centimeters (4.3 to 8.3 in), ranging from one-third the length of the sterile blade to somewhat exceeding it. The blade tissue in the fertile pinnae is highly reduced and dissected and curled around the sori. The spores are covered in smooth, closely spaced ridges.

=== Identification ===
The free, rather than anastomosing, veins of the leaves, and the sparse, rather than abundant hairs on the axes, distinguish A. tabascana from the similar A. phylliditis and A. × paraphyllitidis. It is also similar to A. nicaraguensis, but the latter has more abundant hairs on the axes, fewer pinnae with rounded tips, and usually has fertile pinnae longer than the sterile blade.

== Taxonomy ==
Anemia tabascana was described by Carvajal-Hernández, Córdova-Hernández and Krömer in 2020, based on a specimen collected in Huimanguillo by Córdova-Hernández and Burelo-Ramos. The epithet "tabascana" was chosen to reflect its origins in the state of Tabasco. It belongs to the subgenus Anemia.

== Distribution and habitat ==
So far, the species has only been collected from a single hill, the Cerro La Antena, in Huimanguillo, Tabasco. It grows on soil in road banks, in an area that was tropical rainforest, or tropical rainforest transitioning to humid montane forest, but which has largely been converted to grassland.

== Notes and references ==
=== Works cited ===
- Carvajal-Hernández, César I.; Córdova-Hernández, Ena E.; Krömer, Thorsten; Burelo-Ramos, Carlos M. (2020). "Anemia tabascana (Anemiaceae), a new species from southeastern Mexico". American Fern Journal. 110 (2): 51–57. doi:10.1640/0002-8444-110.2.51. S2CID 218972912.
