= Francisco Sánchez Ramos =

Mexican politician

- Born: 4 October 1970 (age 55); Huimanguillo, Tabasco, Mexico
- Occupation: Politician
- Political party: PRD
- Children: Jorge Rabelo Sánchez

Francisco Sánchez Ramos (born 4 October 1970) is a Mexican politician from the Party of the Democratic Revolution (PRD). In the 2006 general election he was elected to the Chamber of Deputies to represent Tabasco's 2nd district during the 60th session of Congress.
