= Karla María Rabelo Estrada =

Mexican politician

Karla María Rabelo Estrada (born March 15, 1984) is a Mexican politician. From September 1, 2021, to August 31, 2024, she was a deputy in the 65th session of the Congress of the Union. Originally elected for the National Regeneration Movement (Morena), she switched to the Citizens' Movement (MC) on 5 March 2024.

== Early years ==
Karla María Rabelo Estrada was born in Villahermosa, Tabasco, in 1984. From 2002 to 2006, she studied law at the Universidad del Valle de Mexico. She worked as a social issues journalist at the Tabasco Hoy newspaper from 2002 to 2012.

== Political career ==
In the 2018 Tabasco state elections, she was elected as a deputy of the 63rd session of the Congress of the State of Tabasco, representing local district 16, based in Huimanguillo. Within Congress, she was president of the Commission of Governance and Constitutional Points. In the 2021 federal elections, she was elected as deputy of the 65th session of the Congress of the Union representing district 2 of the state of Tabasco, based in the city of Heroica Cárdenas. She served as the secretary of the Constitutional Points Commission within the Congress.
