= Tomás Brito Lara =

Mexican politician

- Born: 11 January 1958 (age 68); Cárdenas, Tabasco, Mexico
- Occupation: Politician
- Political party: PRD

Tomás Brito Lara (born 11 January 1958) is a Mexican politician affiliated with the Party of the Democratic Revolution (PRD). In the 2012 general election he was elected to the Chamber of Deputies to represent Tabasco's 2nd district during the 62nd session of Congress.
