= Luis Felipe Madrigal =

Mexican politician

- Born: 19 August 1948 (age 77); Huimanguillo, Tabasco, Mexico
- Occupation: Politician
- Political party: PRI

Luis Felipe Madrigal Hernández (born 19 August 1948) is a Mexican politician affiliated with the Institutional Revolutionary Party (PRI). In the 2003 mid-terms he was elected to the Chamber of Deputies to represent Tabasco's 2nd district during the 59th session of Congress.
