= 2nd federal electoral district of Tabasco =

Federal electoral district of Mexico

Tabasco's 2nd
- Electoral district of the Chamber of Deputies of Mexico

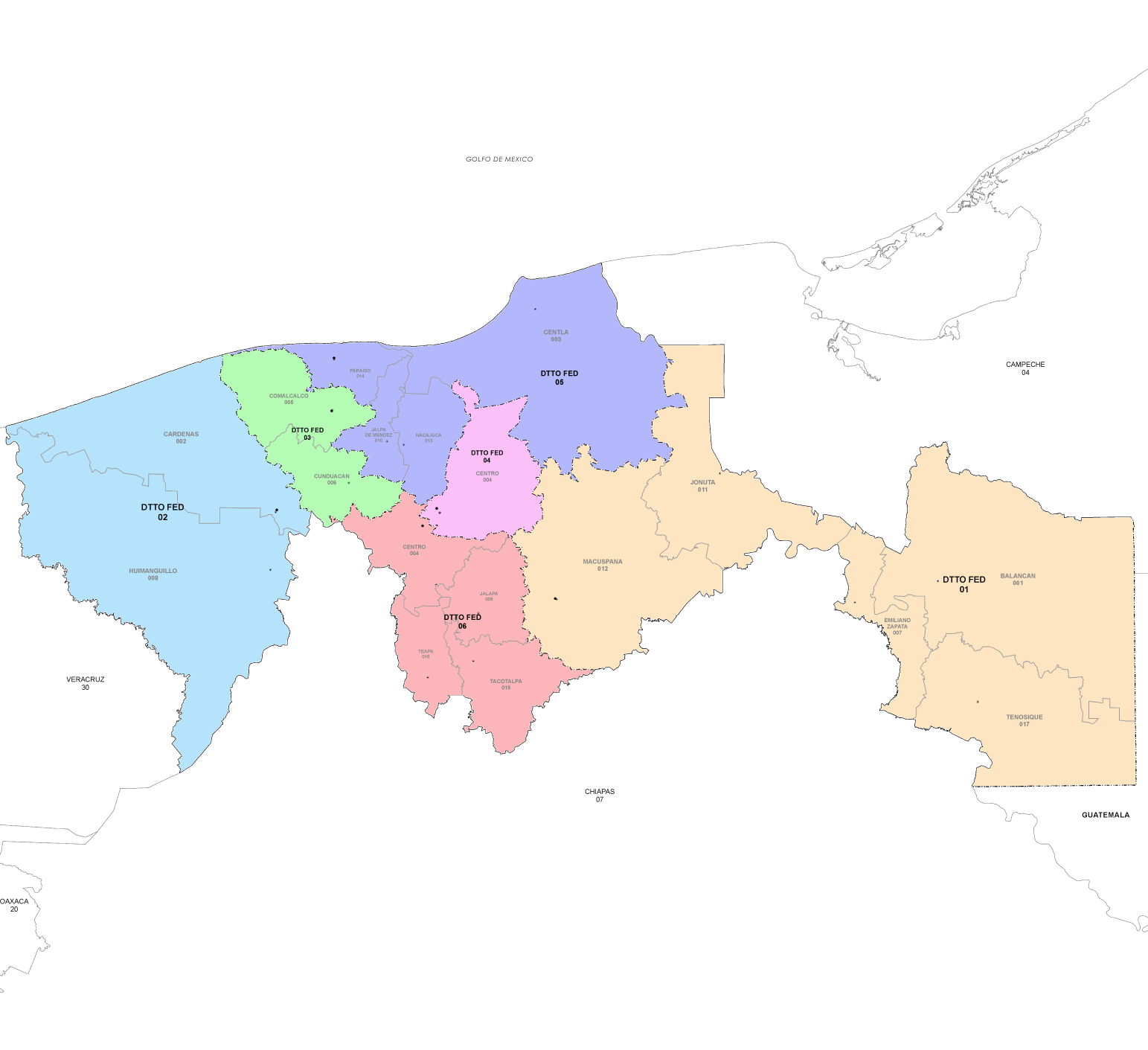
- 2nd district

Incumbent
- Member: Iván Peña Vidal
- Party: ▌Morena
- Congress: 66th (2024–2027)

District
- State: Tabasco
- Head town: Heroica Cárdenas
- Coordinates: 17°59′N 93°22′W
- Covers: Cárdenas, Huimanguillo
- PR region: Third
- Precincts: 219
- Population: 433,301 (2020 census)

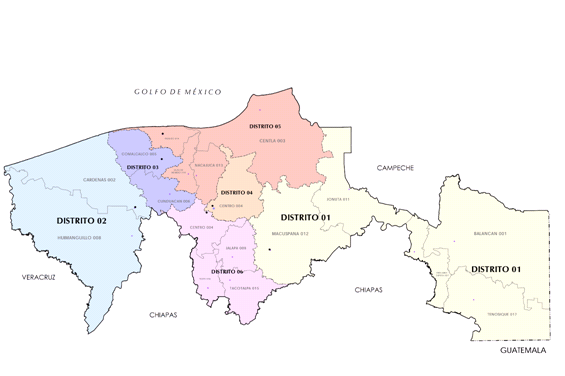
Tabasco's districts in 2017–2022

The 2nd federal electoral district of Tabasco (Spanish: Distrito electoral federal 02 de Tabasco) is one of the 300 electoral districts into which Mexico is divided for elections to the federal Chamber of Deputies and one of six such districts in the state of Tabasco.

It elects one deputy to the lower house of Congress for each three-year legislative session by means of the first-past-the-post system. Votes cast in the district also count towards the calculation of proportional representation ("plurinominal") deputies elected from the third region.

The current member for the district, elected in the 2024 general election, is Iván Peña Vidal of the National Regeneration Movement (Morena).

== District territory ==
Under the 2023 districting plan adopted by the National Electoral Institute (INE), which is to be used for the 2024, 2027 and 2030 federal elections, Tabasco's 2nd district is in the west and covers 219 electoral precincts (secciones electorales) across two of the state's municipalities:

- Cárdenas and Huimanguillo.

The head town (cabecera distrital), where results from individual polling stations are gathered together and tallied, is the city of Heroica Cárdenas. The district reported a population of 433,301 in the 2020 census.

== Previous districting schemes ==
Evolution of electoral district numbers
| | 1974 | 1978 | 1996 | 2005 | 2017 | 2023 |
|---|---|---|---|---|---|---|
| Tabasco | 3 | 5 | 6 | 6 | 6 | 6 |
| Chamber of Deputies | 196 | 300 | | | | |

2017–2022

From 2017 to 2022, the district had the same configuration as in the 2023 scheme.

2005–2017

Under the 2005 plan, the district's head town was at Heroica Cárdenas and it covered Huimanguillo in its entirety and the bulk of Cárdenas (29 precincts in the south-east corner were assigned to the 3rd district).

1996–2005

Tabasco gained its 6th district in the 1996 redistricting process. The 2nd covered the municipalities of Huimanguillo and Cárdenas in their entirety, with the head town at Heroica Cárdenas.

1978–1996

The districting scheme in force from 1978 to 1996 was the result of the 1977 electoral reforms, which increased the number of single-member seats in the Chamber of Deputies from 196 to 300. Under that plan, Tabasco's seat allocation rose from three to five. The district's head town was at Centla and it comprised the municipalities of Balancán, Centla, Emiliano Zapata, Jalpa de Méndez, Jonuta, Nacajuca and Tenosique.

== Deputies returned to Congress ==
(Mexico) National parties
- Current
- PAN
- PRI
- PT
- PVEM
- MC
- Morena
- PAZ
- Somos
- Defunct or local only
- PLM
- PNR
- PRM
- PNM
- PP
- PPS
- PARM
- PFCRN
- CON
- PANAL
- PSD
- PES
- PES
- PRD

Tabasco's 2nd district
| Election | Deputy | Party | Term | Legislature |
|---|---|---|---|---|
| 1916 | Antenor Sala; Santiago Ocampo | | 1916–1917 | Constituent Congress of Querétaro |
...
| 1973 | Humberto Hernández Haddad | Institutional Revolutionary Party | 1973–1976 | 49th Congress |
| 1976 | Roberto Madrazo Pintado | Institutional Revolutionary Party | 1976–1979 | 50th Congress |
| 1979 | Ángel Mario Martínez Zentella | Institutional Revolutionary Party | 1979–1982 | 51st Congress |
| 1982 | Óscar Cantón Zetina | Institutional Revolutionary Party | 1982–1985 | 52nd Congress |
| 1985 | Manuel Urrutia Castro | Institutional Revolutionary Party | 1985–1988 | 53rd Congress |
| 1988 | Darvin González Ballina | Institutional Revolutionary Party | 1988–1991 | 54th Congress |
| 1991 | Héctor Argüello López | Institutional Revolutionary Party | 1991–1994 | 55th Congress |
| 1994 | José de la Cruz Martínez López | Institutional Revolutionary Party | 1994–1997 | 56th Congress |
| 1997 | Abenamar de la Fuente Lazo | Institutional Revolutionary Party | 1997–2000 | 57th Congress |
| 2000 | Enrique Priego Oropeza (Note: Priego Oropeza took a leave of absence from his congressional duties from 10 January 2001 to 9 January 2002. During that time, he served as interim governor of Tabasco and was replaced in Congress by his alternate, Jiménez Olán.); Neftalí Jiménez Olán | Institutional Revolutionary Party | 2000–2003; 2001–2002 | 58th Congress |
| 2003 | Luis Felipe Madrigal Hernández | Institutional Revolutionary Party | 2003–2006 | 59th Congress |
| 2006 | Francisco Sánchez Ramos | Party of the Democratic Revolution | 2006–2009 | 60th Congress |
| 2009 | María Estela de la Fuente Dagdug | Institutional Revolutionary Party | 2009–2012 | 61st Congress |
| 2012 | Tomás Brito Lara | Party of the Democratic Revolution | 2012–2015 | 62nd Congress |
| 2015 | Óscar Ferrer Ávalos | Party of the Democratic Revolution | 2015–2018 | 63rd Congress |
| 2018 | Teresa Burelo Cortazar | National Regeneration Movement | 2018–2021 | 64th Congress |
| 2021 | Karla María Rabelo Estrada (Note: Originally elected for Morena, Rabelo Estrada switched to the Citizens' Movement on 5 March 2024.) | National Regeneration Movement Citizens' Movement (Mexico) | 2021–2024 | 65th Congress |
| 2024 | Iván Peña Vidal | National Regeneration Movement | 2024–2027 | 66th Congress |

=== Results ===
The corresponding page on the Spanish-language Wikipedia contains results of the congressional elections since 2003.

== Presidential elections ==
Tabasco's 2nd district
| Election | District won by | Party or coalition | % |
|---|---|---|---|
| 2018 | Andrés Manuel López Obrador | Juntos Haremos Historia | 76.2157 |
| 2024 | Claudia Sheinbaum Pardo | Sigamos Haciendo Historia | 81.2303 |
