= Rabelo =

Rabelo is a surname. Notable people with the surname include:

- Karla María Rabelo Estrada (born 1984), Mexican politician
- Laurindo Rabelo (1826–1864), Brazilian poet, teacher, and physician
- Lucas Rabelo (born 1999), Brazilian skateboarder
- Mike Rabelo (born 1980), American baseball player
- Pedro Rabelo (1868–1905), Brazilian journalist, short story writer, and poet
- Renato Rabelo (1942–2026), Brazilian politician and physician

== See also ==
- Rabelo boat
