= María Estela de la Fuente =

Mexican politician

María Estela de la Fuente Dagdug
- Born: 28 June 1966 (age 59); Tabasco, Mexico
- Occupation: Politician
- Political party: PRI (1990–2012)

María Estela de la Fuente Dagdug (born 28 June 1966) is a Mexican politician formerly from the Institutional Revolutionary Party (PRI). In the 2009 mid-terms she was elected to the Chamber of Deputies to represent Tabasco's 2nd district during the 61st session of Congress for the PRI.

She later resigned her membership in the PRI.

She is the daughter of Abenamar de la Fuente Lazo, who also represented Tabasco's 2nd in the Chamber of Deputies for the PRI in 1997–2000.
