= La Chonita Hacienda =

Farm in Tabasco, Mexico

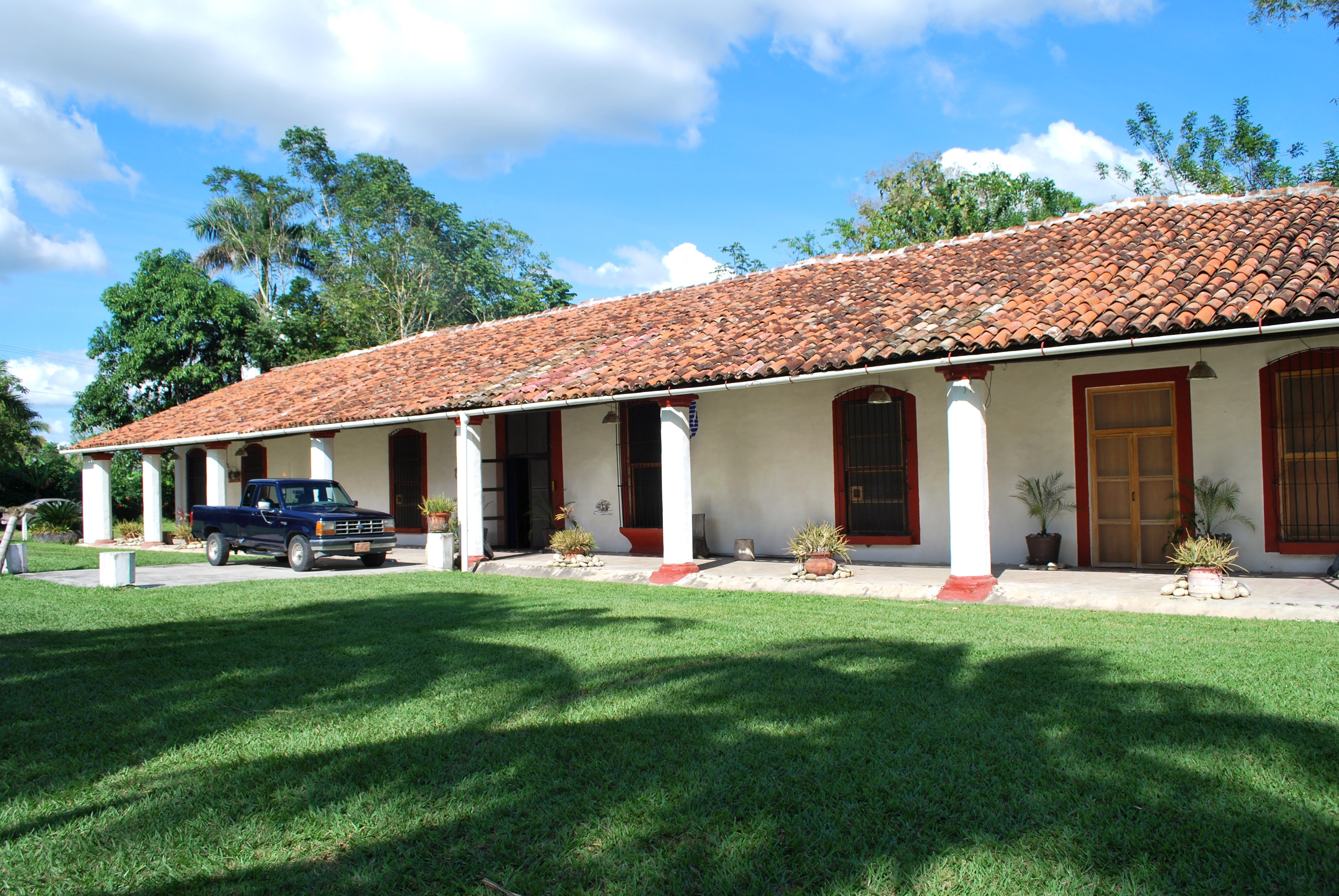
Main house of La Chonita

La Chonita is a former hacienda, established in 1800, which is still a working cacao and sugar cane farm along with some tourist services. It is located in the Mexican state of Tabasco and is part of the Cacao Route that the state promotes. While it is much smaller than it was before the Mexican Revolution, it still produces cacao and sugar cane along with organic earthworms for composting. The former main house for the hacienda is now a youth hostel and dormitory for students and the site provides a number of other tourism services.

== History ==
The hacienda’s establishment has been dated to the year 1800, but little has been written about it. Oral tradition states that it was originally called La Chona in reference to the hundreds of acres of lands that originally belonged to it. In the 19th century, the hacienda was the property of the Cruces family, with the first known owner being Benito Cruces, the father of Santiago Cruces Zentella, the governor of Tabasco in the 1870s. The hacienda lost most of its lands during the Mexican Revolution and is now called La Chonita (“little Chona”). Much of the former property is now La Chonita Ejido. The main hacienda house, along with 30 hectares (0.30 km^{2}) of property now belongs to a family named Fernández.

== Description ==
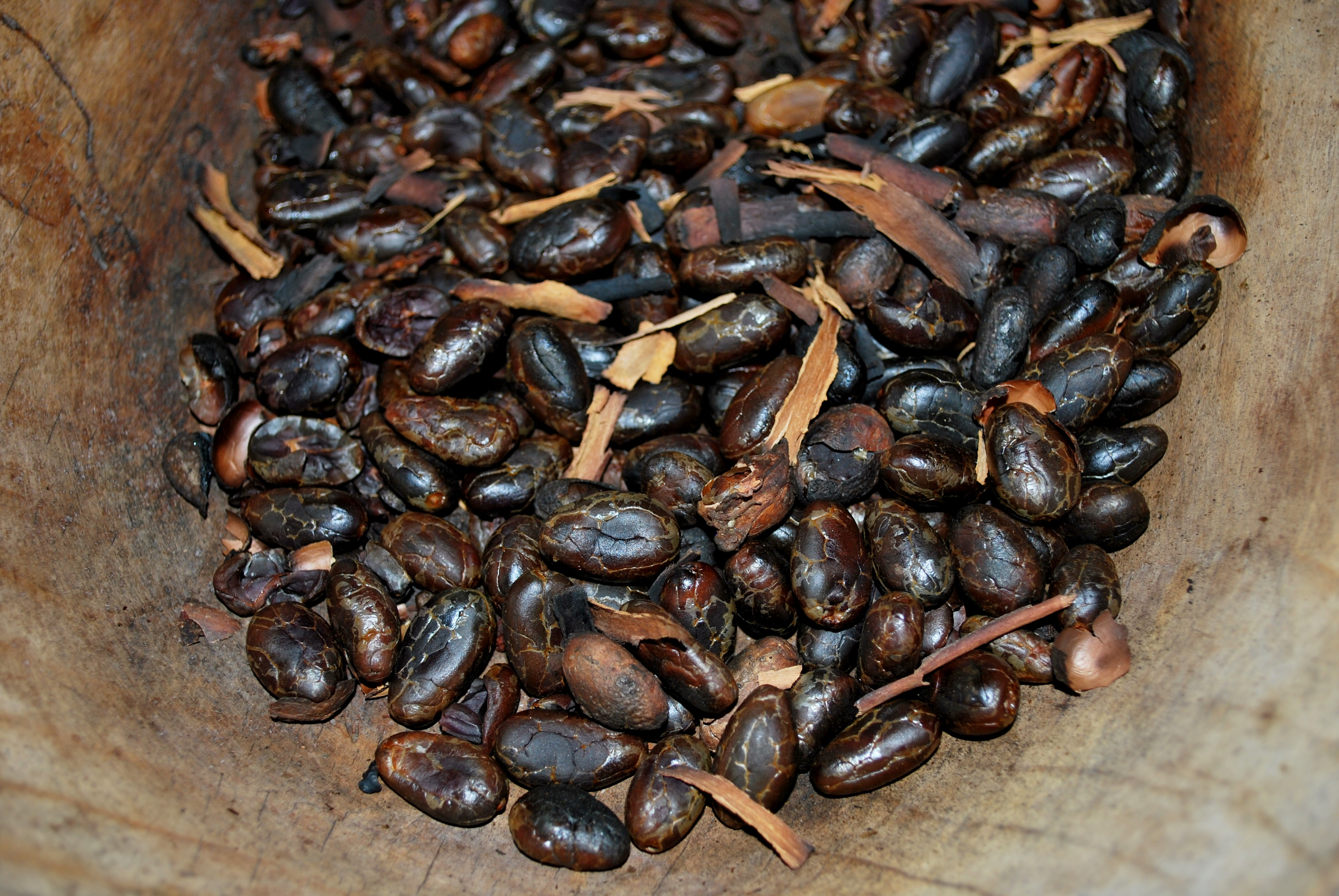
Toasted cacao beans produced at the hacienda

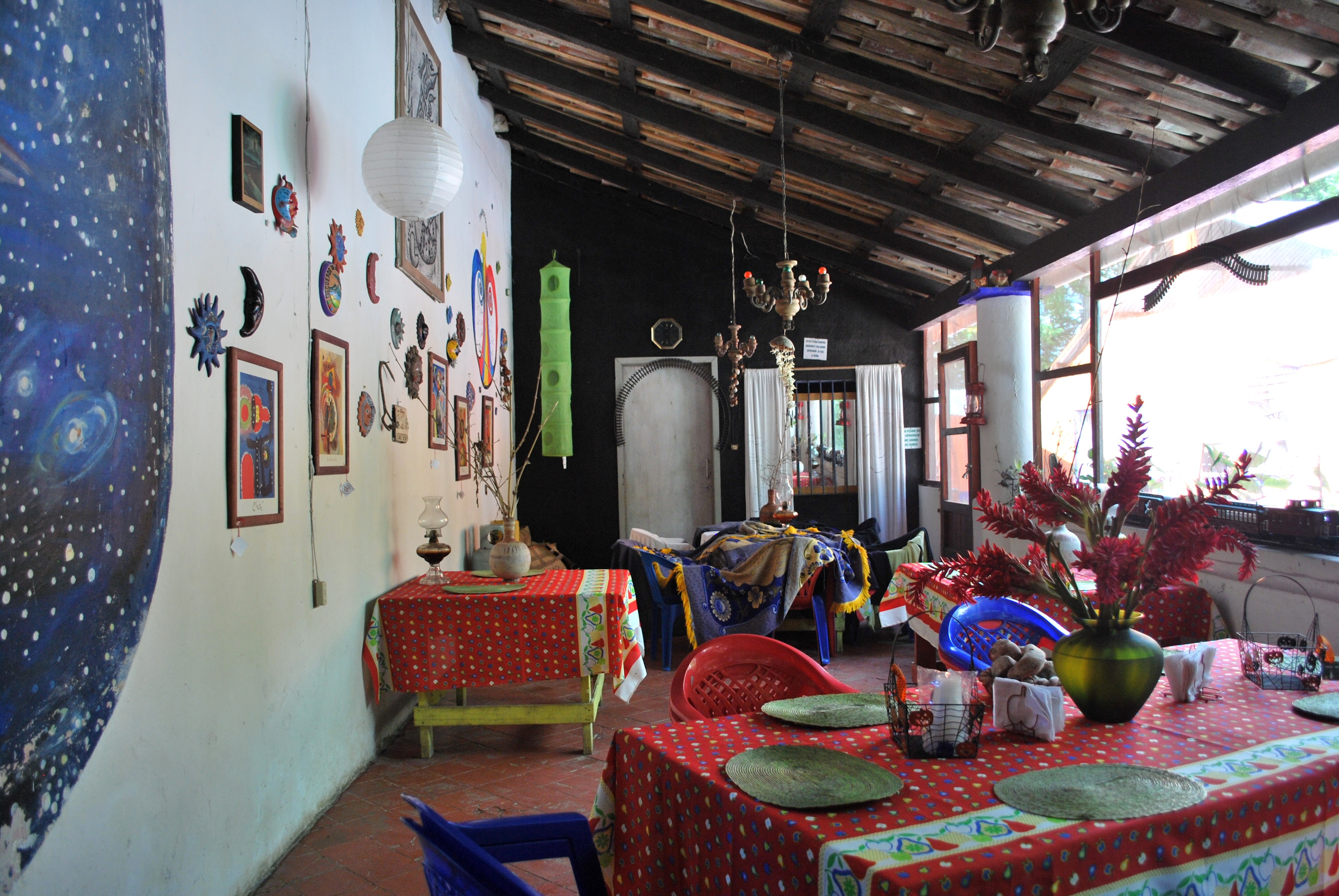
Dining area inside the main house

The hacienda extends over thirty hectares located in the municipality of Cunduacán in the Chontalpa region of Tabasco. It is part of the Cacao Route along with various other chocolate haciendas such as La Luz and Jesús María and the Comalcalco (archaeological site) archeological site. Today it is the property of Benito and Alfonso Fernández, who have preserved the house almost completely intact. The main room of the house contains photography done by former owner Santiago Cruces, as well as preserved specimens of a serpent locally called mazacoatl. The front yard has a small deep well, an old sugar mill and an area dedicated to the raising of earthworms. The hacienda grows cacao and sugar cane. Another important industry is the raising of organic earthworms for composting. In a closed section in the back of the property, iguanas, alligators and Central American river turtles are allowed to reproduce each year.

It offers various services such as environmental education, workshops on how to prepare chocolate from cacao, Frisbee golf, classes on the plants and animals of Tabasco, bicycle and kayak rentals, fishing, camping and lodging. The hacienda sells chocolate products and local handcrafts. It is a youth hostel and it also provides student housing during the school year. It offers tours of its cacao and sugar fields.

The temazcal sauna is relatively unknown in Tabasco although it was used by the Mayas. It is constructed to resemble a return to the maternal womb, spiritually that of Mother Earth. The hacienda has two temazcals, a more modern one with a cement roof and the other more traditional with a clay roof. It also has a building dedicated to recreational and therapeutic massage as well as space for indigenous inspired rites.
