= Tacotalpa =

Town in the Mexican state of Tabasco

- Municipal seat
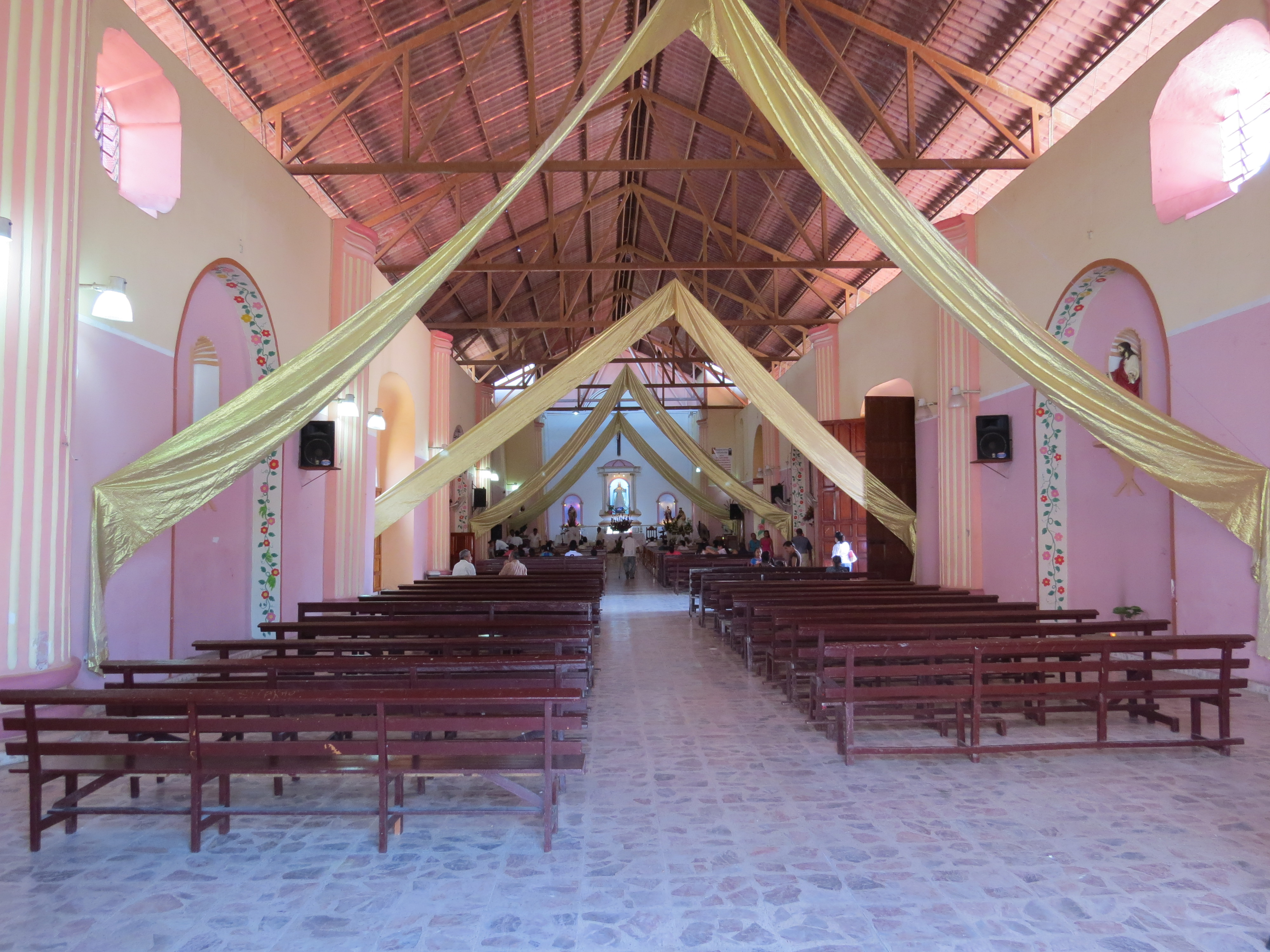
- Interior of the Iglesia de la Virgen de la Asunción, completed in 1710, it is the oldest church in the State of Tabasco

- Location within Tabasco Location within Mexico
- Coordinates: 17°35′35″N 92°49′33″W
- Country: Mexico
- State: Tabasco
- Municipality: Tacotalpa

Government
  - Federal electoral district: Tabasco's 6th
- Elevation: 900 m (3,000 ft)

Population (2010)
  - Total: 8,071
- Time zone: UTC−6 (Central)
- Postal code: 86890

Tacotalpa is a small town in the southern Mexican state of Tabasco, the seat of the municipality of the same name. The city is located about 160 km (100 mi) miles south of the coast of the Gulf of Mexico, and about 50 km (31 mi) kilometers from the state capital Villahermosa, near the border with the state of Chiapas. Tacotalpa is located near the Usumacinta River. In 2020, the population of the town consisted of 7,710 inhabitants.

== Population ==
The city of Tacotalpa currently has a population of 7,710 inhabitants, being one of the two smallest municipal capitals in Tabasco (INEGI 2020).

== Place names ==
Its name comes from the Nahuatl word Taco-tlal-pan, which means "land of brambles or weeds". During the colonial era, when it was declared the capital of the province of Tabasco in 1677, the mayor Diego de Loyola founded the town with the name of Tacotalpa de la Real Corona.
