= Tapijulapa =

Community in the Mexican state of Tabasco

Coordinates: 17°27′43.41″N 92°46′40.48″W

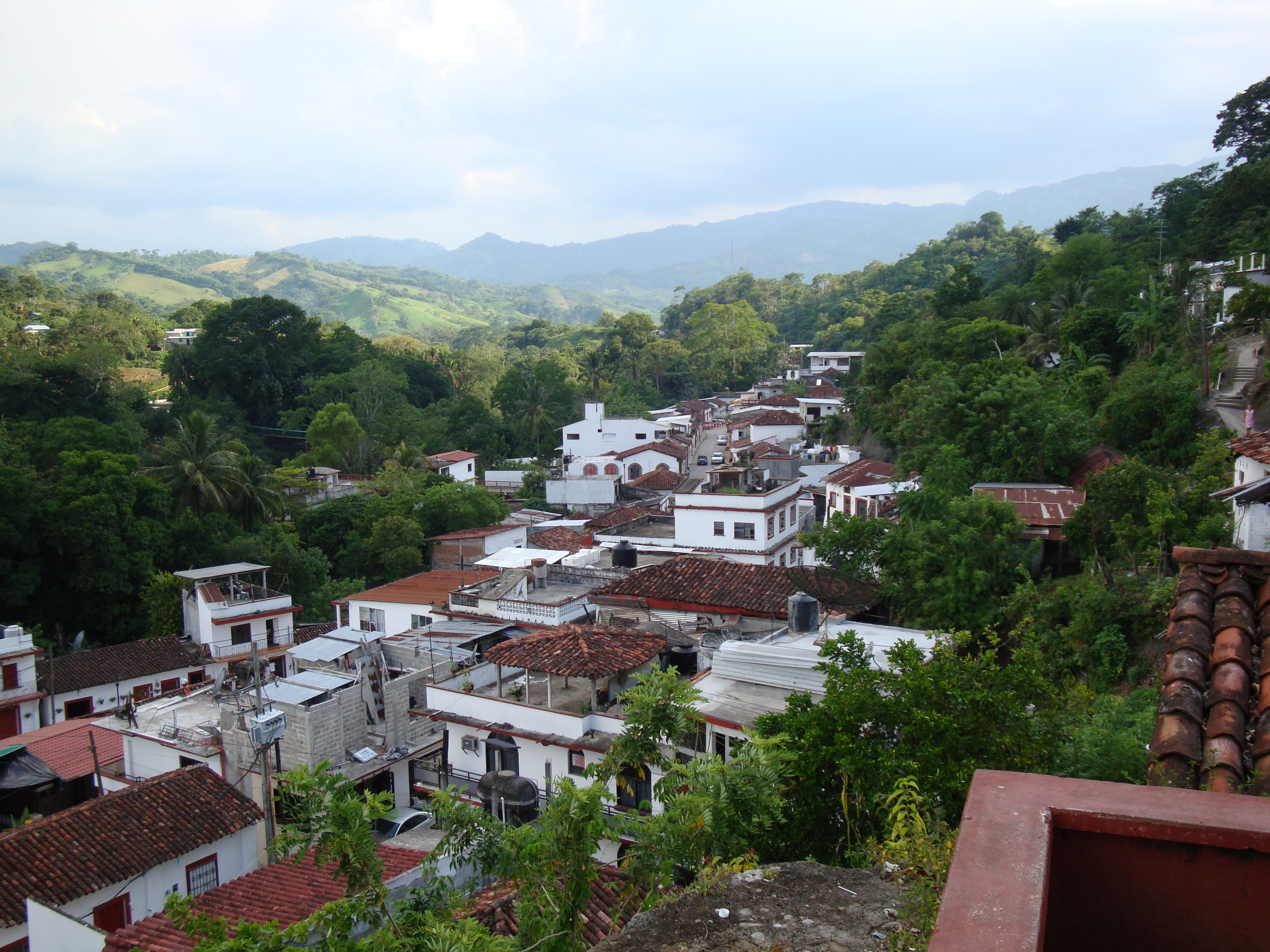
View of the town

Tapijulapa (Spanish: [tapixuˈlapa]) is a community in the municipality of Tacotalpa, Tabasco. It is a mountain community ninety kilometres from the state capital of Villahermosa, named a Pueblo Mágico (Magical Town) for its white houses with red tiles roofs along cobblestone streets, along with abundant vegetation. Its main landmark is the town church called Santiago Apóstol (Apostle James) as well as an ecological park called Kolem Jaá, one of the largest of its kind in Latin America. Nearby is the Cueva de Villa Luz, a cave that is a popular tourist destination. The town is also noted for a festival in honor of Chaac, the Maya god of rain.
