= Tacotalpa Municipality =

Municipality in the Mexican state of Tabasco

Coordinates: 17°36′N 92°49′W

Tacotalpa
- Municipality
- Location of the municipality in Tabasco.
- Country: Mexico
- State: Tabasco
- Capital: Tacotalpa

Government
  - Federal electoral district: Tabasco's 6th

Population (2020)
  - Total: 47,905
- Time zone: UTC-6 (Zona Centro)

Tacotalpa is a municipality in the Mexican state of Tabasco.

== Geography ==
=== Localities ===
- Tacotalpa (municipal seat)
- San Bernardo
- Tapijulapa

=== Climate ===
Climate data for Tacotalpa
Month	Jan	Feb	Mar	Apr	May	Jun	Jul	Aug	Sep	Oct	Nov	Dec	Year
Mean daily maximum °C (°F)	26.7 (80.1)	28.1 (82.6)	30.6 (87.1)	33.0 (91.4)	34.3 (93.7)	33.4 (92.1)	32.7 (90.9)	32.7 (90.9)	31.8 (89.2)	30.2 (86.4)	28.6 (83.5)	27.4 (81.3)	30.8 (87.4)
Mean daily minimum °C (°F)	17.4 (63.3)	17.9 (64.2)	19.5 (67.1)	21.4 (70.5)	22.5 (72.5)	22.5 (72.5)	21.9 (71.4)	21.8 (71.2)	21.9 (71.4)	20.9 (69.6)	19.4 (66.9)	18.1 (64.6)	20.4 (68.7)
Average precipitation mm (inches)	200 (7.9)	140 (5.7)	100 (4)	99 (3.9)	140 (5.7)	310 (12.4)	280 (11.2)	360 (14)	490 (19.1)	420 (16.5)	250 (9.7)	220 (8.6)	3,020 (118.8)
Source: Weatherbase
