= Cárdenas Municipality =

Municipality in the Mexican state of Tabasco

Coordinates: 17°59′N 93°22′W

Cárdenas
- Municipality
- Location of the municipality in Tabasco.
- Country: Mexico
- State: Tabasco
- Seat: Heroica Cárdenas

Government
  - Federal electoral district: Tabasco's 2nd

Population (2020)
  - Total: 243,229
- Time zone: UTC-6 (Zona Centro)

Cárdenas is a municipality in the Mexican state of Tabasco.

The municipality reported a population of 243,229 in the 2020 Census, down 2.11% from 2010.

The municipal seat is the city of Heroica Cárdenas.
