= Universidad Popular de la Chontalpa =

Public university located in the city of Cárdenas, Tabasco, Mexico

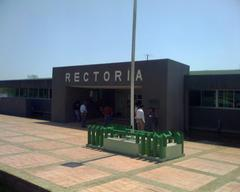
Popular University of Chontalpa
- Universidad Popular de la Chontalpa
- Motto: Universidad del pueblo y para el pueblo "University of the people and for the people"
- Type: Public
- Established: August 24, 1995
- President: Jose Victor Zarate Aguilera
- Undergraduates: 4,400 (2022)
- Location: Cárdenas, Tabasco, Mexico
- Website: www.upch.edu.mx

The Popular University of Chontalpa (in Spanish: Universidad Popular de la Chontalpa), popularly known as UPCh, is a public, coeducational university located in the city of Cárdenas, Tabasco, Mexico. It was founded on August 24, 1995, by the municipal government of Cardenas. On November 17, 1998, it was registered as a national institution of higher level education. By 2022, the university had 4,400 students, most of them living within the Cardenas municipality.
