= Sánchez Magallanes =

Town of Tabasco State, Mexico

Coordinates: 18°17′44.51″N 93°51′39.63″W

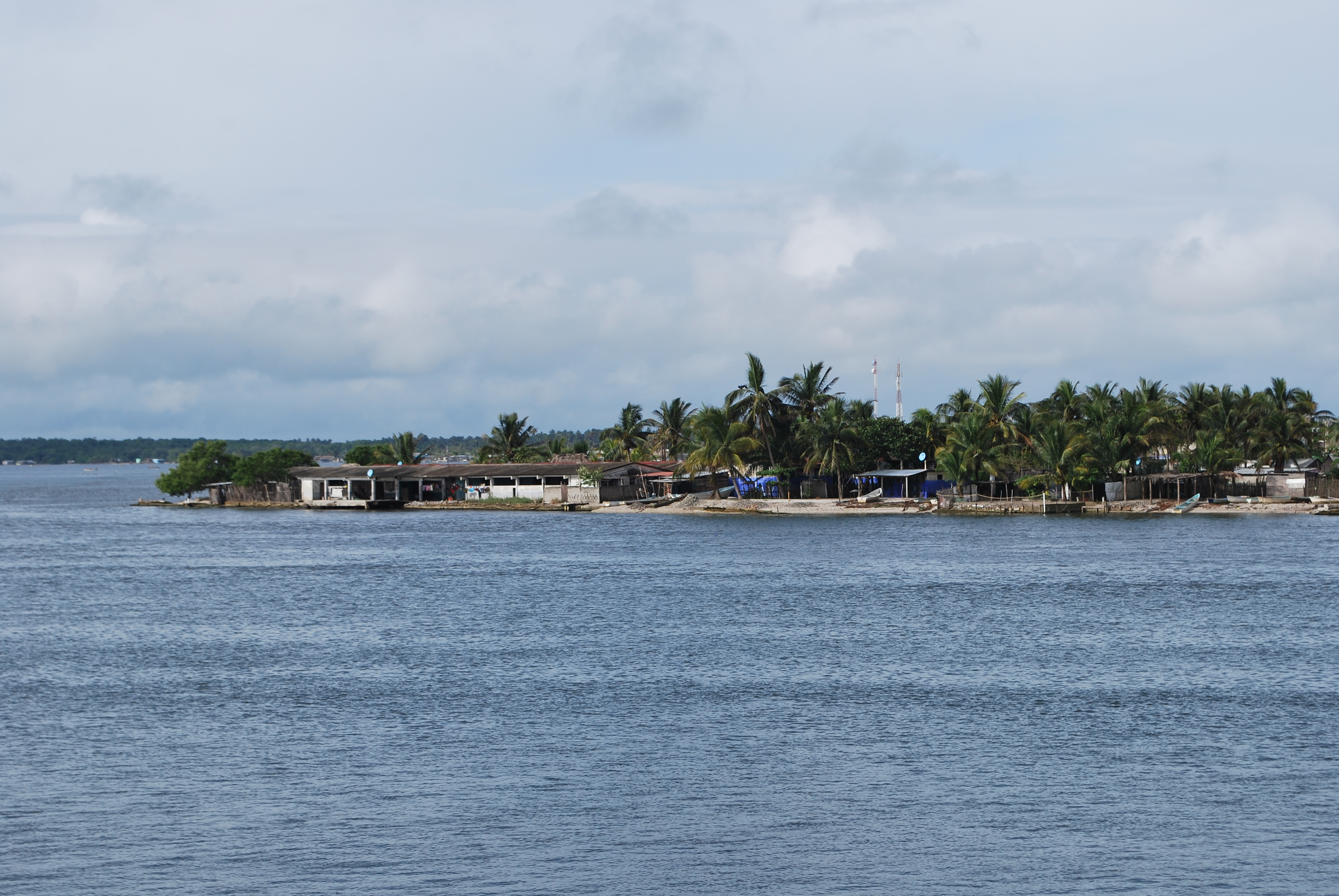
Looking toward the center of town from the main bridge.

Sánchez Magallanes is a small fishing town and port located in the far northwest of the state of Tabasco, Mexico in the municipality of Cárdenas. It is named after a leader in the French Intervention in Mexico, Coronel Andrés Sánchez Magallanes. The town is located on small peninsula which is between the Gulf of Mexico and a lagoon called Del Carmen, which the port faces. Fishing is the main economic activity here, especially the production of oysters, although there is tourism and oil production as well. The last has been problematic for fishing and tourism due to pollution. The most serious environmental problem is the erosion of the area's fragile beaches, especially the thin strips of land between the Gulf and the lagoons.

== The town ==
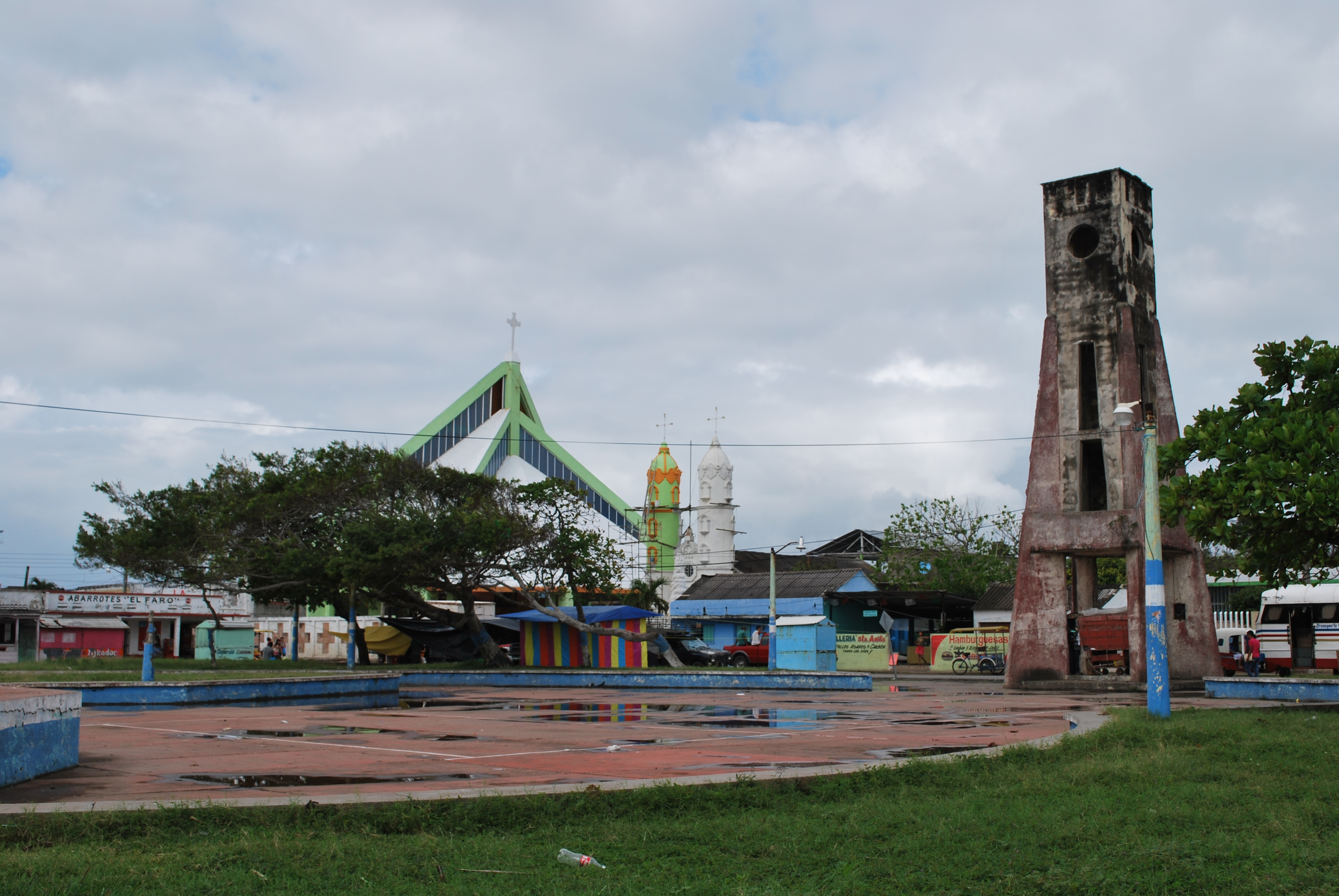
View of main plaza in center of town

Located in the far northwest of the municipality of Cárdenas 93 km from the municipal seat, the full name of the town is Coronel Andrés Sánchez Magallanes. It has an altitude of ten meters above sea level. The town is one of the municipality's 25 "regional centers of social and economic development."

Sánchez Magallanes has 7,827 people. The average schooling is only four years, with only 992 over the age of 15 with education beyond middle school. There are 441 people who are illiterate. There are 1,777 residences in the community, almost all of which are independent houses. Two hundred have packed earth floors and 456 consist of only one room.

The parish is named after Saint Anne, the grandmother of Jesus and established in 1959 by the Diocese of Tabasco. The patron saint is honored from the 24th to 26 July with religious activities as well as sporting and cultural events, a beauty pageant and exhibition of regional products. An Oyster Fair is held in conjunction with the other festivities. The town has a Virgin Mary statue called "Madre Patria" (Mother of Country) because at her feet is a serpent being devoured, similar to that of the national seal. It was chosen to receive a thirteen-meter sculpture of the Virgin Mary donated by the town of Benito Juárez. The sculpture is made of black volcanic stone and part of a series of seven Virgin Mary statues that define the “Chinandega Route” from Tenosique to Sánchez Magallanes.

According to scattered archeological evidence, the area was occupied at least as far back as the Mayan era. According to Bernal Díaz del Castillo, Juan de Grijalva, and Hernán Cortés passed an indigenous settlement here, then called Ayagualulco or Agualulco. Sometime after Spanish domination, the town became known as Barra de Santa Ana. According to oral tradition, there are two reasons why the Spanish community was called Barra de Santa Anna. The first states that during the 19th century, a devout woman from the city of Campeche donated a statue of Saint Anne to the community. The second states that a shipwrecked man on the point of drowning here pleaded to the saint to save him and by miracle he survived. He then donated an image of Saint Anne to the fishermen who saved him. The current name was declared in 1909 by state Governor Abraham Bandala in honor of Coronel Andrés Sánchez Magallanes, who fought against the French in the 19th century. The community was declared a town and port in 1964 by Governor Carlos Alberto Madrazo Becerra.

== Geography and environment ==
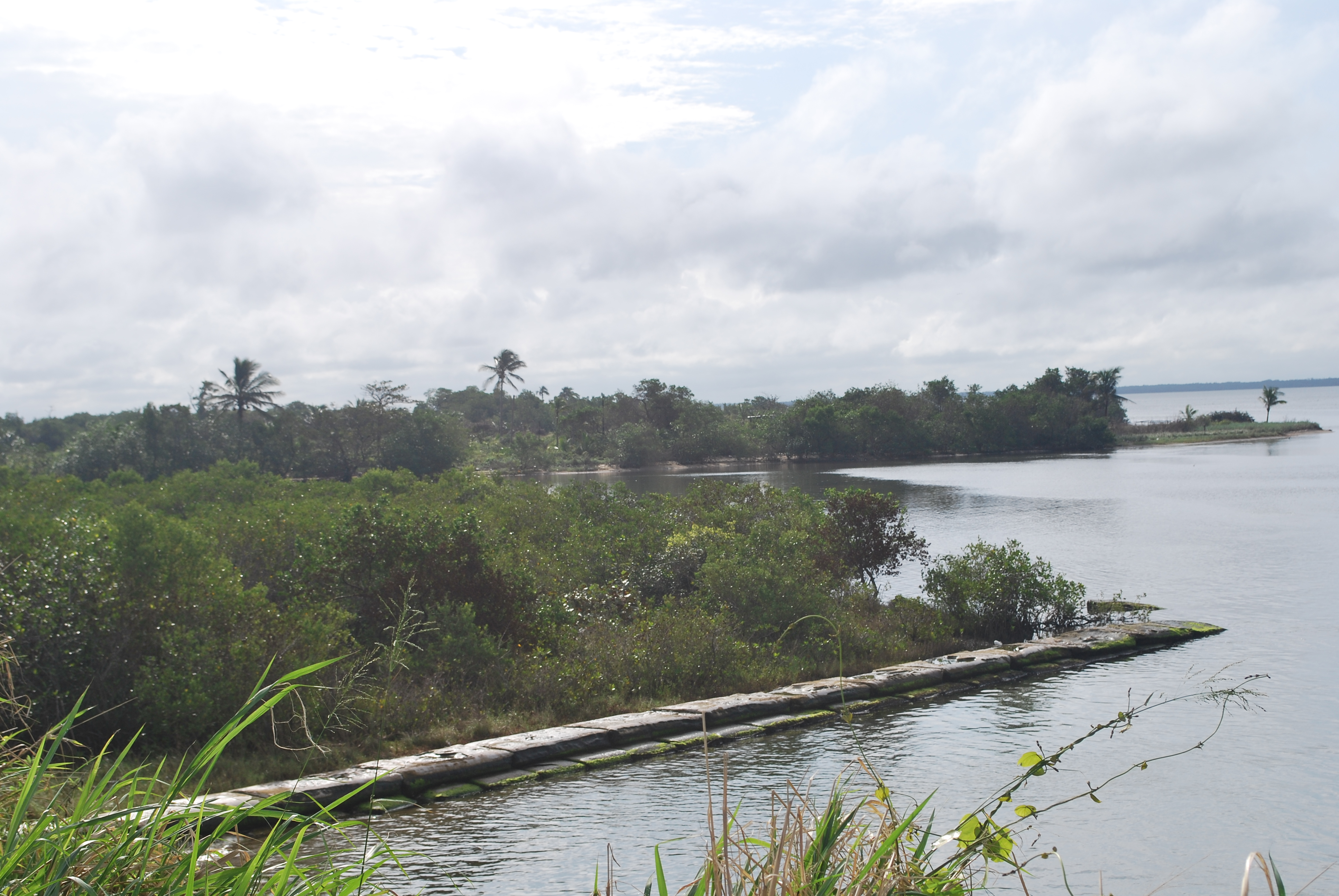
Vegetation on Gulf side of peninsula

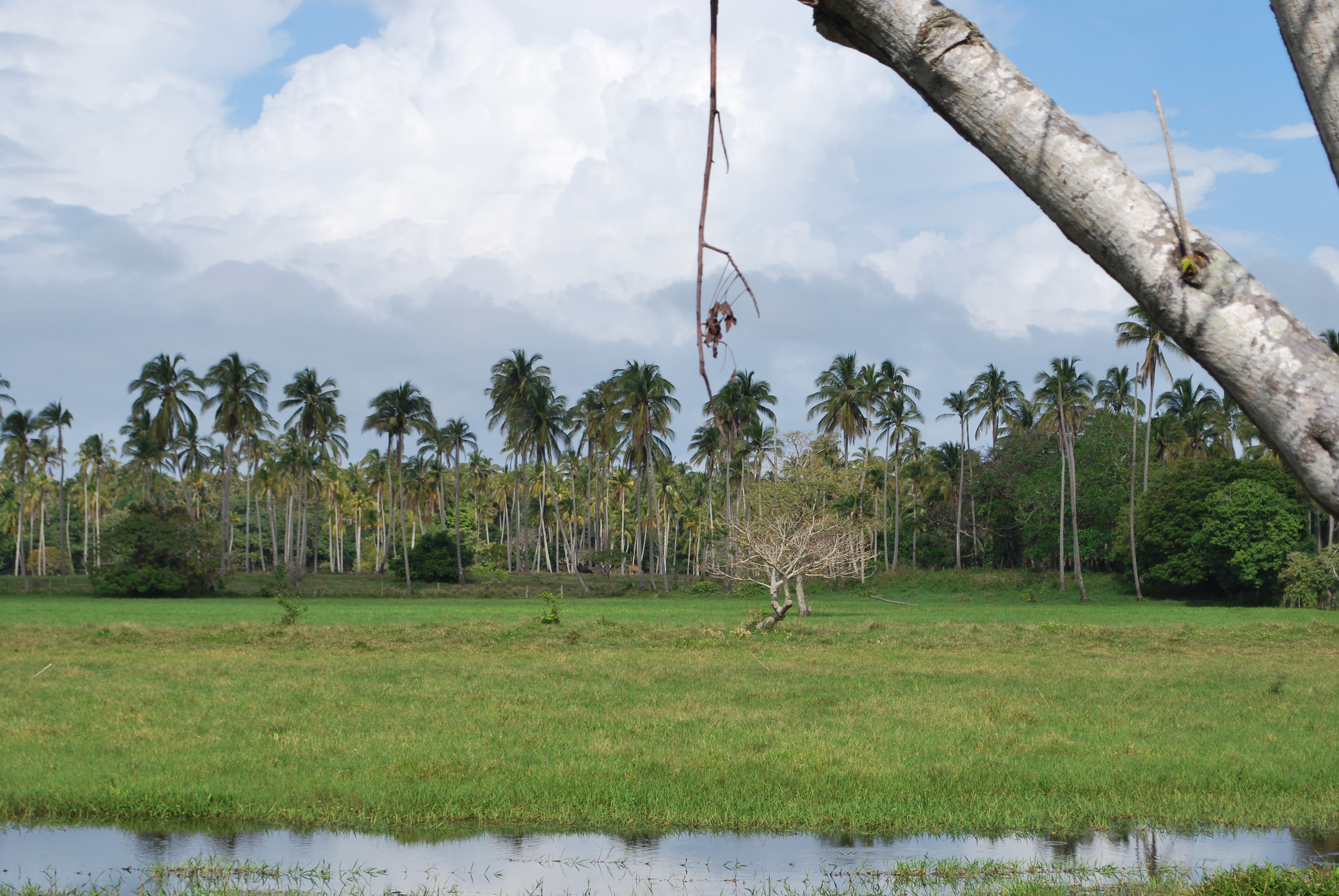
Wetlands just outside town

Sánchez Magallanes is located on a small peninsula which has the Gulf of Mexico on its north side and the Del Carmen Lagoon to its south. This strip of land is still called the Barra de Santa Anna. On the west it is attached to the mainland through a swampy area. The peninsula comes to a point on the east. The main road through the town comes to this point, which then connects to a bridge over a gap that connects the lagoon to the Gulf. The Del Carmen Lagoon is the inland body of water to which the center of town faces. It is one of several small lagoons which are separated only by narrow strips of land from the Gulf of Mexico. This water has tones of blue and green. Boats are available to rent for tours of the body of water or to visit nearby beaches. Rod and reel fishing is permitted. El Pajaral is a small island located near the town, which is a natural refuge for thousands of birds. It is about twenty minutes by boat to reach.

Like the rest of Tabasco, the town has a most hot and very wet climate. The area's climate is heavily affected by cold fronts from the north in the winter, which push temperatures down, bringing rain and wind that can be strong. Wind speeds have reached 100 km per hour. In the 1990s, various studies warned that the Tabasco coastline was fragile and vulnerable to erosion by storms. However, neither the federal or state governments have taken action to build sea walls or take other preventative measures. The Sánchez Magallanes area is the most vulnerable because of the lagoons separated from the Gulf by only meters wide strips of land. Damage to these lagoons cause economic hardships to both fishing and agriculture.

A study in 1998 by the Universidad Juárez Autónoma de Tabasco stated that economic activities such as farming and grazing, construction and lack of planning had produced grave environmental damage in the coastal areas of Sánchez Magallanes. These activities has caused much of the native coastal vegetation to disappear. Construction of the coastal highway in the 1970s provoked the disappearance of dunes, allowing waves to come further onshore during storms. This with increased winter storm activity, blamed on the "El Niño" phenomenon and global climate change have caused severe damage in the area with kilometers of beach washed away and farmland and lagoon areas damaged by sea water. Waves during storms now can reach the inland lagoons and causing higher salinity in the ground and water, killing plant and animal species. The manatee and pejelagarto fish have disappeared and oyster production has diminished. There are houses and other structures only meters from the Gulf waterline, which are susceptible to wind and erosion damage, often with only sandbags as buffers. About twenty km of the 92 km highway connecting the town with Paraiso have been destroyed or heavily damaged by erosion. In 2010, the area's beaches were closed by the state Secretary of Tourism before the Holy Week vacation period because of severe erosion. During the 2009/2010 winter storm season, there was severe damage to the beaches, mangroves and residential areas from here to Paraíso. This included flooding of the Del Carmen-Pajonal-Machona lagoon system, which damaged 104 houses and eroded three km of beaches. In 2010, the state employed foreign experts, principally from the Netherlands to study the erosion problem.

== Economy ==
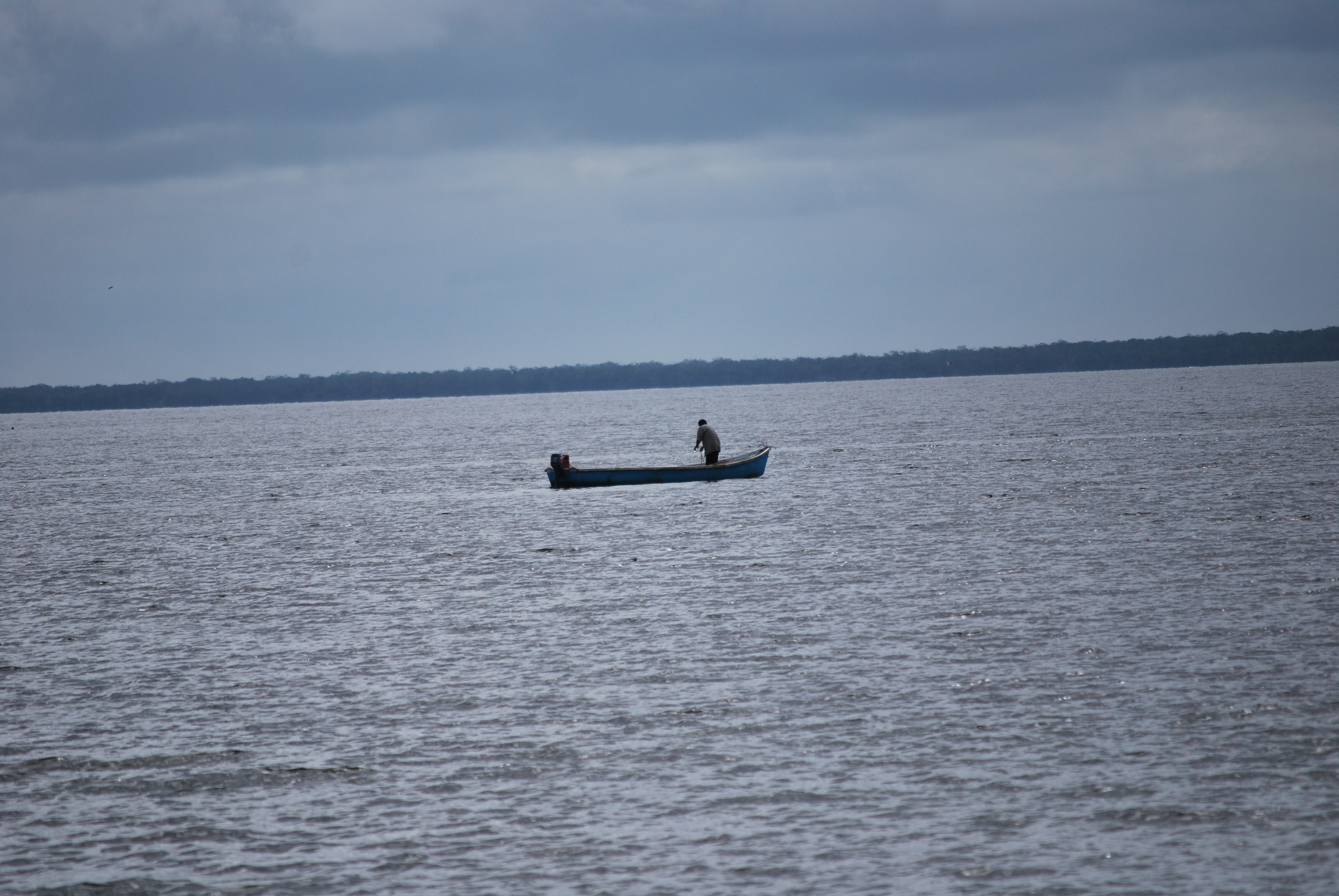
Fisherman in Del Carmen lagoon, just off main docks of town

The local economy is heavily dependent on fishing even though there is some, farming, livestock, tourism and petroleum production. Fishing in the area includes sea bass, shark, crab and oysters some of which is exported to Japan. Oyster farming and collection is particularly important, providing up to 75% of many families’ annual income. There are eleven cooperatives farming 10.5 hectares in the Del Carmen-Pajonal-Machona lagoon area. These cooperatives recently received 300,000 pesos to help with the rehabilitation of these farm areas as well as help with the promotion of the oysters produced. The program is slated to help 950 families which are dedicated to this activity. However, fishing in the area has had problems. Phenomena such as red tide can be devastating to fishing. Fishing in the area suffers from pollution from petroleum drilling, lack of equipment and seasons in which fishing is not permitted. The Sociedades Cooperativas Acuícolas del Golfo states that fishing yields have dropped from 500 tons per year to 300 since drilling began off the Tabasco coast and the pollution also damages boats and other equipment.

Mexico's oil company PEMEX began drilling in the wetlands areas around the peninsula in the 1960s, which has closed some areas such as the Chicozapote River and the El Yucateco lagoon to fishing because of pollution. Local residents complain that fish in the area can taste of oil and must fry it in order to get rid of the unwanted flavor. In 2005, PEMEX cleaned twelve tons of tar and other material contaminated by hydrocarbons from the beaches of Tabasco, including those of Sánchez Magallanes. Sánchez Magallanes is one of the beach areas regularly monitored for oil related pollution, especially before the vacation season of Holy Week.

It is an area that the municipality promotes for tourism because of its beaches, the Del Carmen Lagoon and the El Pajaral Island, on which live a wide variety of bird species. The beaches in and around the town receive about 8,000 visitors during the spring, when the weather is best, especially during the vacation period of Holy Week. One particularly popular beach is called Acapulquito (Little Acapulco) as access to the sea is free and easy. This beach is also the site of a music festival during the holidays. The Ensueño del Trópico Water Park is located on the Gulf coast on a beach which is four km long and sixty meters wide. It has fine, white sand and warm, blue waters with gentle waves. The water is shallow up to fifty meters away from shore.
