= Cárdenas, Tabasco =

City in the Mexican state of Tabasco

Coordinates: 17.983°N 93.367°W

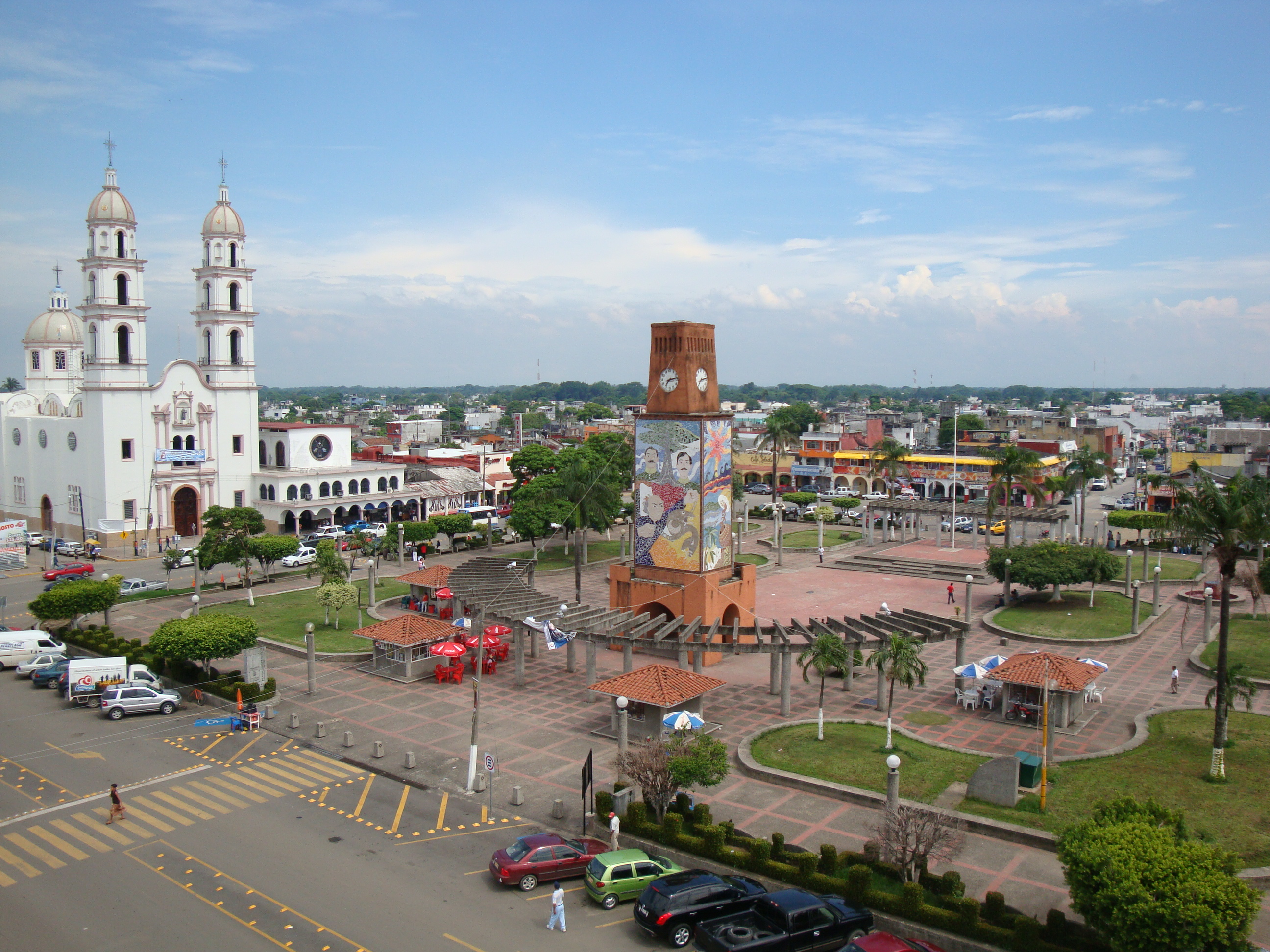
Panoramic view of the Independencia park in the city of Heroica Cárdenas, Tabasco state, Mexico.

Cárdenas is the second-largest city in the Mexican state of Tabasco, in southeastern Mexico. At the census of 2005 the city had a population of 79,875 inhabitants, while the municipality had 219,563 inhabitants. There are numerous smaller communities in the municipality, but the largest are Sánchez Magallanes and Campo Magallanes. The area of the municipality is 2,112 km² (815.45 sq mi).

== Geography ==
The city lies in the northwestern part of the state, on the Gulf of Mexico coast, east of the city of Coatzacoalcos, Veracruz. The city is the municipal seat of Cárdenas Municipality.

=== Climate ===
Climate data for Cardenas
Month	Jan	Feb	Mar	Apr	May	Jun	Jul	Aug	Sep	Oct	Nov	Dec	Year
Mean daily maximum °C (°F)	27.6 (81.7)	29 (84)	31.9 (89.4)	34.3 (93.7)	35.3 (95.5)	34.3 (93.7)	33.5 (92.3)	33.5 (92.3)	32.6 (90.7)	31.0 (87.8)	29.4 (84.9)	28.0 (82.4)	31.7 (89.1)
Mean daily minimum °C (°F)	18.2 (64.8)	18.5 (65.3)	19.9 (67.8)	21.7 (71.1)	23 (73)	23 (73)	22.5 (72.5)	22.5 (72.5)	22.4 (72.3)	21.7 (71.1)	20 (68)	18.8 (65.8)	21.0 (69.8)
Average precipitation mm (inches)	140 (5.4)	91 (3.6)	43 (1.7)	51 (2)	69 (2.7)	220 (8.6)	170 (6.8)	230 (9.1)	340 (13.3)	350 (13.8)	210 (8.4)	140 (5.4)	2,050 (80.8)
Source: Weatherbase

== Education ==
- Universidad Popular de la Chontalpa
