= Huimanguillo =

- Municipality
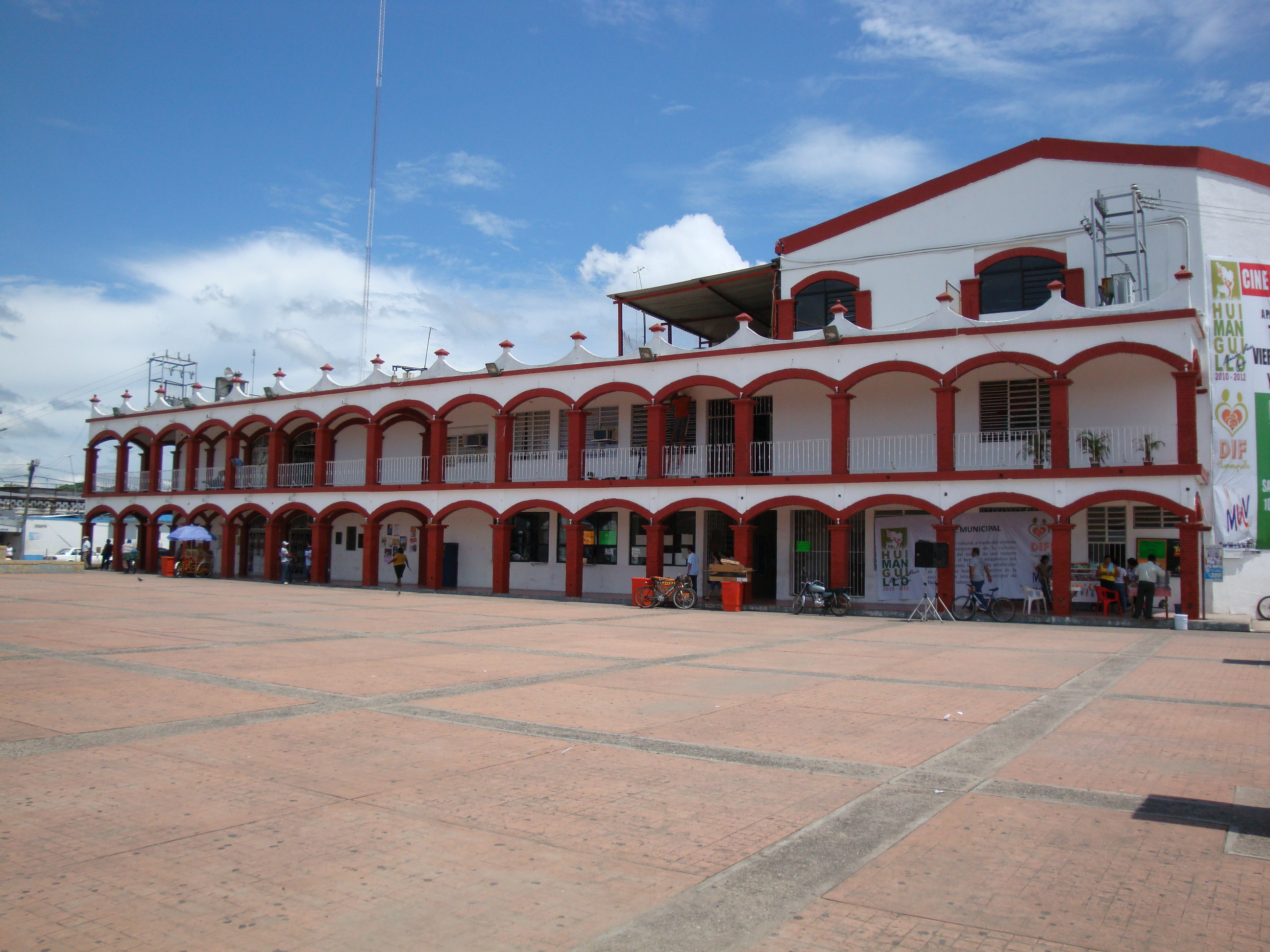
- Municipal Palace

- Location of the municipality in Tabasco.
- Coordinates: 17°49′55″N 93°23′31″W
- Country: Mexico
- State: Tabasco
- Seat: Huimanguillo

Government
  - Federal electoral district: Tabasco's 2nd

Population (2020)
  - Total: 190,885
- Time zone: UTC-6 (Zona Centro)

Huimanguillo is a municipality in the south-eastern Mexican state of Tabasco.

The city of Huimanguillo is the municipal seat and the largest city in Tabasco's Chontalpa region. It is located at a distance of 67 km from the city of Villahermosa, state capital.

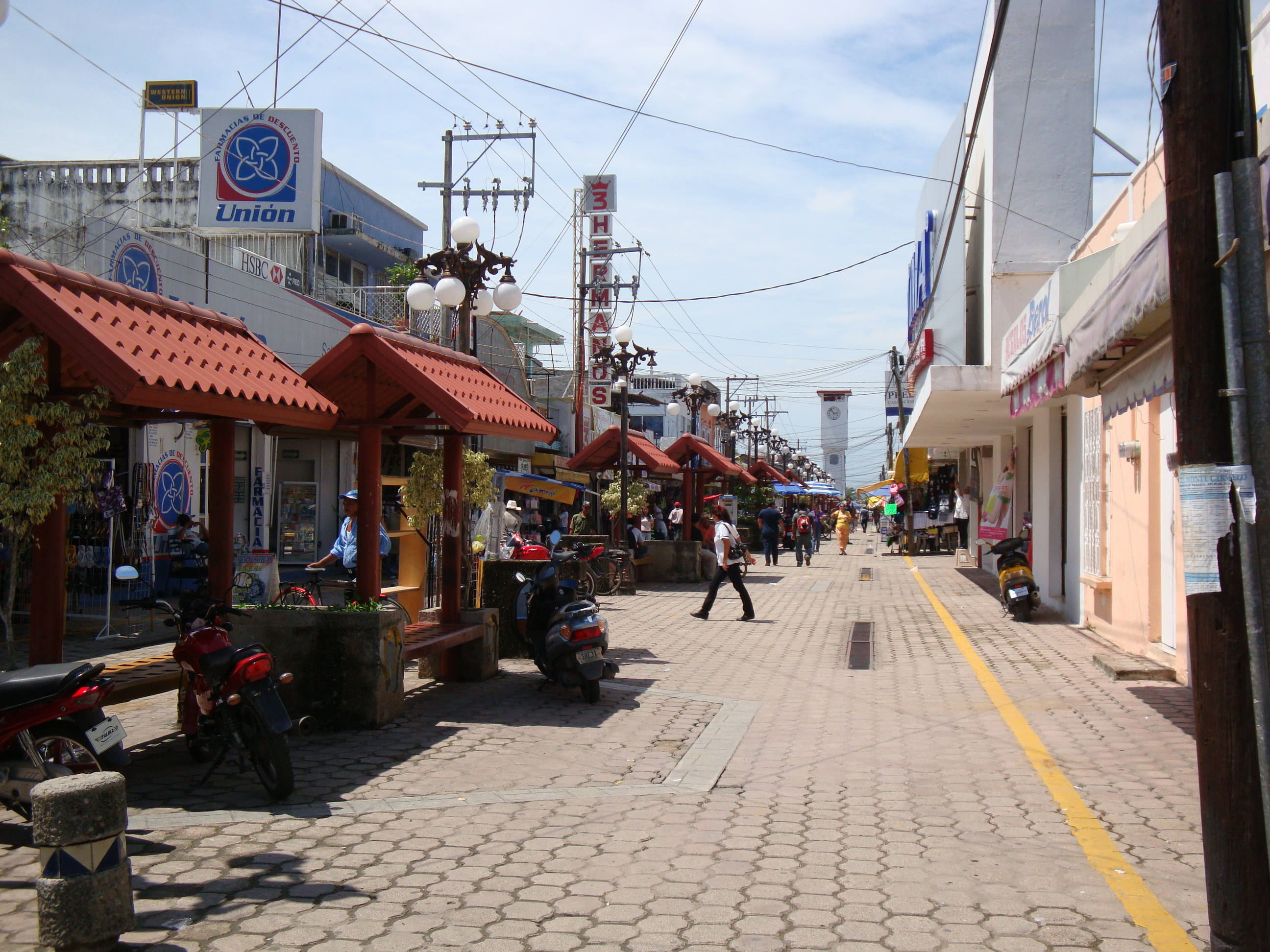
Street in the center of Huimanguillo.

== Geography ==
=== Climate ===
Climate data for Huimanguillo
Month	Jan	Feb	Mar	Apr	May	Jun	Jul	Aug	Sep	Oct	Nov	Dec	Year
Mean daily maximum °C (°F)	27.4 (81.3)	28.8 (83.8)	31.8 (89.2)	34.1 (93.4)	35.3 (95.5)	34.3 (93.7)	33.3 (91.9)	33.4 (92.1)	32.6 (90.7)	30.8 (87.4)	29.3 (84.7)	27.4 (81.3)	31.5 (88.7)
Mean daily minimum °C (°F)	17.5 (63.5)	18 (64)	20 (68)	21.9 (71.4)	22.7 (72.9)	23.0 (73.4)	22.6 (72.7)	22.7 (72.9)	22.6 (72.7)	21.6 (70.9)	19.8 (67.6)	18.1 (64.6)	20.9 (69.6)
Average precipitation mm (inches)	130 (5.1)	89 (3.5)	66 (2.6)	64 (2.5)	86 (3.4)	260 (10.1)	240 (9.5)	300 (11.8)	360 (14)	330 (13.1)	190 (7.4)	140 (5.6)	2,260 (88.8)
Source: Weatherbase
