= Tabasco (former state) =

Tavasco
- 12th century–1519
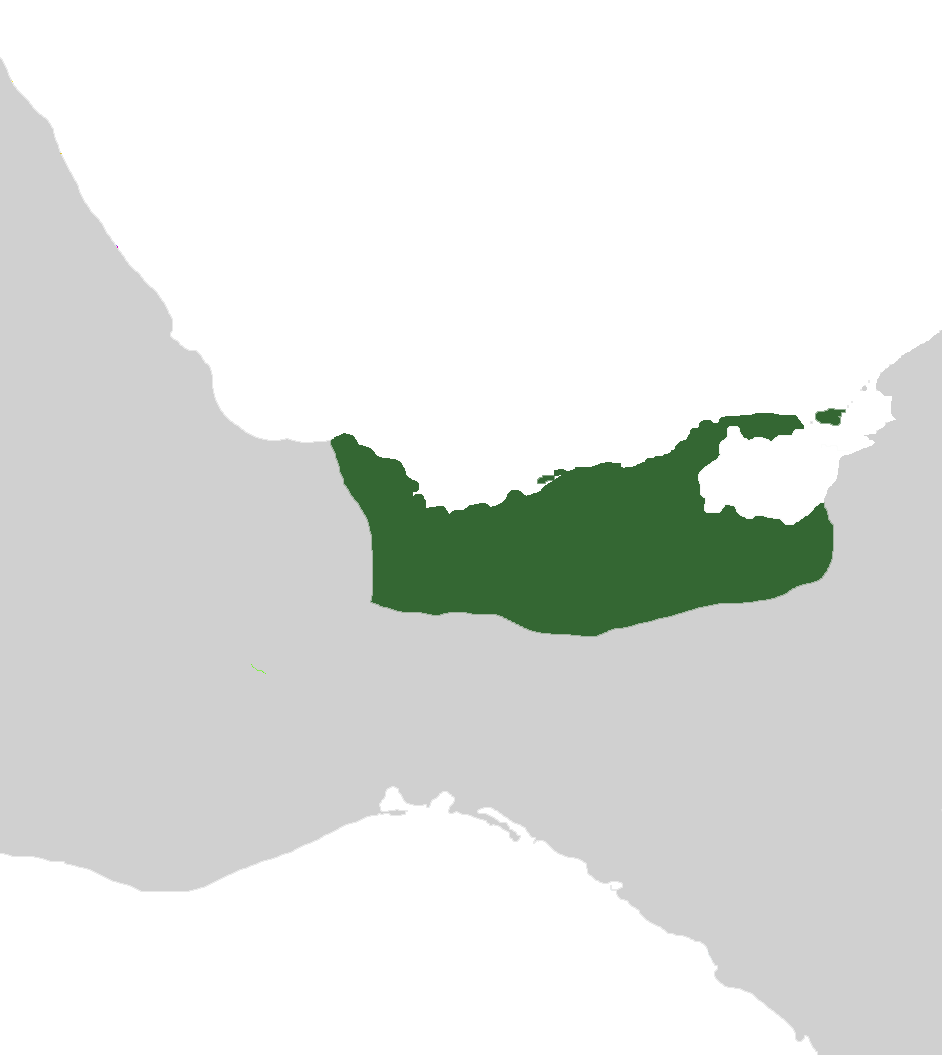
- Tabasco at its greatest extent, 1513-1519 (green).
- Capital: Potonchán
- Common languages: Yoko Ochoco
- Religion: Maya religion
- Government: monarchy
- Halach Uinik
  - 12th century: Unknown revolutionary
  - ?–1519: Tabscoob
- History
  - 11th century: 12th century
  - 1519: 16 April 1519
- Currency: Cacao bean and Jade
Preceded by	Succeeded by
League of Mayapan; Xicalango	New Spain
- Today part of: Mexico

Tabasco or Tavasco was a Chontal Maya polity in the westernmost area of the Maya region.

== History ==
=== Separation ===
Sometime, probably during the 12th century the Chontal Maya in the westernmost part of The League of Mayapan separated from the rest of the league. They did this because they objected to an alliance with Mayapan (the city, not the league). They adopted the same governmental system that existed when they were attached to the league and Mayapan, which included three existing classe: Nobility and priesthood, commoners and slaves.

It was in the west of their new country on the river Tabasco where they founded their capital city. Its name was Potonchán which means "smelly place." there were 25,000 homes there. Having their main city on a wide river near the ocean allowed them to have an extensive sea trade network.

=== Acalan ===
At some point the eastern part of Tabasco became independent. The new country's name was Acalan which had its capital at Itzamkanac. Acalan had constant disputes with Tabasco. Also Itzamkanac was inland and Acalan had a much smaller sea trade industry.

=== War with Xicalango ===
On Tris Island, now called Isla del Carmen, the people were not Maya but Nahua. They had their own country and port city, both called Xicalango. Tabasco claimed the island, and there was constant violence on the border. Finally in 1513 Tabscoob, the last ruler of Tabasco led an army of 20,000 soldiers to Xicalango, where they defeated the islanders. It was a Maya custom to give the Halach Uinik a large number of slaves from the destroyed country. One of the slaves from Xicalango was Malintzin.

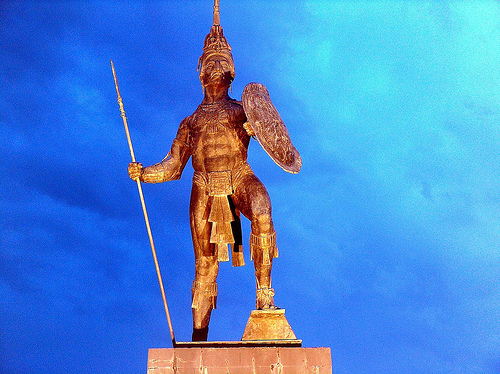
A Statue of Tabscoob

== European contact ==
=== The visit of Juan de Grijalva ===
The first Spanish expedition to land in Tabasco was led by Juan de Grijalva, who on June 8, 1518, traversed in what is now the state of Tabasco. Grijalva arrived that day at the mouth of a great river, which the crew named "Grijalva" in honor of their captain.

Juan de Grijalva went up the river to discover the inland area, and found four canoes full of Tabascans, painted and making gesticulations and gestures of war. But Grijalva sent the Mayas Julián and Melchorejo who were kidnapped from Ekab, so that they could explain to the Tabascans in the Chontal language that they came in peace. Thus they continued along the river and, after less than a league, stumbled upon the large city of Potonchán.

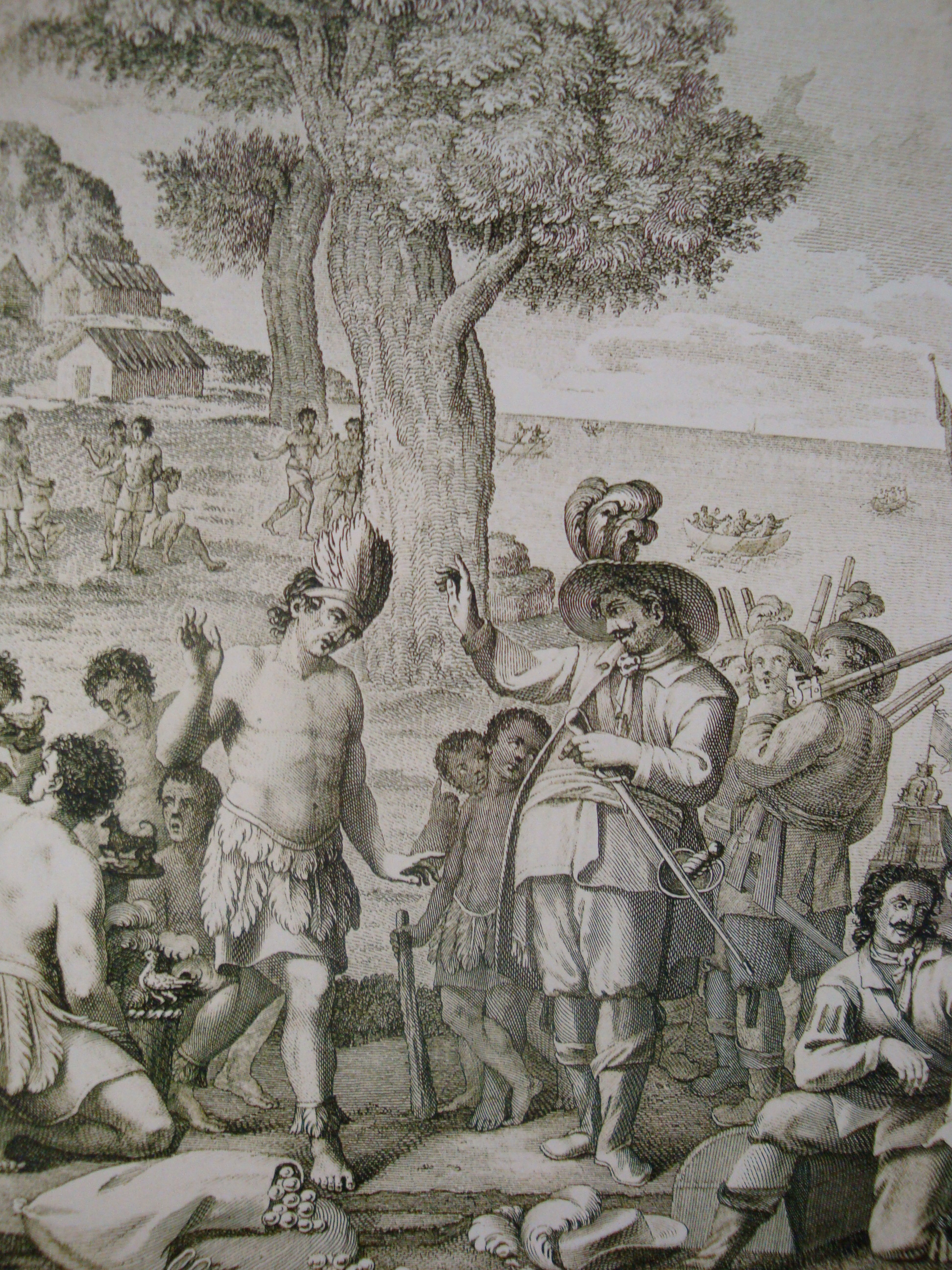
Grijalva and Tabscoob

We started eight days in June 1518 and going armed to the coast, about six miles away from land, we saw a very large stream of water coming out of a major river, the fresh water was spewing approximately six miles out to sea. And with that current we could not enter by said river, which we named the Grijalva River. We were being followed by more than two thousand Indians and they were making signs of war (...) This river flows from very high mountains, and this land seems to be the best upon which the sun shines; if it were to be more settled, it would serve well as a capital: it is called the Potonchán province.

—Juan Díaz, Itinerary of Grijalva (1518)

Once ashore, Juan de Grijalva, with the help of Maya interpreters that he had taken earlier, began to strike up a friendly dialog. In addition to flattering the natives with gifts, Grijalva begged them to call their boss to meet and hold talks with him. And so, after a while, the Halach Uinik Tabscoob appeared with his nobles to greet Grijalva. During the talk, both figures exchanged gifts. Tabscoob gave Grijalva, Tabscoob gold armor in the shape of a leaf and a feather headdress. Grijalva gave the Maya ruler his green velvet doublet.

== Hernán Cortés ==
=== First contact ===
On March 12, 1519, the Spanish conquistador Hernán Cortés arrived at the mouth of the Grijalva river. He decided to have his ships drop anchor and enter the river in skiffs, in search of the great city of Potonchán described by Juan de Grijalva.

Cortés landed right at the mouth of the river, at a place named "Punta de los Palmares."

On the twelfth day of the month of March of the year one-thousand five-hundred nineteen, we arrived with all the fleet at the Rio de Grijalva, which is also called Tabasco(...) and from the smaller vessels and boats all the soldiers were landed at the Cape of the Palms(as they were in Grijalva's time) which was about half a league distant from the town of Tabasco. The river, the river banks and the mangrove thickets were swarming with Indians (...) in addition to this there were assembled in the town more than twelve thousand warriors all prepared to make war on us...

—Bernal Díaz del Castillo, Historia Verdadera de la Conquista de la Nueva España (1519)

To discover their intentions, Cortés, used a translator, to tell some Tabascans that were in a boat that "he would do no harm, to those who came in peace and that he only wanted to speak with them." But Cortés, seeing that the natives were still threatening, ordered weapons brought on the boats and handed them to archers and musketeers, and he began planning how to attack the city.

=== The first battle ===
The next day Cortés sent Alonso de Ávila with one hundred soldiers out on the road leading to the City, while Cortés and the other group of soldiers went in the boats. There, on the shore, Cortés made a requisition for them disembark. The natives refused, telling the Spaniards that, if they disembarked, they would be killed. They began to shoot arrows at Cortés' soldiers, initiating combat.

... and they surrounded us with their canoes with such a spray of arrows that they made us stop with water up to our waists, and there was so much mud that we could not get out and many Indians charged us with spears and others pierced us with arrows, ensuring that we did not touch land as soon as we would have liked, and with so much mud we couldn't even move, and Cortés was fighting and he lost a shoe in the mud and came to land with one bare foot(...) and we were upon them on land crying to St. James and we made them retreat to a wall that was made of timber, until we breached it and came in to fight with them(...) we forced them through a road and there they turned to fight face-to-face and they fought very valiantly....

—Bernal Díaz del Castillo, Historia Verdadera de la Conquista de population la Nueva España (1519)

Alonso de Ávila arrived to the combat developing within Potonchán with his hundred men who went traveled by land, making the Tabascans flee and take refuge in the mountains. In this way, Cortés took possession of the great main plaza of Potonchán, in which there were rooms, great halls, and which had three houses of idols.

...we came upon a great courtyard, which had some chambers and great halls, and had three houses of idols. In the "cúes" [temples] of that court, which Cortés ordered that we would repair (...) and there Cortés took possession of the land, for his Majesty and in his royal name, in the following manner: His sword drawn, he dealt three stabs to a large ceiba tree in a sign of possession. The tree was in the square of that great town and he said that if there were one person that contradicted him, he would defend it with his sword and all those that were present said it was okay to take the land (...) And before a notary of the king that decree was made...

—Bernal Díaz del Castillo, Historia Verdadera de la Conquista de la Nueva España (1519)

=== Battle of Centla ===
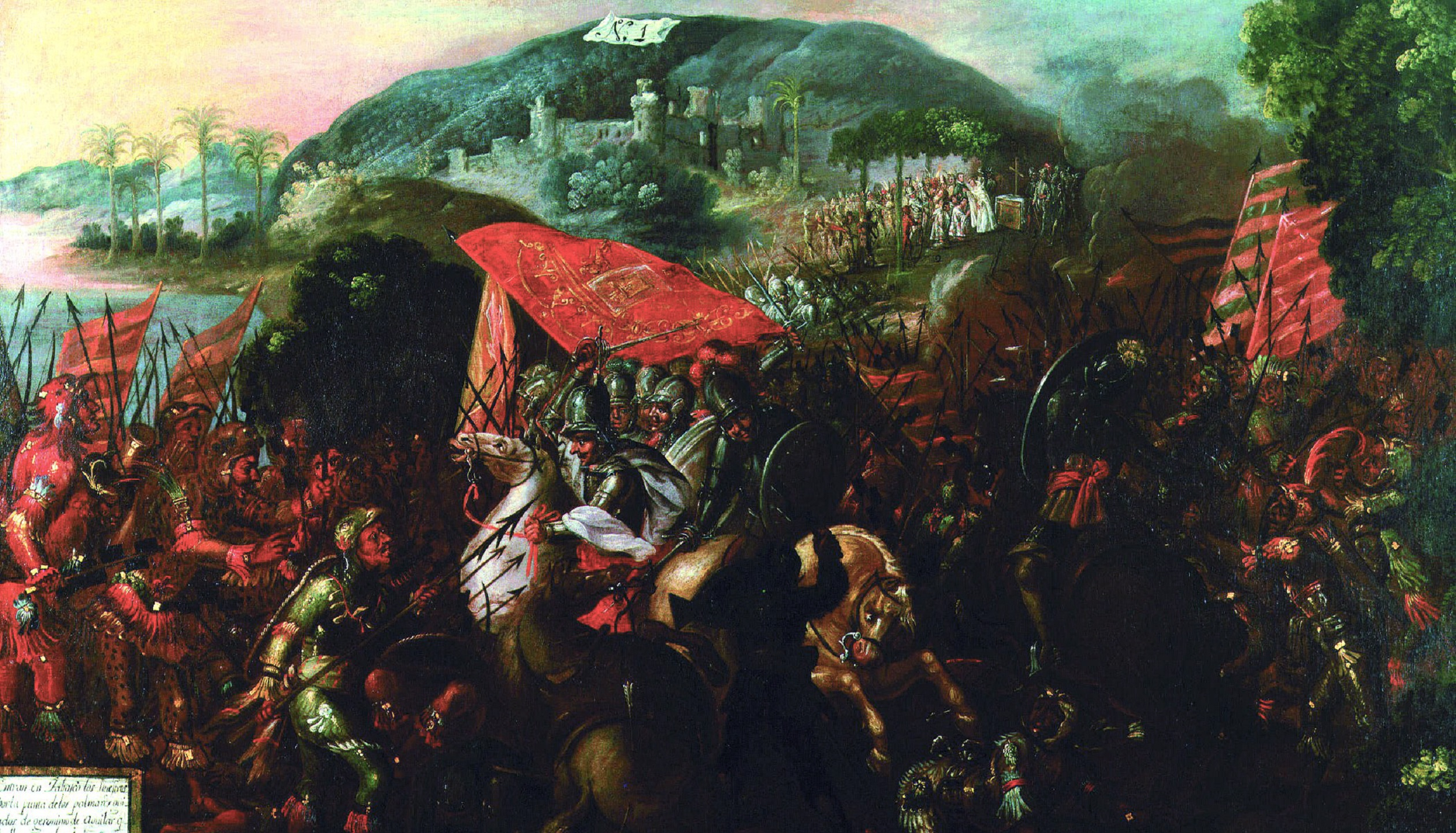
Hernan attacking Potonchan

The next day, Captain Cortés sent Pedro de Alvarado with a hundred soldiers so that he could go six miles inland, and he sent Francisco de Lugo, with another hundred soldiers, to a different part. Francisco de Lugo ran into warrior squads, starting a new battle. Upon hearing the shots and drums, Alvarado went in aid of Lugo, and together, after a long fight, they were able to make the natives flee. The Spaniards returned to town to inform Cortés. The next day, early in the morning, Cortés and his men went through plains to Cintla or Centla. There they found thousands of Tabascan soldiers, beginning Battle of Centla. The Spaniards were attacked by the Tabascans. The Spaniards defended themselves with firearms like muskets and cannons. But what scared them much more was seeing the Spaniards riding horses. There were no horses in the Americas before the Spaniards came. The Tabascans believed that both rider and horse were one. In the end the Tabascans lost.

== See also ==
- Potonchán
