= Chan people =

The Chan were an ancient Maya people in the Yucatan peninsula, originating from the Putun (or Chontal Maya) and the ancestors of the Itza. It is thought that in approximately 320 CE a group of Putun from the Tabasco region migrated into Petén, Guatemala. Later, led by Holón Chan, they migrated to the north, adopting the name Chan, arriving in the eastern part of the Yucatan, where they founded the city of Sian Ka'an Bakhalal around 435 CE.

After staying there more than 60 years, they decided to continue north, founding Chichen Itzá in 555 CE where they adopted the name Itza. Due to political and economic pressures they later abandoned the city and were displaced to the east. They founded other towns such as Izamal, T'Hó (now Mérida), and Chakán Putum, where they stayed until 928 CE.

== See also ==
- Chontal Maya
- Itza people
- League of Mayapan
