= Itza people =

Central American ethnic group

Itza
Itzaj

Total population
- 2,926 (36 native speakers)

Regions with significant populations
- El Petén

Languages
- Spanish, formerly Itzaʼ

Religion
- Christianity (Roman Catholic, Evangelical)

Related ethnic groups
- Putun, Chontal, Kowoj

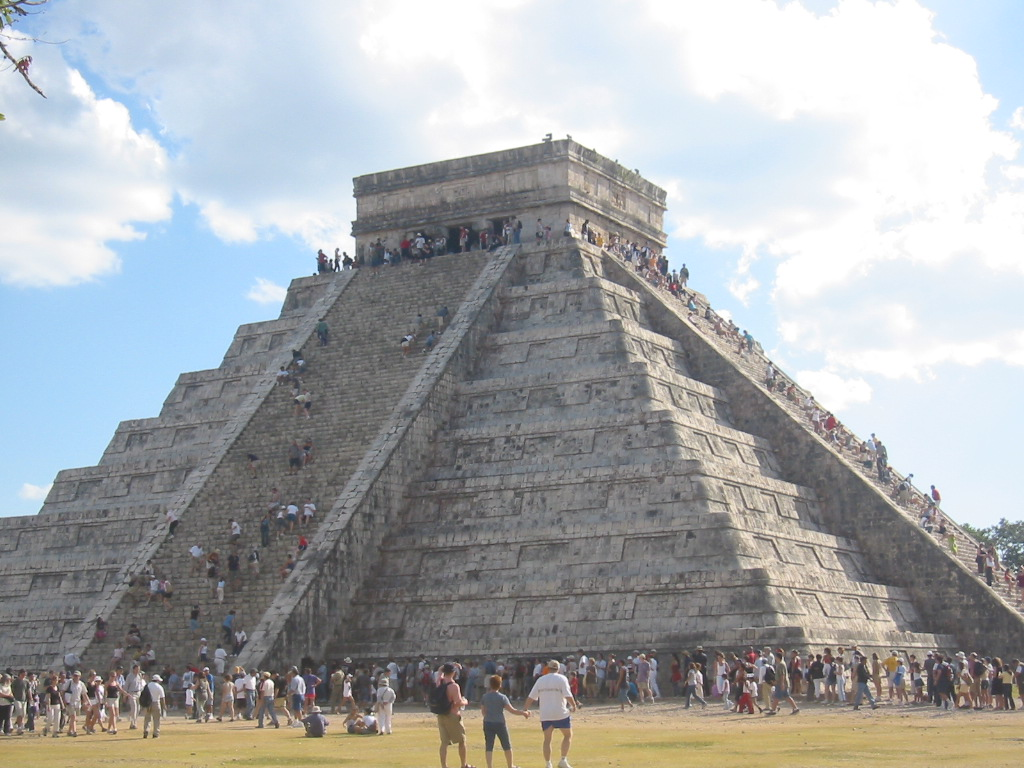
"El Castillo" at Chichen Itza

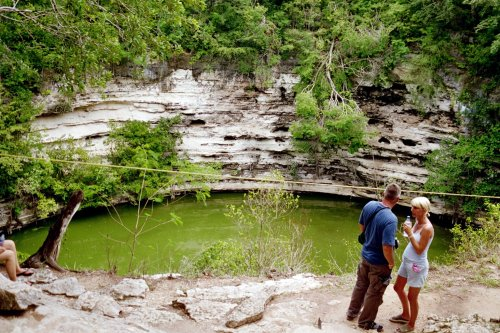
The sacred cenote that gave its name to Chichen Itza.

The Itza are a Maya ethnic group. They are descendants of the Chanes from the Chontal region of Tabasco. They migrated to Bacalar and northern Yucatán during the 10th century, later arriving to Champotón and finally in the 15th century settling around Lake Petén Itzá where they remained independent until 1697. During the Spanish colonial era and later by the Guatemalan government, the Itza were victims of repressive policies that accelerated the extinction of the Itza culture and language, leading to the loss of much of their ethnic identity.

They are one of the smallest Maya groups and have the lowest population; the few Itza descendants are settled in the town of San José, north of Lake Petén Itzá in the department of Petén, Guatemala, and are considered highly acculturated to mestizo society, with only 36 elderly people remaining as native speakers of the language.

== Numbers of ethnic group members and Itza speakers ==
According to the census of 2002, there are 1,983 ethnic Itza, who retain some aspects of their indigenous culture. However, the Itza language is now almost extinct. Data taken from the Summer Institute of Linguistics (SIL) suggest there were only twelve fluent Itza speakers left in 1986 and 60 non-fluent speakers in 1991. According to a census of 2002, there were still 1094 speakers. However the number of speakers has decreased to only 36 native and fluent speakers, all of them elder people. The Mayan word itza means 'enchanted waters' and may have been adopted from the name of the lake itself.

== In Yucatán ==
The Itza were descended from the Ah Itzá Yucatecan Maya lineage; historically they were an important Mesoamerican people who dominated the Yucatán peninsula in the Post-classic period. The Itza may have originated from the Classic Period city of Motul de San José near lake Peten Itza in Guatemala, migrating to Yucatán during the Maya collapse at the end of the Classic Period. From their capital at Chichén Itzá, Mexico they established a trade empire reaching as far south as Naco in Honduras. Chichen Itza means 'at the mouth of the well of the Itza' in the Itza language.

The books of Chilam Balam recount the history of the Itza and the demise of their empire at the hands of a band of Mexicanized Putún Maya led by the mercenary king Hunac Ceel, founder of the Cocom dynasty of Mayapan. Hunac Ceel fought the Itzas but was taken captive and was to be sacrificed by being thrown into the cenote of Chichén Itzá. However, he survived the attempted sacrifice, and having spent a night in the water he was able to relate a prophecy of the rain god Chac about the year's coming harvest. Once lord of Mayapan, he orchestrated, aided by sorcery, the destruction of Chichén Itzá.

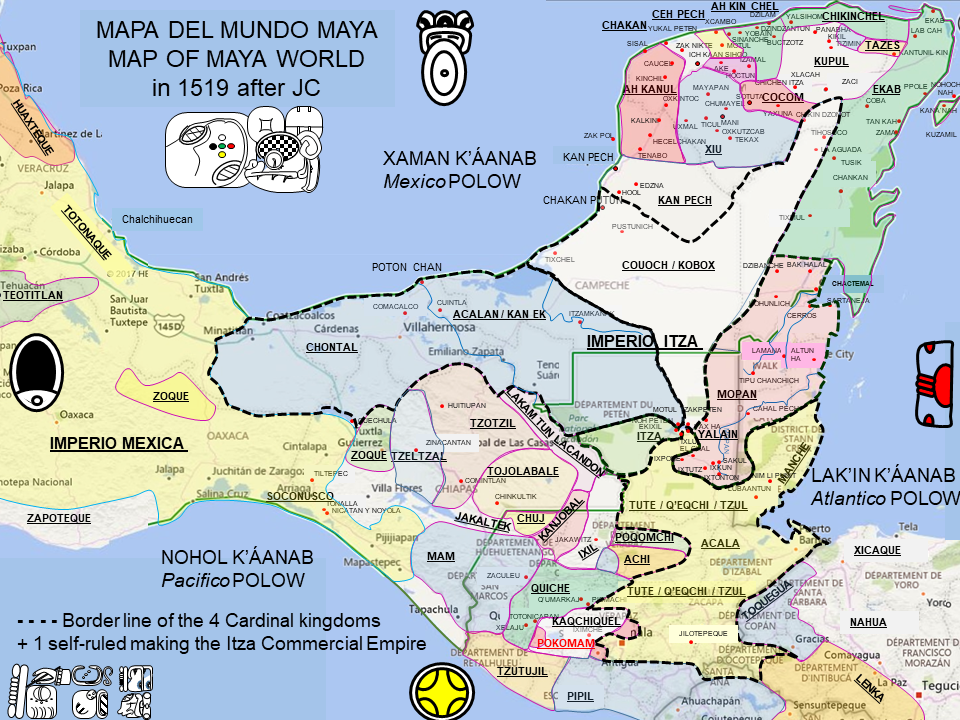
Map of maximal extend of Maya Itza empire in 1519 with borders – - – - of the 4+1 cardinal kingdoms and all other external Maya kingdoms.

While part of the story of Hunac Ceel seem to be more mythical than historical, it is generally accepted that the Itza of Chichén Itzá were the eventual losers in a power struggle between the three Yucatecan lineages of the Cocom, the Xiu and the Itzá, all claiming heritage from the Toltecs. And around 1331 archeological remains attest that Chichén Itzá and other Itza dominated sites, for example Isla Cerritos, were abandoned. The fall of these sites was contemporary with a gradual incursion of Mexicanized Putún Maya from Tabasco and central Mexico, and it seems that these were indeed the people who caused the fall of the original Itza state.

== In Petén ==
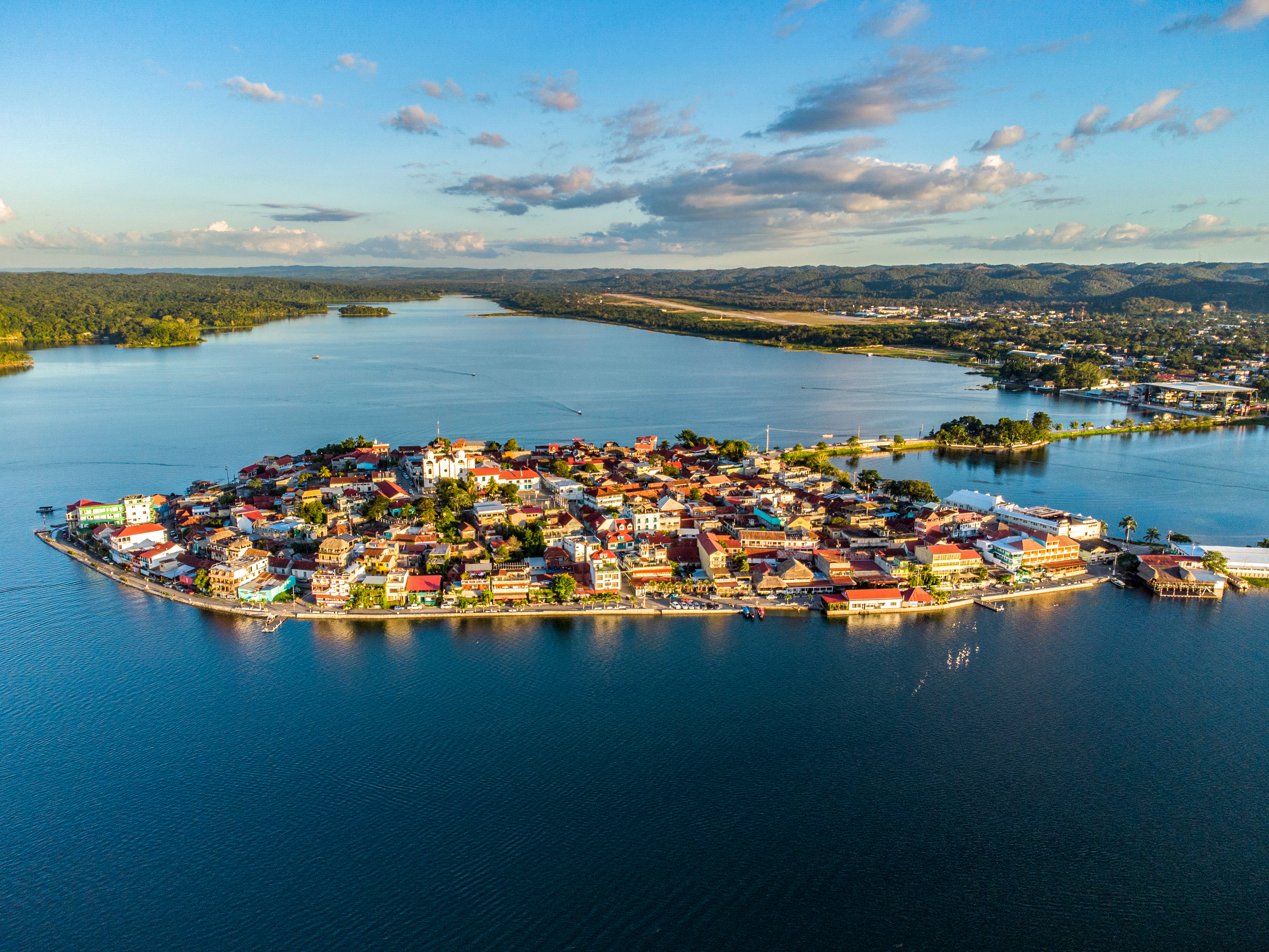
Aerial view of Flores, Guatemala, built on the ruins of the Itza capital Nojpetén

The Itza then left or were expelled from the Yucatán region and returned south to the Petén Basin region to build the city Nojpetén as their capital. Noj peten means "great island" in Itza'. The early Spanish accounts referred to it as Tayasal, derived from the Nahuatl tah itza ("place of the Itzá").

The Itza' were at the height of their territorial expansion when Cortes arrived on the coastal cities of Chakán Putum and Potonchán in 1519. The Itza' empire covered 230,000 square kilometers, organised into 4 main kingdoms, all of which were subordinate to the Itza':

- Northern (Cobox)
- Western (Chontal)
- Eastern (Mopan and Yalain)
- Southern (Q'eqchi')

The Nahua princess Malintzin (La Malinche / Doña Marina) and 6 other women were given to Cortes at the end of the Battle of Cuintla as a peace act by the Kan Ek' Paxbolon Nachan.

In 1523, after the fall of the Aztecs, Hernán Cortés led an expedition to what is now Honduras. While in the territory of the Itza' Empire, he executed the last Aztec emperor, Cuauhtémoc, for conspiring to kill him. He later visited Nojpetén with an army of Spaniards and 600 Chontal Maya on his way to Honduras in 1523 and he celebrated mass with the Kan Ek' of the Itza'.

The Itza' were the last Maya kingdom to remain independent of the Spanish, and some Spanish priests peacefully visited and preached to the last Itza king as late as 1696. On March 13, 1697, the Itza kingdom finally submitted to Spanish rule, represented by a force led by Martín de Ursua, governor of Yucatán. The northern lowland Petén region includes families that can be traced back to pre-colonial Itza. Although the Itza language is near extinction, Itza agro-forestry practices, including use of dietary and medicinal plants, may still tell much about how pre-colonial Itza managed the Maya lowlands.

In the 1930s, the use and teaching of the Itza language as well as the traditional clothing was banned in the department of Petén as part of the repressive policies of the Guatemalan government led by President Jorge Ubico Castañeda for the cultural assimilation of indigenous people to the Guatemalan Ladino culture, causing the loss of the language, ethnic and other cultural elements in subsequent generations.

== See also ==
- Chichen Itza
- Itza language
- Kukulkan
- Morzillo
