= Horse worship =

Spiritual practice

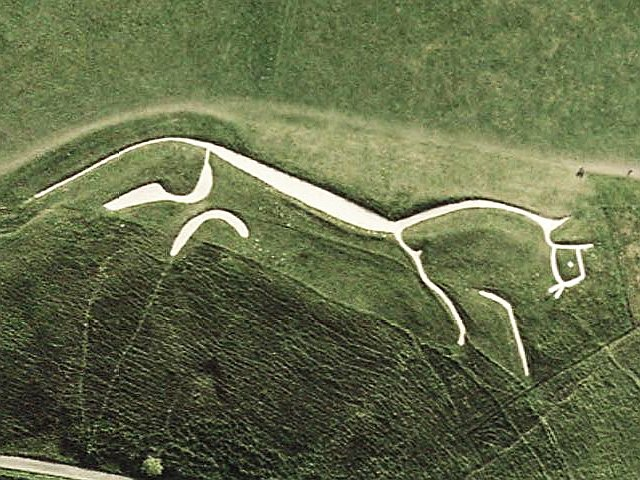
The Uffington White Horse

Horse worship is a spiritual practice with archaeological evidence of its existence during the Iron Age and, in some places, as far back as the Bronze Age. The horse was seen as divine, as a sacred animal associated with a particular deity, or as a totem animal impersonating the king or warrior. Horse cults and horse sacrifice were originally a feature of Eurasian nomad cultures. While horse worship has been almost exclusively associated with Indo-European culture, by the Early Middle Ages it was also adopted by Turkic peoples.

Horse worship still exists today in various regions of South Asia.

== Bronze Age ==
The history of horse domestication is still a debated topic. The most widely accepted theory is that the horse was domesticated somewhere in the western Eurasian steppes. Various archaeological cultures including the Botai in Kazakhstan and Dereivka in Ukraine are proposed as possible candidates. However, widespread use of horses on the steppes is only noted from the late part of the third millennium BCE.

The world's oldest horse burial and signs of horse worship (such as horse figurines among grave goods) were discovered at the Syezzheye cemetery of Samara culture in the Bogatovsky District. The cemetery is dated to the 1st half of the 4th millennium BC.

== Iron Age ==
The Uffington White Horse in the United Kingdom, is dated to the Iron Age (800 BC–100 AD) or the late Bronze Age (1000–700 BC) in Britain; deposits of fine silt removed from the horse's 'beak' were scientifically dated to the late Bronze Age.

The French archaeologist Patrice Méniel has demonstrated, based on examination of animal bones from many archaeological sites, a lack of hippophagy (horse eating) in ritual centres and burial sites in Gaul, although there is some evidence for hippophagy from earlier settlement sites in the same region.

Horse oracles are also attested in later times (see Arkona below).

There is some reason to believe that Poseidon, like other water gods, was originally conceived under the form of a horse. In Greek art, Poseidon rides a chariot that was pulled by a hippocampus or by horses that could ride on the sea, and sailors sometimes drowned horses as a sacrifice to Poseidon to ensure a safe voyage.

In the cave of Phigalia Demeter was, according to popular tradition, represented with the head and mane of a horse, possibly a relic of the time when a non-specialized corn-spirit bore this form. Her priests were called Poloi (Greek for "colts") in Laconia.

This seems related to the archaic myth by which Poseidon once pursued Demeter; She spurned his advances, turning herself into a mare so that she could hide in a herd of horses; he saw through the deception and became a stallion and captured her. Their child was a horse, Arion, which was capable of human speech.

This bears some resemblance to the Norse mythology reference to the gender-changing Loki having turned himself into a mare and given birth to Sleipnir, "the greatest of all horses".

== Germanic ==
Tacitus (Germania) mentions the use of white horses for divination by the Germanic tribes:

But to this nation it is peculiar, to learn presages and admonitions divine from horses also. These are nourished by the State in the same sacred woods and groves, all milk-white and employed in no earthly labour. These yoked in the holy chariot, are accompanied by the Priest and the King, or the Chief of the Community, who both carefully observed his actions and neighing. Nor in any sort of augury is more faith and assurance reposed, not by the populace only, but even by the nobles, even by the Priests. These account themselves the ministers of the Gods, and the horses privy to his will.

== Gallo-Roman ==
In Gallo-Roman times, the worship of Epona was widespread in the north-western portions of the Roman Empire.

== Early medieval ==
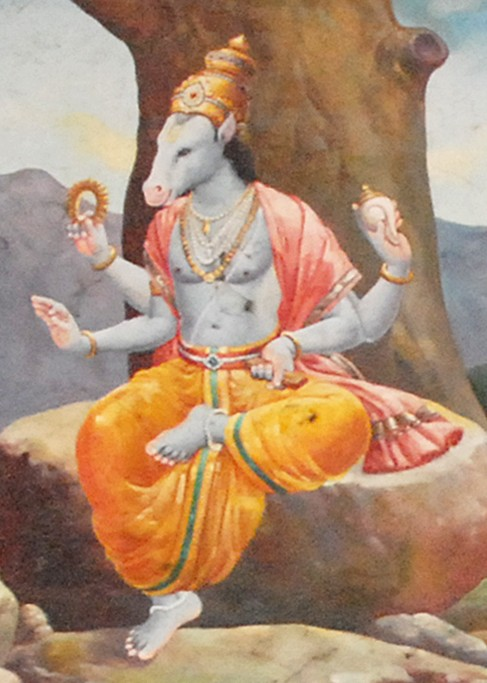
Hayagriva, the Hindu god

The Welsh legend of Rhiannon and the Irish legend of Macha, although first recorded in Christian times, may indicate memories of horse worship. The white horse of Rhiannon is another example of cultic use of white horses, which seems to be an Indo-European phenomenon.

The temple fortress of Arkona, at Cape Arkona on the German island of Rügen, was the religious centre of the Slavic Rani in the Early Middle Ages. The temple, dedicated to the deity Svantevit, housed an important horse oracle in Slavic times, where the behaviour of a white stallion could decide peace or war – recalling the above account by Tacitus.

Similar horse oracles have been reported from medieval temples in Pomeranian Stettin and Lutitian Rethra and in temples in the Ming Dynasty Tombs.

== India ==
In India, horse worship in the form of worship of Hayagriva dates back to 2000 BC, when the Indo-Aryan people started to migrate into the Indus valley. The Indo-Aryans worshipped the horse for its speed, strength, and intelligence. To this day, the worship of Hayagriva exists among the followers of Hinduism.

== See also ==
- Epona
- White horse (mythology)
- Horse symbolism
- Horse burial
- Animal worship
- Domestication of the horse
- Horse (zodiac)
- Morzillo
