= Morzillo =

Deified horse from Mexico

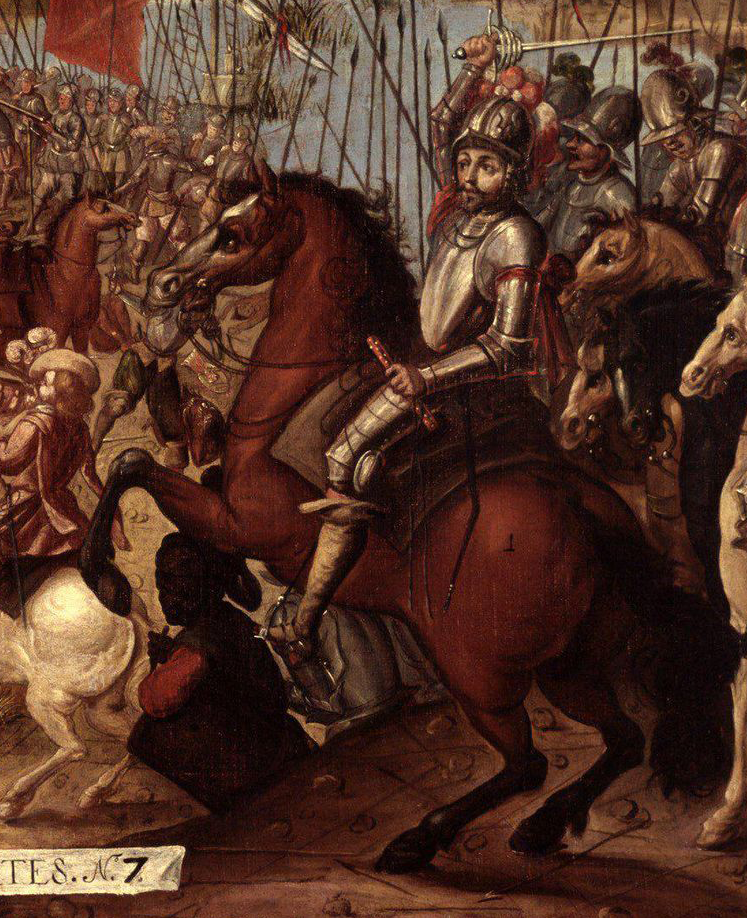
- Conquest of Mexico by Cortés, detail of Cortés and Morzillo (second half of the 17th century).
- Breed: Horse
- Born: Jamaica
- Died: 1525
- Owner: Hernán Cortés

Morzillo was a black horse owned by the Spanish conquistador Hernán Cortés from 1519 to 1525. After his death, he was deified by the Itza people of the Tayasal region and referred to as Tziminchác.

Acquired by Cortés in 1519, Morzillo played a significant role during his expedition to Mexico, particularly during the siege of Mexico-Tenochtitlan in 1521. Following this, Cortés took Morzillo on an expedition to Honduras. After suffering a hoof injury, the horse was offered by Cortés to the Itza of the Tayasal region but died shortly thereafter due to inadequate care.

Posthumously, Morzillo became the focus of a cult among the Itza, lasting for approximately one hundred years. The Itza revered him as a thunder god, likely influenced by the use of arquebuses by the Spaniards. His statue was found in the town of Flores by two Franciscan missionaries, 95 years after the passage of Cortés. It was definitively destroyed in 1697 during Martín de Ursúa's campaign.

The cult of Tziminchác continues to be remembered in local traditions.

== Sources ==
=== Documents from the colonial era ===
Sources concerning Hernán Cortés' horses include letters (relaciones) he wrote to Charles V, which provide firsthand accounts of his experiences and observations. These letters were translated into French by Désiré Charnay in his work Lettres de Fernand Cortès à Charles-Quint sur la découverte et la conquête du Mexique (1896).

Another significant source is the chronicle by Bernal Díaz del Castillo (1496-1584), titled Historia verdadera de la conquista de la nueva España. Díaz del Castillo offers detailed descriptions of the individual qualities and coat colors of the horses used by Cortés' troops.

Spanish historian Juan de Villagutierre (1650-1700) references the veneration of Tziminchác in his Historia de la conquista de la provincia de el Itza. Similarly, Diego Lopez de Cogolludo discusses this veneration in his Histoire du Yucatan.

Charnay may have drawn some of his information regarding Cortés' horse from Antonio de Solís y Ribadeneyra's work, Historia de la conquista de México, población y progresos de la América septentrional, conocida por el nombre de Nueva España.

=== Recent historical studies ===
Several authors have explored the subject of Morzillo in recent years, including:

- Robert Bontine Cunninghame Graham (1852-1936): A politician, writer, and adventurer, he published an article titled Hippomorphous in 1914, focusing on Morzillo;
- Robert Denhardt (1912-1989): A historian and professor at Texas A&M University, Denhardt wrote about Cortés' horses in 1937 and dedicated an entire article to Morzillo in 1938;
- Ángel Cabrera (1879-1960): A zoologist, Cabrera's work from 1945 was translated into French in 2004 under the title Chevaux d'Amérique;
- Pierre Ivanoff (1924-1974): An explorer and filmmaker, Ivanoff included a chapter on Morzillo in his 1968 book Découvertes chez les Maya;
- Deb Bennett: A paleontologist, Bennett discusses horses in the New World in her 1998 book Conquerors.

== Horse names ==
=== Spanish names ===
Robert M. Denhardt claims the horse is called "Morzillo". Désiré Charnay uses the name "Morcillo".

Deb Bennett translates Morzillo as "the tuft," citing a distinctive tuft of hair on its neck, which is considered a sign of good fortune in Arab traditions.

Argentine zoologist Ángel Cabrera uses the term "Morcillo," which historically referred to a black horse with reddish highlights (seal brown). The color terminology in 16th-century Spanish sources can be challenging to translate accurately into modern Spanish.

Désiré Charnay (1908) also referred to this horse as "Marzillo".

=== Mayan name ===
The divine name given to this horse in Maya Itza is Tziminchác, also spelled Tziminchác by French ethnologist Jacques Soustelle and anthropologist James D. Nations, Tizimin Chac by historian John Henderson, or Tziunchán by Bennett.

Soustelle proposes the translation "horse of thunder", while anthropologist Grant D. Jones elaborates, translating it as "horse of thunder and lightning". Nations translates it as "tapir of thunder", explaining that the tapir is the rainforest animal most resembling a horse.

Religious historian Michel Graulich does not support either etymology but notes a linguistic connection between the Mayan word "Tzimin" and the Nahuatl word "Tzitzimitl".

== Descriptions ==
Based on Bernal Diaz, Bennett describes the animal as elegant, with a dark bay or black coat.

== History ==
Morzillo's story is notable in the context of horses mentioned in historical accounts. His black horse is described as having played a significant role in history, according to Robert Bontine Cunninghame Graham in Hippomorphous. Despite Morzillo's fame, Bernal Díaz del Castillo suggests that he may not have been the best horse among Hernán Cortés' troop.

=== Cortés' acquisition of Morzillo ===
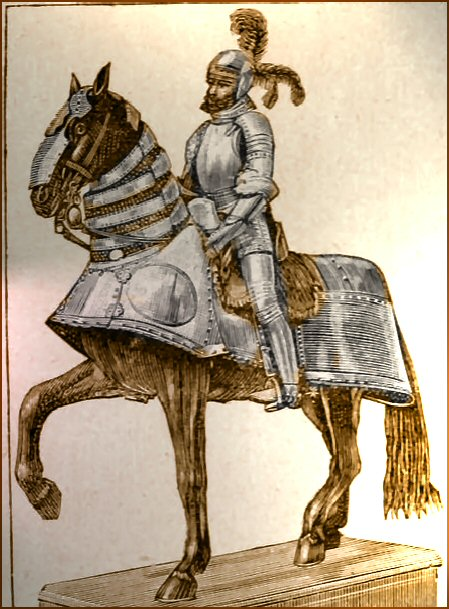
Equestrian statue of Hernán Cortés (the name of the mount is not specified).

Bernal Díaz del Castillo provides accounts of Hernán Cortés' horses during the early stages of his expedition. Upon leaving Cuba in February 1519, Cortés rode a brown zain horse that later died at San Juan de Ulúa, the location where the squadron arrived on April 21. The cause of death remains uncertain, as it could have been due to battle wounds or disease. Following this horse, Cortés mounted "El Arriero," and subsequently rode a third horse named "Romo", which arrived on the same ship as Morzillo.

On July 9, 1519, shortly after establishing the colony of Veracruz, Cortés captured a ship sent by Diego Velasquez, the governor of Cuba, and appropriated its cargo, which included a dozen horses from Jamaica. Morzillo, at this time, remained in Veracruz and was not ridden during the La Noche Triste episode on June 30, 1520. However, Díaz notes that Cortés did ride Morzillo during the siege of Mexico-Tenochtitlan from March to August 1521.

=== Stopover in the Tayasal ===
As the conquest of Mexico neared completion, on 13 March 1525, Cortés and his men made a stop in the Tayasal valley. They hunted deer for meat, which was relatively easy due to the animals' approachable nature. Unfortunately, one of Cortés' other horses, Palacio Rubias, succumbed to the heat during this stop. While crossing the stony hills known as El Paso del Alabastro and La Sierra de los Pedernales, Morzillo sustained a foot injury from a sharp stick, which could not be treated. Díaz recounts that while resting after the hunt, Cortés and his troops were approached by canoes from the Itza, inviting them to their village on Lake Petén Itza. Cortés accepted the invitation, bringing Morzillo along.

In a letter, Cortés attributed the decision to leave Morzillo with the Itza to the horse's foot injury, stating he was "obliged to leave my black horse (mi caballo morzillo) with a splinter in his foot". However, Díaz, writing later, suggested that Morzillo was given to the Itza due to exhaustion after the deer hunt, claiming the horse had lost all its body fat and could no longer stand. Ángel Cabrera argues that Cortés' version is more credible due to its proximity to the events. Spanish historian Juan de Villagutierre, while acknowledging the differing accounts, emphasized the significance of the horse's subsequent veneration by the Itza as a key fact.

=== Morzillo's gift to the Itza ===
Hernán Cortés held Morzillo in high regard and refused to have him slaughtered or sacrificed. Initially, Cortés contemplated returning for Morzillo via the Tayasal region and entrusted the horse to the care of the Itza cacique, Canek, who assured him that he would look after Morzillo. This episode is detailed in Cortés' fifth letter to Charles V, where he quotes Canek's promise. Consequently, Morzillo became the responsibility of the cacique of Tayasal.

The Itza, having never encountered horses before, took this responsibility seriously.They likely equated Morzillo with a thunder god, having observed the arquebuses fired by Cortés' mounted troops from a distance. Despite their good intentions, the Itza lacked the knowledge to properly care for a horse. They renamed Morzillo "Tziminchác," adorned him with flower necklaces, and attempted to feed him game and poultry to win his favor. According to Désiré Charnay, Morzillo was also given the flesh of sacrificial victims.

The horse died from lack of proper care.

== Veneration under the name of Tziminchác ==
=== Temple and statue of Tziminchác ===
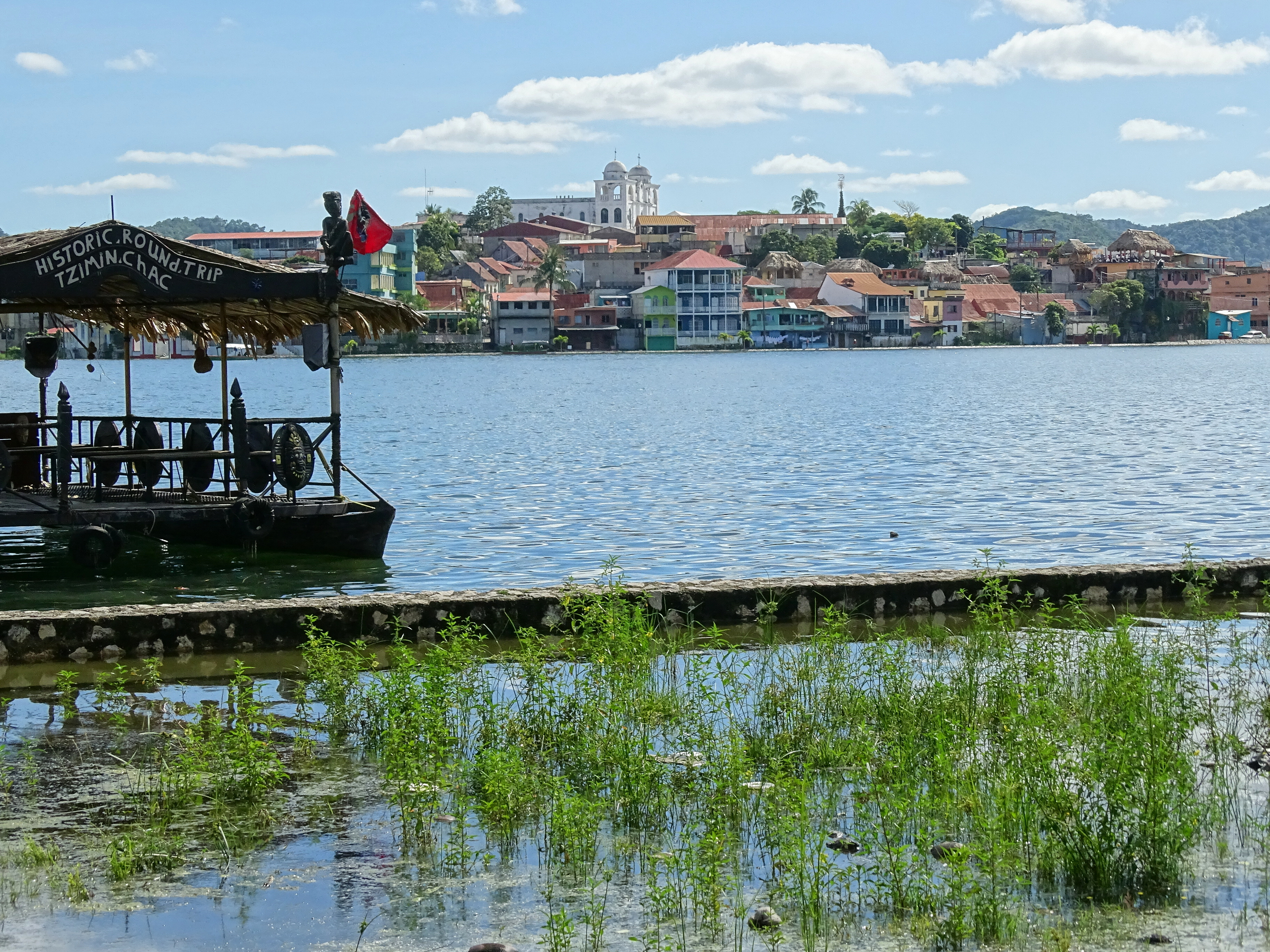
Tourist boat on Lake Petén Itzá named "Tziminchác". In the background, the town of Flores.

After Morzillo's death, the Itza transformed him into a thunder deity known as Tziminchác. They erected a temple in his honor and carved a statue in his likeness, with most sources indicating it was made of stone, while the Historia municipal del Reino de Yucatán suggests it was wooden.

Several theories explain this veneration. Filmmaker Pierre Ivanoff posits that the Itza feared Cortés' return and the vengeance of the spirit of the deceased horse.

Désiré Charnay, citing Diego López de Cogolludo, notes that the Itza believed the horse was responsible for the firing of arquebuses observed during a hunting party. Juan de Villagutierre views Tziminchác as an important addition to the Itza pantheon, whereas John Henderson considers him a minor divinity associated with lightning.

=== Franciscan missionaries visit ===
Cortés never returned for Morzillo, and it was not until 95 years later that Europeans revisited the region. While most sources date this visit to 1618, some, including Robert Cunninghame Graham, place it in 1697 during General Martín de Ursúa's military campaign.

During this visit, two Franciscan missionaries, fluent in the Itza language, sought to convert the locals to Christianity. They both spoke the Itza language. They discovered the statue of Tziminchác, a stone horse depicted sitting on its hips, in the largest temple. The missionaries were astonished, as there were no horses in the region, and the locals had only seen one through the statue. They learned about Morzillo's origins and the types of offerings made to him during his life.

Friar Bartolomé Fuensalida described Morzillo as an idol of an "irrational beast," akin to the deer the Itza hunted for food. According to Villagutierre, Father Juan de Orbita attempted to destroy the statue, leading to local outrage and a near-violent response against the missionaries.

=== Destruction of the Tziminchác temple (1697) ===
In 1697, General Martín de Ursúa led a campaign to subdue the Itza, resulting in the destruction of all the Tayasal temples, including the temple of Tziminchác, with Juan de Villagutierre present during the events. This campaign marked the definitive loss of the statue of Tziminchác, as well as the bones that were housed in the temple.

According to Pierre Ivanoff, this destruction contributed to a significant decline in European interest in Maya ruins and their associated cults for an extended period.

According to Taladoire, European interest in the Maya ruins and cults sank into a long period of oblivion.

=== Perpetuation of the legend ===
Despite the loss of the temple and its contents, the legend of Tziminchác has persisted in local oral traditions.

It is believed that the Itza acknowledged that their horse statue did not represent a god. Ivanoff notes that the Itza attempted to create a new statue at a site called Nic-Tun, which they transported on a pirogue to the island of Tayasal. However, the boat capsized and sank under the weight of the statue.

In a 2007 architecture thesis, Arturo Alejandro Sazo Lopez referenced a traditional performance known as the "dance of the little horse" (Baile del caballito), described as a remembrance of the "Horse of Cortés" that cannot be destroyed. This dance features its music and lyrics and was reportedly first performed by a local gentleman from Flores named Vicente.

Additionally, the legend of Tziminchác has inspired various literary works. French poet Guillaume Apollinaire invented a novel titled Tzimin-Chac, attributed to the fictitious author "Louis Bréon," a name inspired by philosopher Morvan Bréon. French-Belgian author Diane Ducret also referenced the Tziminchác legend in her 2013 work, Corpus Equi.

== See also ==
- Hernán Cortés
- Horse worship

== Bibliography ==
- Bennett, Deb (1998). Conquerors : The Roots of New World Horsemanship. Amigo Publications, Inc. ISBN 978-0-9658533-0-9.
- Cabrera, Ángel (2004). Chevaux d'Amérique [American horses] (in French) (1st ed.). Éditions du Rocher. ISBN 2-268-05129-3.
- Chamay, Désiré (1904). "Les explorations de Téobert Maler" [Téobert Maler's explorations]. Journal de la Société des américanistes (in French). 1 (3): 289–308. JSTOR 44387138.
- Cunninghame, R. B. (1914). Hippomorphous. London: The English review.
- Denhart, Robert (1937). "The Truth about Cortes's Horses". The Hispanic American Historical Review. 17 (4): 525–532. JSTOR 2507142.
- Denhart, Robert (1938). "El Morzillo". Southwest Review. 23 (2): 184–188. ISSN 0038-4712. JSTOR 43466454.
- Ivanoff, Pierre (1968). "Sur les traces du cheval de Cortez" [In the footsteps of the Cortez horse]. Découvertes chez les Maya [Discoveries among the Maya]. Les énigmes de l'univers (in French). Paris: Robert Laffont.
