= Apoxpalon =

16th century Mayan merchant and elected regional ruler of the Acalan

Apoxpalon (fl. 1525), also known of as Paxbolonacha, was a Maya merchant from the Acalan who was elected as a regional ruler of Itzamkanac, the capital in the Acalan. His election demonstrates the Chontal Maya system of raising established veterans of the trade system to high office and he was on the throne in 1525.
