= Putún =

Indigenous Mayan ethnic group

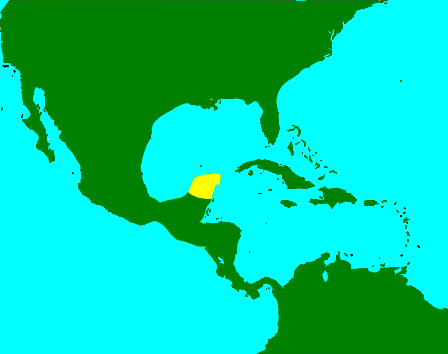
Yucatán Peninsula

Putún is the name of a Mayan ethnic group on the periphery of Pre-Columbian Maya civilization, generally considered a synonym for the Chontal Maya, though it also referred to the closely related Chʼol people. They were originally based in the delta of the Usumacinta and Grijalva Rivers, a region of waterways, lakes, and swamps in which aquatic transport dominated, as it did around the Laguna de Términos and through the numerous rivers that ended there. The Putun established two main urban centers: Potonchán, situated in the mouth of the Grijalva River in the current state of Tabasco, and Itzamkanac, near the Candelaria River, which ends at the Laguna de Términos in Campeche.

Division of Maya juristictions or chiefdoms in the 16th century, according to Ralph L. Roys

They displaced much of the older leadership of the Maya Lowlands during the Late Classic and Postclassic. The Putún, who came from the Gulf coast in the northwest region of the Maya area, are generally held to have been more Mexicanized than their contemporaries. They were associated with the Puuc architectural style and distinctive orangeware pottery. The Itza are often considered a group of Putún Maya, and Chakán Putún and the Chetumal Province also had Putun origins.

== Etymology ==
The term Putun was defined as "stinking" as early as 1527, though Ralph Roys doubts this was the original sense. In the Chʼol language, the word has the meaning of "peaceful".

== Area of influence ==
Groups of the Putún were, throughout their development, neighbors with groups of Nahuas who influenced them linguistically. Like the majority of groups that inhabited lacustrine zones, the Putún were navigators and merchants who controlled many commercial maritime routes around the Yucatán Peninsula from the Laguna de Términos in Campeche to the Sula Valley in Honduras.

As such, they extended their influence from villages in the jungles of Tabasco and Chiapas to the coast of the Yucatán Peninsula. Precisely because they lived in an alluvial zone, they left few archaeological remnants that would speak to the Putunes' prehispanic importance, although when they integrated with other peninsular groups, a process that had already occurred by the Mesoamerican post-classical period, they became the inheritors of many of the archeological sites located in territories they inhabited.

== Historical data ==
The Probanza de Pablo Paxbolón, which was discovered and translated by France V. Scholes and Ralph L. Roys attracted the interest of some Mayanists, particularly Eric S. Thompson, who Scholes and Roys worked with to reconstruct the pre-Columbian history of this ethnic group.

After the classic Mayan collapse, which radically altered Mesoamerican geopolitics, the Putunes saw an era of expansion and, thanks to various migrations, reached such distant regions as the eastern coast of the Yucatán Peninsula, territory that belongs to Belize and Honduras today, where they established provinces or chiefdoms and confederated villages dedicated to trade and other economically productive activities.

During the Spanish conquest of the Yucatán, Putún territory was thought to have extend from the Copilco River to Comalcalco in the west (in what is now the state of Tabasco), through the deltas of the Usumacinta and Grijalva Rivers, passing through the Laguna de Términos and the Candelaria River Basin up to what is now the city of Champotón in Campeche.

The toponomy of the region the Putún originally inhabited invites the assumption that there was intermingling, as typically occurs in border zones, between the Putun and the Nahuas. The paytonymics that, even today, are found in the region indicate this as well.

Three provinces of Nahua origin, which were used to sustain constant wars, were found nestled in the territory dominated by the Chontal Maya:

- Ahualulco or Ayahualulco, a group of settlements on the western coast of the state of Tabasco, nearly within the current borders of the state of Veracruz.
- Huimango and Cimatán, in the municipality of Cunduacán, Tabasco.
- Xicalango, which was located between what are now the states of Tabasco and Campeche.

This explains why many names among the Tabascan population are in Nahuatl.

== Connection with the Itza ==
For some scholars, there is an identity between the Putunes and the Itza people who arrived to the Yucatán during the early classical period. There is mention of an extant relationship between a Putún group settled in Chakán Putún that was thrown out and immigrated to Petén, in what is now Guatemala, and from there towards the coast of the Caribbean (Bacalar). Then they again headed towards the west through the north of the Yucatán Peninsula, founding cities like Chichén Itzá, Izamal, and Mayapán. All of this would have occurred between the second and fifth centuries CE. There is not, however, historical certainty surrounding these migrations and the dates which they occurred, nor for the hypothesis that establishes that those which were identified as members of the Itza had been Putunes in reality.

== See also ==
- Chontal Maya
- History of the Yucatán Peninsula
- Spanish conquest of Yucatán
- Itza people
- Kowoj
- Kuchkabal
