= Tabscoob =

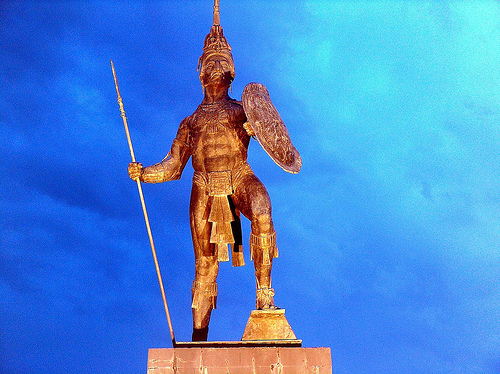
Monument to Tabscoob in Villahermosa, Tabasco.

Tabscoob was a halach uinik (Maya ruler) of the Potonchán jurisdiction, known for leading the Chontal Maya in the Battle of Centla against Spanish forces led by Hernán Cortés on March 14, 1519.

Tabscoob's administration maintained commercial ties with the Mexicas and other Maya jurisdictions, especially with the jurisdiction of Chakán Putum, who—after having contact with the expeditions of Francisco Hernández de Córdoba and Juan de Grijalva—warned the Chontal to take precautions. On June 8, 1518, Juan de Grijalva landed in the province of Potonchán and met Tabscoob to whom, it is said, Grijalva gave his green velvet doublet.

== War against Xicalango in 1513 ==
Between Potonchán and the island of Tris was a Nahuatl town called Xicalango, which was a major port on the Gulf of Mexico, but being different from the Maya race, had constant friction with Potonchán since the Xicalangos frequently crossed territory within the province of Tabasco. This led to a war in the year 1513 in which Tabscoob led an army of 20,000 men and defeated the Xicalangos.

It was the custom among the natives that the defeated make various gifts to the victors. Thus, the chief Tabscoob received a large number of slaves including Malintzin, famously known as "La Malinche."

== Meeting with Juan de Grijalva in 1518 ==
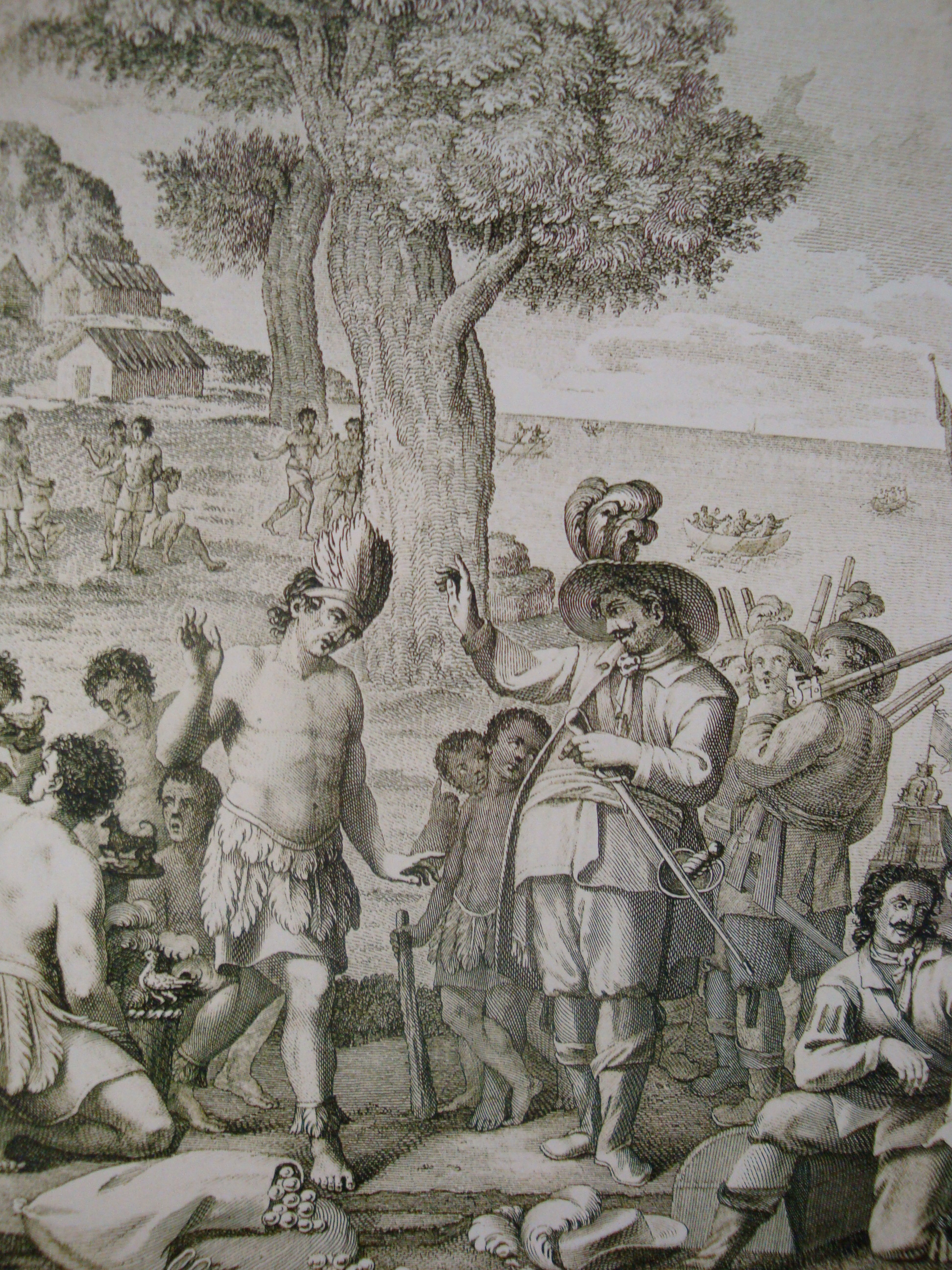
Meeting of the Maya chief Tabscoob with the Spaniard Juan de Grijalva in 1518.

On June 8, 1518, the Spaniard Juan de Grijalva landed at Potonchán. With the help of Maya interpreters, he began to engage in a friendly dialogue with the natives, as well as flattering them with gifts. Grijalva asked if they would call their boss to meet and confer with him. Thus, in time, Chief Tabscoob appeared with his nobles, greeting the Spanish captain. During the talk, both figures exchanged gifts: to Grijalva, Tabscoob presented gold plates in the form of armor and some feathers; whereas Grijalva gave the Maya chief his green velvet doublet.

Tabscoob told Grijalva of a place called Culua that was "toward where the sun set..." there was much more of that material. Grijalva in turn, spoke with the Maya chief with courtesy, admitting that he came in the name of a great lord named Charles V, who was very good, and he wanted to have them as vassals. Tabscoob responded that they lived happily as they were, and that they needed no other lord, and that if Grijalva wanted to preserve his friendship with Tabscoob, the Spanish expedition should leave. Grijalva, after stocking water and provisions, embarked on his way to Culua (modern-day San Juan de Ulúa).

== Arrival of Hernán Cortés in 1519 ==
On March 12, 1519, Spanish conquistador Hernán Cortés reached the mouth of the Grijalva River. He decided to anchor his ships and enter the river in skiffs, looking for the great city of Indians described by Juan de Grijalva. Cortés landed in a place called Punta de Palmares right at the mouth of the river.

Cortés said, by way of a translator, to some Indians who were in a boat that he and his men "would do them no harm, [and that] they came in peace and only wanted to speak with them." But Cortés, seeing that the natives were still threatening, commanded weapons be brought onto the skiffs and handed them to archers and musketeers, and he began planning how to attack the town.

=== Takeover of Potonchán ===
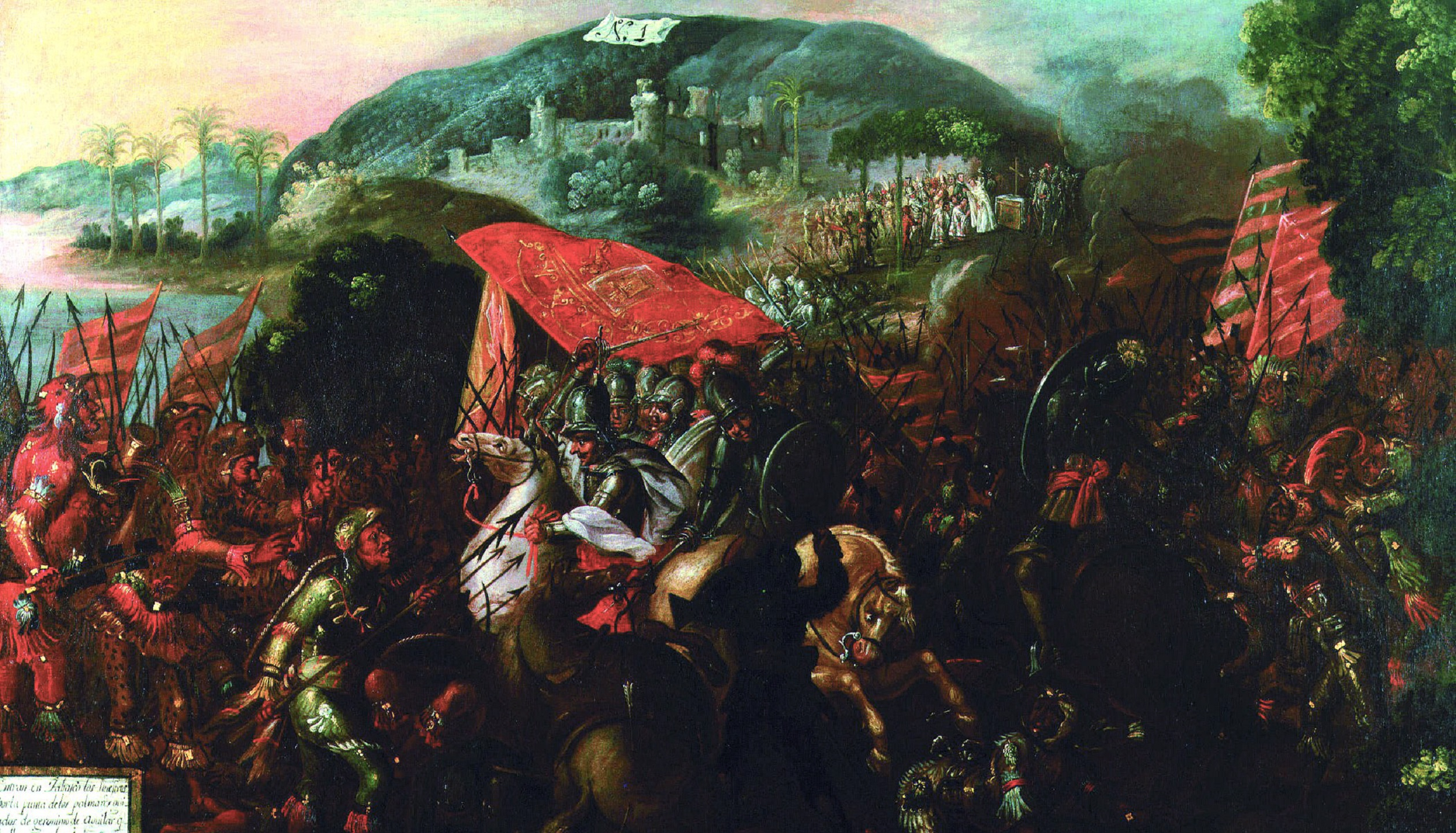
The entrance of Hernán Cortés into the city of "Potonchán" or "Tabasco."

The next day, March 13, 1519, Cortés devised a strategy to attack Potonchán. He sent Alonso de Avila with one hundred soldiers who were on the road leading to the village, while Cortés and the other group of soldiers went in the skiffs. There, on the shore, Cortés made a "requerimiento" (requisition) in front of a notary of the king named Diego de Godoy, to let them disembark, thus issuing the first notarial act in Mexico.

Given the refusal of the Indians, Cortés decided to attack, starting the fight. The hosts of Tabscoob and Cortes met in full combat. The forces of Alonso de Ávila arrived at the rear of the settlement, making the natives flee and consummating the Spanish conquistadors' takeover of the town.

=== Battle of Centla ===
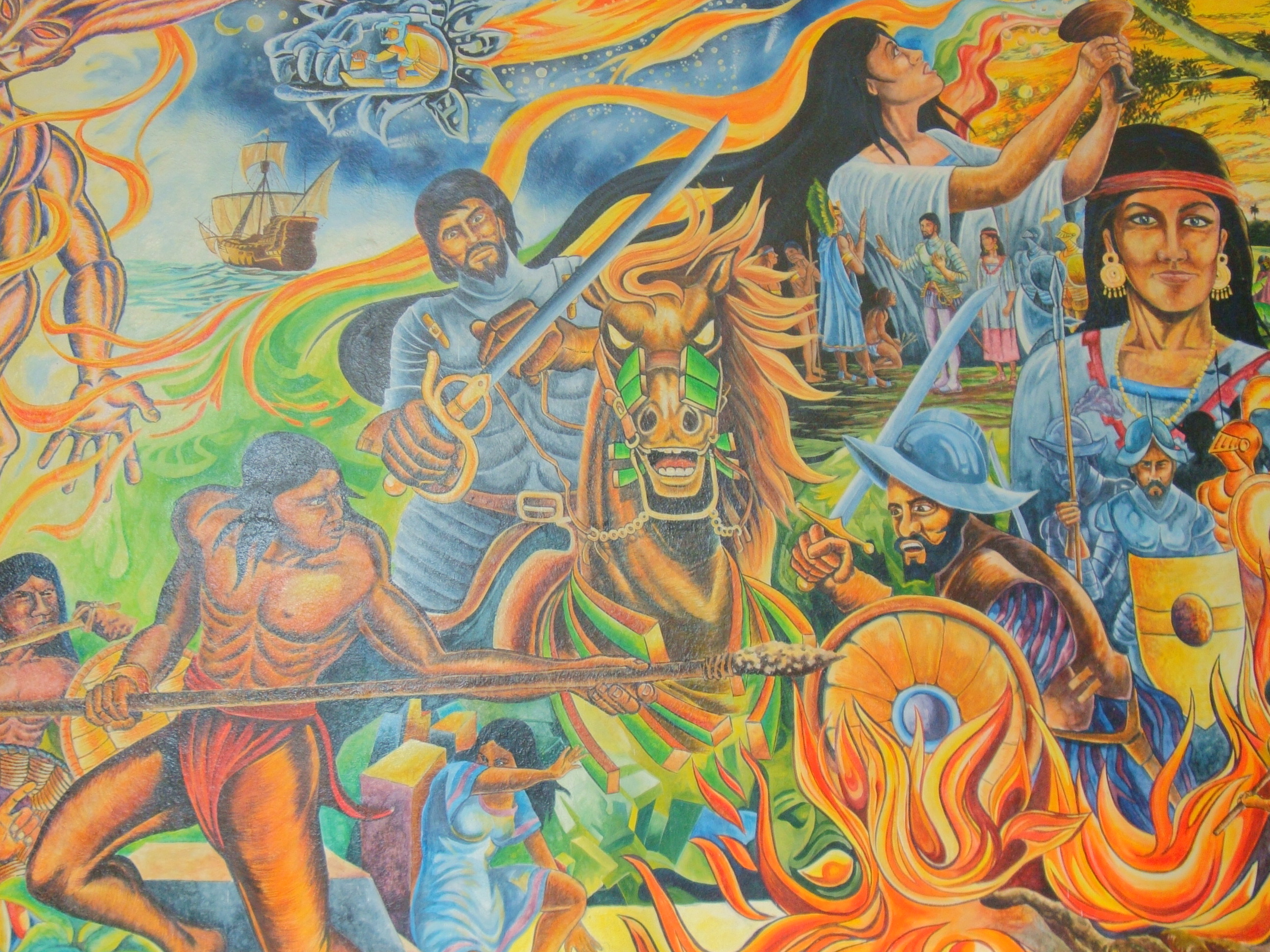
Battle of Centla between the hosts of Tabscoob and the army of Hernán Cortés.

On March 14, the hosts of Tabscoob, estimated by Cortes to be 40,000 men, fought on the plains of Centla against the Spaniards led by Hernán Cortés. The Battle of Centla ensued, which would be the first major battle of the Spanish conquistadors in what later became New Spain. The power of the Spaniards' firearms and the surprise and fear caused by the appearance of the cavalry (since the natives had never seen horses and thought that animal and rider were one) eventually gave victory to the Spanish army of over 410 soldiers.

Days later, on April 16, chief Tabscoob and his entourage appeared before Cortes, swearing allegiance and subjection to the Spanish Crown. And, as was the Indian tradition, Tabscoob gifted 20 native women to Cortés, including doña Marina la lengua, who would become a translator for Cortés in the conquest of Mexico.

But the conquest of Tabasco was far from achieved, as the Indians often rebelled against the Spaniards. It would take 45 years of struggles and intense military campaigns, before the Spanish conquistadors could break the fighting spirit of the indigenous people of Tabasco.

== Name of the state of Tabasco ==
It is thought that the name of the Mexican state of Tabasco comes from the name of this ruler. There is a monument in the state capital of Villahermosa dedicated to his memory.

== Bibliography ==
- Cabrera Bernat, Cipriano Aurelio (1987), Viajeros en Tabasco: Textos, Biblioteca básica tabasqueña (in Spanish), vol. 15 (1st ed.), Villahermosa, Tabasco: Gobierno del Estado de Tabasco, Instituto de Cultura de Tabasco, ISBN 968-889-107-X
- Gil y Sáenz, Manuel (1979), Compendio Histórico, Geográfico y Estadístico del Estado de Tabasco, Serie Historia (México) (in Spanish), vol. 7 (2nd ed.), México: Consejo Editorial del Gobierno del Estado de Tabasco, OCLC 7281861
