= Itzamkanac =

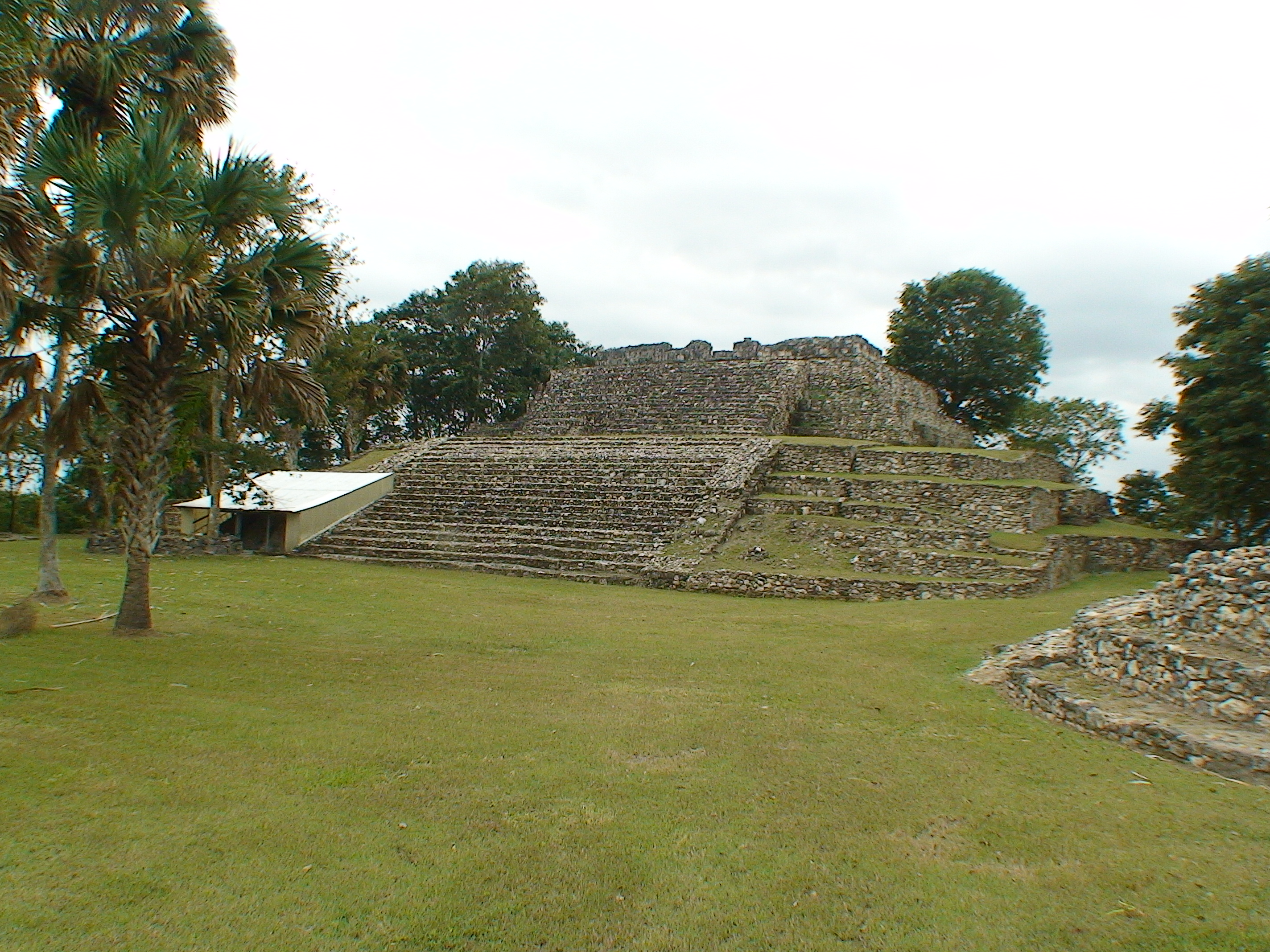
- Structure 1

- Location within Mexico Location within Campeche
- Type: Ancient Maya city
- Periods: Preclassic - Classic - Postclassic
- Cultures: Maya civilization
- Location: Mexico
- Region: Acalan

History
- Built: 600 BC
- Built by: Chontal Maya
- Abandoned: 1557

Itzamkanac, also known as El Tigre, is an ancient Pre-Columbian city and archaeological Maya site located in the municipality of Candelaria in the state of Campeche, Mexico. Itzamkanac was the capital of the pre-Hispanic Acalan province ruled by the Chontal Maya or Putún Maya until the arrival and encounter with the Spanish conquistadors.

== Location ==
Itzamkanac is built on a hill on the banks of the Candelaria River in southwestern Campeche, Mexico. This location gave the site a strategic political position as a river port that developed great trading and commercial activity with other Maya and Mesoamerican sites.

== Architecture ==
Itzamkanac is integrated by six architectural complexes and 3 ballgame courts, the ceremonial center covers approximately 5 km^{2} and consists of 2 plazas with large structures and platforms. A large number of monumental stucco masks as decoration of platforms have been discovered in the site, this sculptures represent the faces of rulers divinized with mythological concepts and finely dressed with headdresses. Structure 1 is a large building with smaller platforms on the top, one of this platforms named Platform 1A is a round temple dedicated to god Kukulkan.

== History ==
The occupation and development of Itzamkanac began around 600 to 300 BC in the Middle Preclassic period of the Maya civilization, and extended past the end of the Postclassic period, several decades after the arrival and contact with the Spanish conquistadors, then started a period of decadency until it was fully abandoned in 1557. Its peak of development occurred during the terminal classic and postclassic periods, during this time it became the capital of the powerful province of Acalan-Tixchel. Upon the arrival of the Spanish conquistadors, Itzamkanac had a major political power as a great trading port of the Maya region and the city was referenced and documented in several colonial writings. The population has been estimated in the neighborhood of 10,000 people. Economic products included copal, dyes and cotton.

In 1525, Hernán Cortés and a group of conquistadors and Mexica prisoners arrived to the province of Acalan passing through its capital Itzamkanac and several of its other towns as part of the route on Cortés trip to Las Hibueras (present-day Honduras), they were well received by Apaxpalon, ruler of Itzamkanac and the province of Acalan. In a city of the province of Acalan known as Taxahá, Cortés executed Cuauhtémoc, the last tlatoani of the Mexicas.

The Chontal chief of Acalan, Pablo Paxbolon, described in a colonial document known as Papeles de Paxbolón Maldonado (Paxbolón Maldonado Papers) several details about Itzamkanac such as the great cult that the city had towards the god Kukulkan, this could have been the result of the great contact that Itzamkanac had as a great trading point with major centers in central Mexico.
