= Acalan =

Postclassic Maya polity

Acalan (Chontal Maya: Tamactun, Nahuatl: Acallan) was a Chontal Maya region in what is now southern Campeche, Mexico. Its capital was Itzamkanac (modern El Tigre on the right bank of the Candelaria River). The people of Acalan were called Mactun in the Chontal Maya language.

Unlike the rest of the Chontal Maya region, cacao (although present) was not produced in economically significant quantities in Acalan, though its merchants still played the role of middlemen in its distribution. Other products they distributed included gold, cotton, honey, dyes, body paint, pitch pine, copal, red shell beads, and salt (this last one not being sourced locally). Acalan maintained a trade post at Nito in Guatemala, and sent merchants to Potonchan.

Much of the nobility had Nahuatl names, indicating either an ethnic Nahua presence or the use of Nahuatl as a trade language. Acalan was governed as a sort of merchant republic where the most influential merchant became the ruler. However, his power was checked by councils of merchants representing the four wards of Itzamkanac. While the ruler's patron deity was Kukulkan, called Kukulchan in Chontal, the four quarters of the town had their own patron deities, namely Ix Chel (patron of weaving, women, and childbirth), Ikchaua (patron of cacao and merchants), Tabay (patron of hunters), and Cabtanilcab. Ix Chel was especially important, and maidens were raised with the express purpose of being sacrificed to her. The rulers of Acalan were descended from Auxaual, who migrated from Cozumel in the late fourteenth century and founded a polity at Tenosique.

Cuauhtemoc, ruler of Tenochtitlan, capital of the Aztec Empire, was executed by Hernán Cortés while they were stopped in Itzamkanac in 1525. The ruler of Acalan at this time was Paxbolonacha.
