= Montejo expedition =

Spanish maritime expedition, 1527–1528

Coordinates: 19°N 88°W

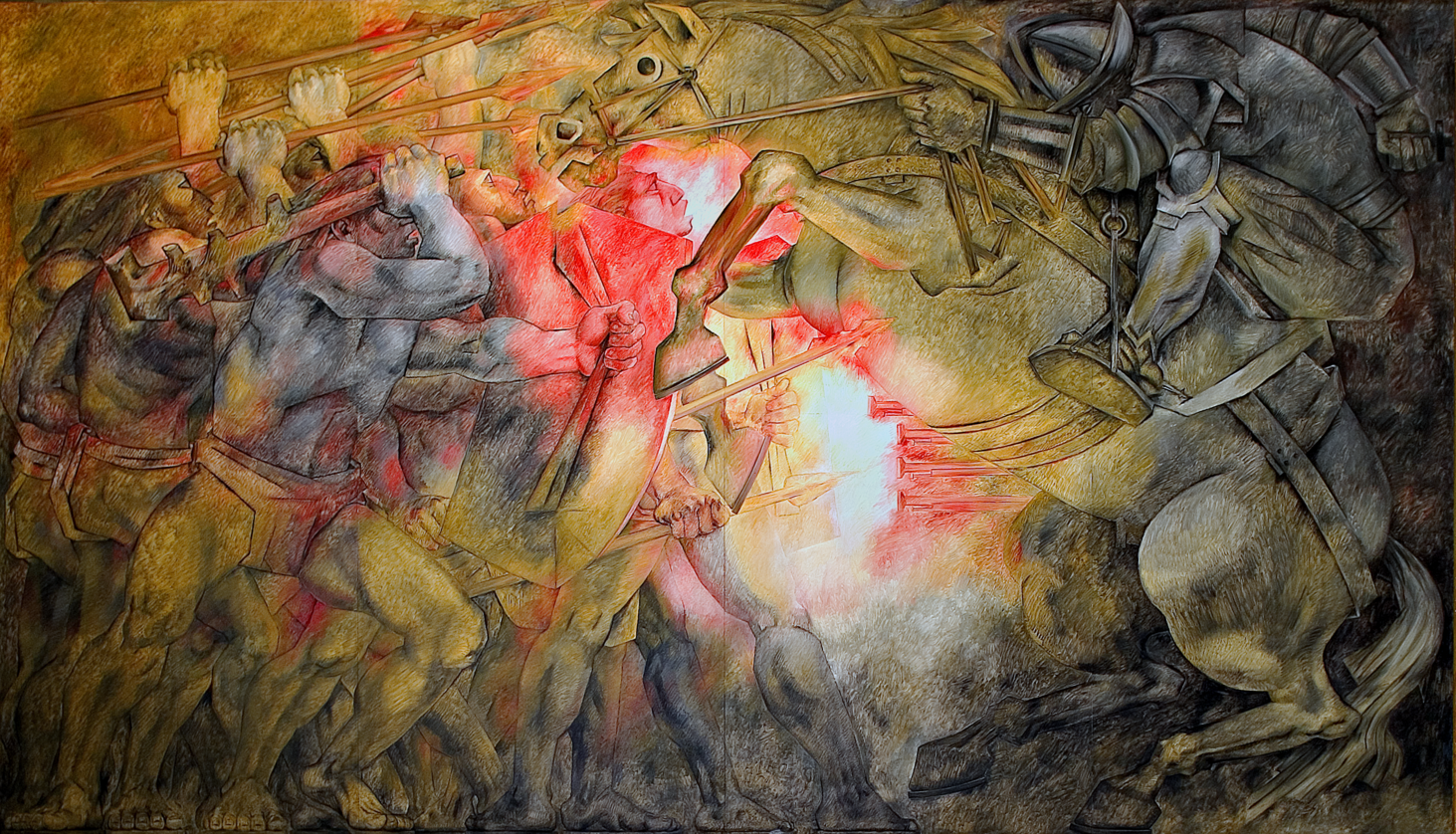
- La conquista by Castro Pacheco, 1974 (Note: Mural in Palacio de Gobierno in Merida, Yucatan. Depicts the Spanish conquest of Yucatan, showing (unarmoured) Maya clubmen and spearmen (left) charging armoured Spanish cavalry (right).)
- Sponsor: Francisco de Montejo
- Country: New Spain
- Leader: Francisco de Montejo
- Start: Seville late June 1527
- End: Veracruz by September 1528
- Goal: To conquer and settle Postclassic polities of the Maya Lowlands in Yucatan
- Ships: San Jerónimo, Nicolasa, La Gavarra, unnamed fourth ship (Note: Miguel Ferrer master for the San Jerónimo; Ochoa master for the Nicolasa; masters for the La Gavarra and fourth ship unknown. The La Gavarra was a brigantine or caravel.)
- Crew: > 250 men (Note: Led by Montejo and: Alonso Dávila, Antón Sánchez Calabrés, Pedro de los Ríos, Pedro de Añasco, Pedro de Lugones, Pedro González, Hernando Palomino, Pedro Gaitán, and possibly Andrés de Calleja and Roberto Alemán. Included crown representatives Pedro de Luna and Hernando de Cueto, and frays Juan Rodríguez de Caraveo, Pedro Fernández and Gregorio de San Martín.)
- Fatalities: Unknown
- Achievements: Won two battles against Chikinchel; Opened the Spanish conquest of Yucatan

The Montejo expedition (Note: Also entrada or campaign for expedition.) was a Spanish maritime and military expedition of conquest against Postclassic Maya polities of the Maya Lowlands in the Yucatan Peninsula in 1527 to 1528. The campaign opened the Spanish conquest of Yucatan, and thus that of the Maya, and was led by conquistador Francisco de Montejo, who had been named adelantado and thereby authorised to undertake the said conquest for the recently-founded New Spain by the Spanish crown in late 1526. The itinerary included at least Ekab and Chikinchel in the northern lowlands, in modern Quintana Roo and Yucatan, Mexico, and Chetumal in the south, in modern Belize. Montejo and his expeditioners were welcome and so offered aid in Ekab, but were then decidedly not welcome in Chikinchel, where their presence or demands provoked open hostilities, which the Spanish won. The expedition was likewise unwelcome in Chetumal, but said province diverted the adelantado's attention sans armed engagement via a successful deceptive operation. Consequently, the campaign had mixed results.

== Background ==
The Maya civilisation first come to the attention of the Spanish in early 1517, after the disastrous Cordoba expedition from Spanish Cuba to Postclassic polities of the Northern Maya Lowlands, in the Yucatan Peninsula, including Ekab and neighbouring provinces. Cordoba's surviving company brought back thrilling reports of rich lands, prompting the conquistadors of Santiago to renewed exploratory zeal, and shortly leading to a smallpox epidemic in the Maya Lowlands. On 8 December 1526, Salamancan conquistador Francisco de Montejo, a principal subordinate to Juan de Grijalva in his 1518 voyage and to Hernán Cortés in his 1519 trip, secured a capitulacion ('letters patent') naming him adelantado of Yucatan and Cozumel from Charles I, whereby the Spanish crown authorised him to conquer the coincident lowland polities, to annex their territory to recently-established New Spain, and to rule over and settle the Spanish province thereby founded (Spanish Yucatan). This done, Montejo wasted no time in making preparations for the voyage, and named Alonso Dávila, a close colleague and fellow member of the Grijalva and Cortéz expeditionary companies, his second-in-command. Together, they engaged four ships (including the San Jerónimo, Nicolasa and La Gavarra) and over 250 men (including crown representatives and friars) in Seville.

== Expedition ==
1 Cozumel, in Ekab
2 Salamanca, in Ekab (first site)
3 Chauaka, in Chikinchel
4 Ake, in Chikinchel
5 Salamanca, in Ekab (first site, again)
6 Chetumal, in Chetumal
7 Ulua
8 Salamanca, in Ekab (second site)

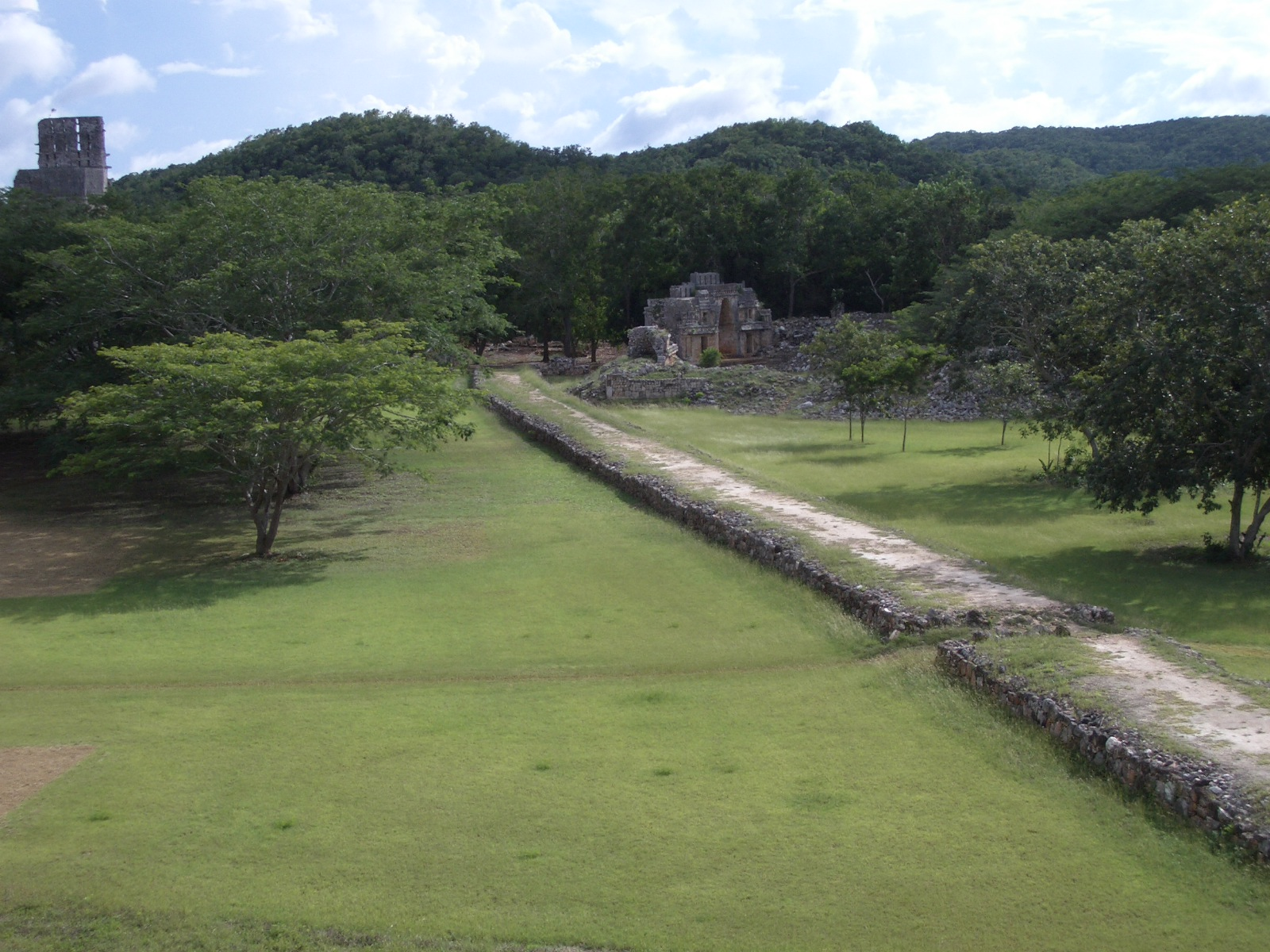
Ake was a double-walled settlement in Chikinchel, connected to the northern lowlands by a network of sak beo'ob ('lime plaster roads') like that shown (Note: In. Photograph shows a sak be leading to Labna Arch (top right) and El Mirador (top left) in Labna, Yucatan.)

The Montejo expedition set sail from Seville in late June 1527, were thoroughly refitted and revictualled in Santo Domingo, and landed in Cozumel in late September 1527. The flotilla were reportedly afforded a warm reception by the islanders and Naum Pat (the local batab or 'mayor'), allowing them to water for a few days before proceeding to the mainland. They explored their immediate landing site (in Ekab), and came upon the towns of Xelha and Zama, where they were similarly well-received, prompting Montejo to found a settlement in the area, christened Salamanca, in October 1527. Their substantial demands for foodstuffs soon grew irksome to locals, upon which Salamanca saw their supplies dwindle. In late 1527 or early 1528, after a trying period of near-famine and disease, the Spanish moved northwards. With Pat's intercession, they were purportedly kindly welcomed throughout the province. In the spring of 1528, the Montejo party entered Chauaka, capital of neighbouring Chikinchel. Here, the Spanish were decidedly unwelcome, sparking a skirmish which Montejo won. They next headed to Ake (likewise in Chikinchel), where they were likewise engaged (in an encounter now known as the Battle of Ake (Note: Also batalla de Aké in Spanish.)) and where the Spanish were similarly victorious. This northern incursion having proved a success, Montejo headed back south to Salamanca, arriving in mid or late summer of 1528. Here, the company (now whittled down to a party of 70 to 75 men) were provisioned from Santo Domingo by La Gavarra, whereupon they embarked on a two-pronged foray (by land and sea) southwards.

=== Southern leg ===
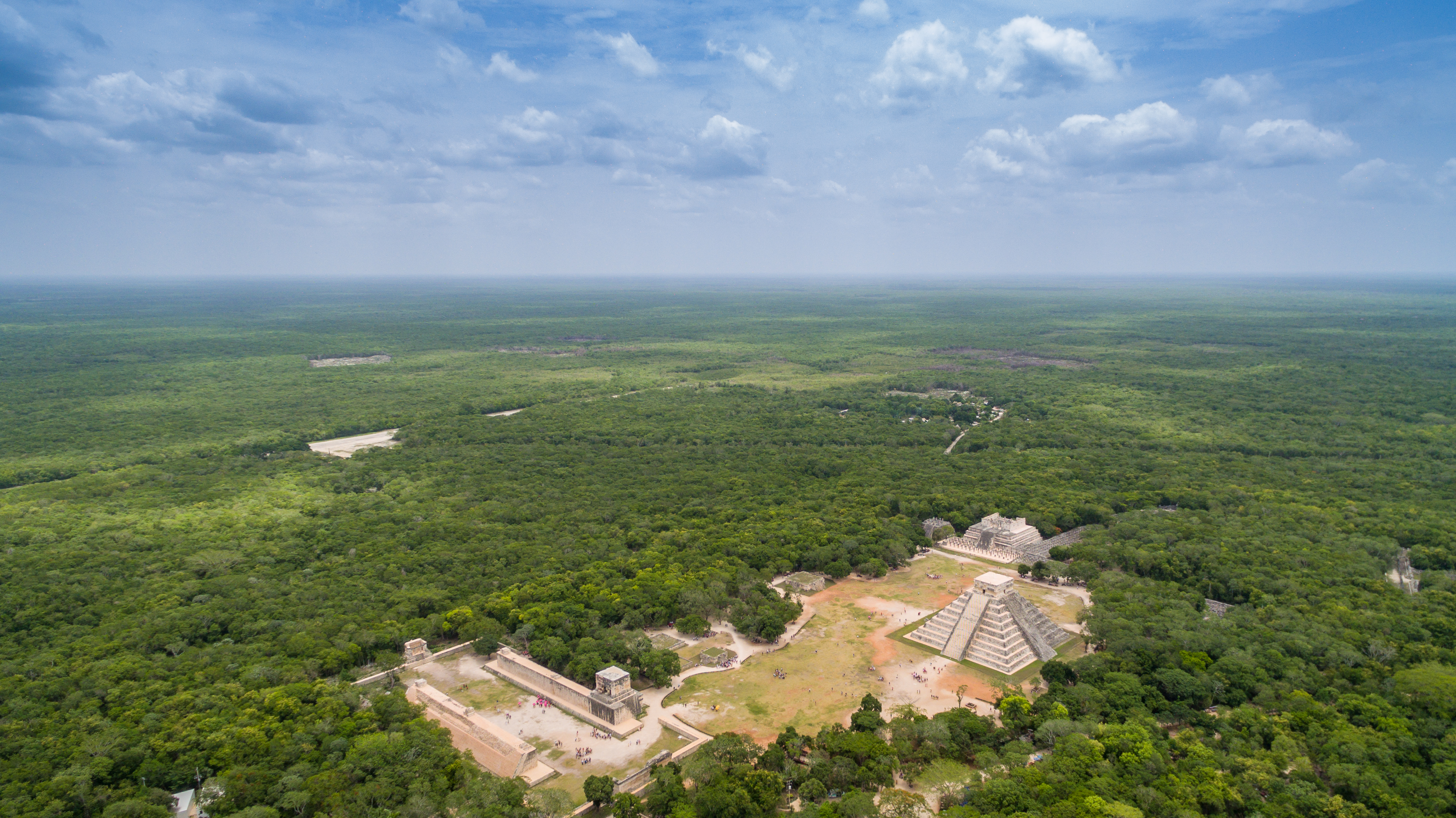
Cunning deception, especially in asymmetric warfare, may have been a Maya martial ideal, (Note: In. Possibly part of "a broader Mesoamerican ideal of poorer, younger, and less powerful heroes overcoming the odds to defeat their wealthier, authoritative antagonists", most famously manifested in the Popol Wuj, where "the young Hero Twins cleverly navigate a series of challenges to defeat the powerful, yet dim-witted lords of the underworld".) one the Spanish soon adapted to. In 1532 in Ciudad Real (occupied Chichen Itza; ruins shown), under siege by a large Maya force, the Spanish (under Montejo) escaped the Maya (who encircled them) by tying a famished dog to a church bell and placing food just out of reach. The bell rang through the night as the conquistadors slipped away, unnoticed by sentinels who likely presumed the Spanish were readying for imminent defeat.

For their southern entrada in the late summer of 1528, Montejo was to hug the eastern Yucatan coast with eight to ten men aboard the brigantine or caravel La Gavarra, whilst Davila took a parallel route by land with the majority of their men (some 40 to 55). They set the eponymous port and capital of southern Chetumal, in the Bay of Chetumal, as their rendezvous point, which Montejo reached first, having somehow managed to navigate through the barrier reef. Unsure of the reception awaiting them, Montejo and his men kidnapped three or four residents under cover of darkness, and set about interrogating them to gather intelligence. The hostages revealled the presence of Gonzalo Guerrero, a shipwrecked Spanish sailor who had entered (or been forced into) service for the local halach winik or 'governor' (Nachan Kan), and who was now nakom or 'commanding officer' of the province's forces (or militia). Montejo despatched one of his captives to Guerrero, inviting the nakom to break rank and join the Spanish conquest, but was rebuffed.

As Chetumal prepared for possible battle, Kan and Guerrero apparently sought to preclude it by keeping Davila (of whose approach they had seemingly had advance warning), presently thirty leagues north, from reaching the port. Prior to (or at about the date of) Montejo's arrival, runners had been (or were) sent northwards to Davila, with instructions to present themselves as friendly guides and lead the party westwards, whereupon they were to inform the lieutenant that Montejo had been lost at sea. The greater threat thus ostensibly dealt with, Kan and Guerrero now set out to buy time by placating Montejo, treating with him kindly and ministering to his crew's needs. Both feints apparently worked, as upon being informed that the Davila party had all perished, Montejo promptly weighed anchor and carried on southwards to Ulua River, where he exited the barrier reef's inner waters and sailed back north to Salamanca. Davila similarly took his guides' word at face value, and likewise marched back north on learning of Montejo's supposed demise.

== Aftermath ==
Montejo reached Salamanca (which had been moved north to Xamanha) after Davila, whereupon they discovered the Chetumal ruse. As Montejo had found its harbour exceedingly good, he determined that they would gather reinforcements in Veracruz for a renewed offensive on Chetumal. It was likely still late summer of 1528 when they set sail. By December of that year, Montejo and his alférez mayor Gonzalo Nieto had engaged sufficient men, provisions, and two large vessels in Veracruz and Mexico City for a renewed campaign. These plans were abruptly upset, however, when the adelantado received the Real Audiencia of Mexico's authorisation to pacify Maya polities in the north and west lowlands for New Spain. It was not until these polities (Chakan, Can Pech, Ah Canul) had been conquered that the adelantado would once again set his sights on Chetumal (in early 1531).

== See also ==
- Cordoba expedition – similar campaign in 1517
- Davila entrada – similar campaign in 1531

== Notes and references ==
=== References ===
1. Arranz Márquez, Luis (2018). "Pedro de Ledesma". Diccionario Biográfico electrónico. Real Academia de la Historia.
2. Chamberlain, Robert Stoner (1948). The conquest and colonization of Yucatan, 1517–1550. Carnegie Institution of Washington Publication. Vol. 582 (1st ed.). Washington, DC: Carnegie Institution of Washington. hdl:2027/txu.059173008409431.
3. Clendinnen I (2003) [First published 1987 by Cambridge University Press]. Ambivalent Conquests: Maya and Spaniard in Yucatan, 1517-1570. Cambridge Latin American Studies. Vol. 61 (2nd ed.). Cambridge: Cambridge University Press. ISBN 0-521-82031-6. LCCN 2002191144.
4. García Bernal, Manuela Cristina (2018). "Francisco de Montejo". Diccionario Biográfico electrónico. Real Academia de la Historia.
5. González Hernández, Cristina (2018). "Gonzalo Guerrero". Diccionario Biográfico electrónico. Real Academia de la Historia.
6. Jones, Grant D (1989). Maya resistance to Spanish rule : time and history on a colonial frontier (1st ed.). Albuquerque, NM: University of New Mexico Press. ISBN 082631161X.
7. Roys, Ralph L (1957). The Political Geography of the Yucatan Maya. Carnegie Institution of Washington Publication. Vol. 613 (1st ed.). Washington, DC: Carnegie Institution of Washington.
8. Tola de Habich F (2018). Yucatán 1517: El segundo descubrimiento de América (Hernández de Córdoba). Viajeros; Colección sextante. Vol. 6. Mérida, Yucatán: Universidad Nacional Autónoma de México. ISBN 978-607-30-1074-0. LCCN 2019447521.
9. Varela Marcos, Jesús (2018a). "Juan Díaz de Solís". Diccionario Biográfico electrónico. Real Academia de la Historia.
10. Varela Marcos, Jesús (2018b). "Vicente Yáñez Pinzón". Diccionario Biográfico electrónico. Real Academia de la Historia.
