= Can Pech =

Former Mayan chiefdom

Kuchkabal Kaan Peech
- 1441–1540
- Kuchkabals of Yucatan after 1461; Can Pech is center left.
- Capital: Campeche, Campeche
- Common languages: Official language: Yucatec
- Religion: Maya religion
- Government: Monarchy
- Halach Uinik
- Historical era: post classic period / Early Modern
  - Established: 1441
  - Disestablished: 1540
Preceded by	Succeeded by
League of Mayapan	New Spain

Can Pech (also Cun Pech, Kaan Pech, or Kaan Peech) was the name of a Maya chiefdom of the southwestern Yucatán Peninsula, before the arrival of the Spanish conquistadors in the sixteenth century. Can Pech was south of Ah Canul and north of Chakán Putum, on the coast of the Gulf of Mexico. In 1517, the population of its capital city was approximately 36,000, judging by the description of the city by Bernal Díaz del Castillo.

== Etymology ==
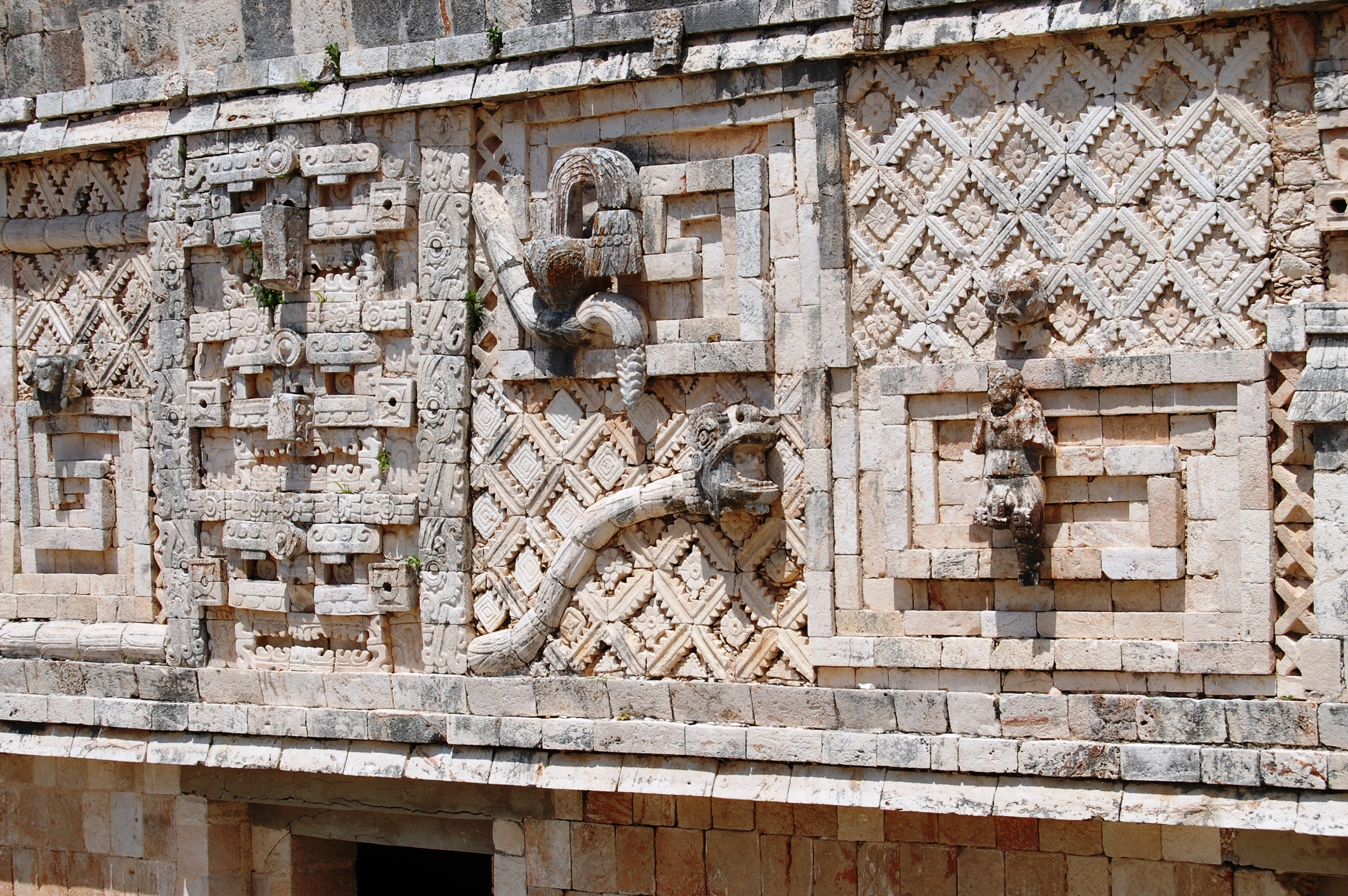
Depiction of a snake and a tick on a wall at Uxmal

In the Yucatec Maya language, ”Kaan” means snake, and ”Peech” means tick. Can Pech was founded by Ah k'iin Peech. Ah Kin or Ah K'iin being a rank of priest.

== History ==
=== Before Can Pech ===
During the Preclassic and Classic period, around the area of Can Pech, important cities and towns were built. They include Becan, Edzná, Dzibilinocac, Alimochei, Jaina, Nadzcaan, Balamkú, Calakmul, Xcalumkín, Kankí, Chunhuhub, Xtampac, and Hochob. Most of these places were part of the Puuc polity.

The Can Pech area around AD 800

In the early 900s, the Toltecs took control over northern Yucatán. After the Toltecs left, the League of Mayapan became the main power in the area in 987.

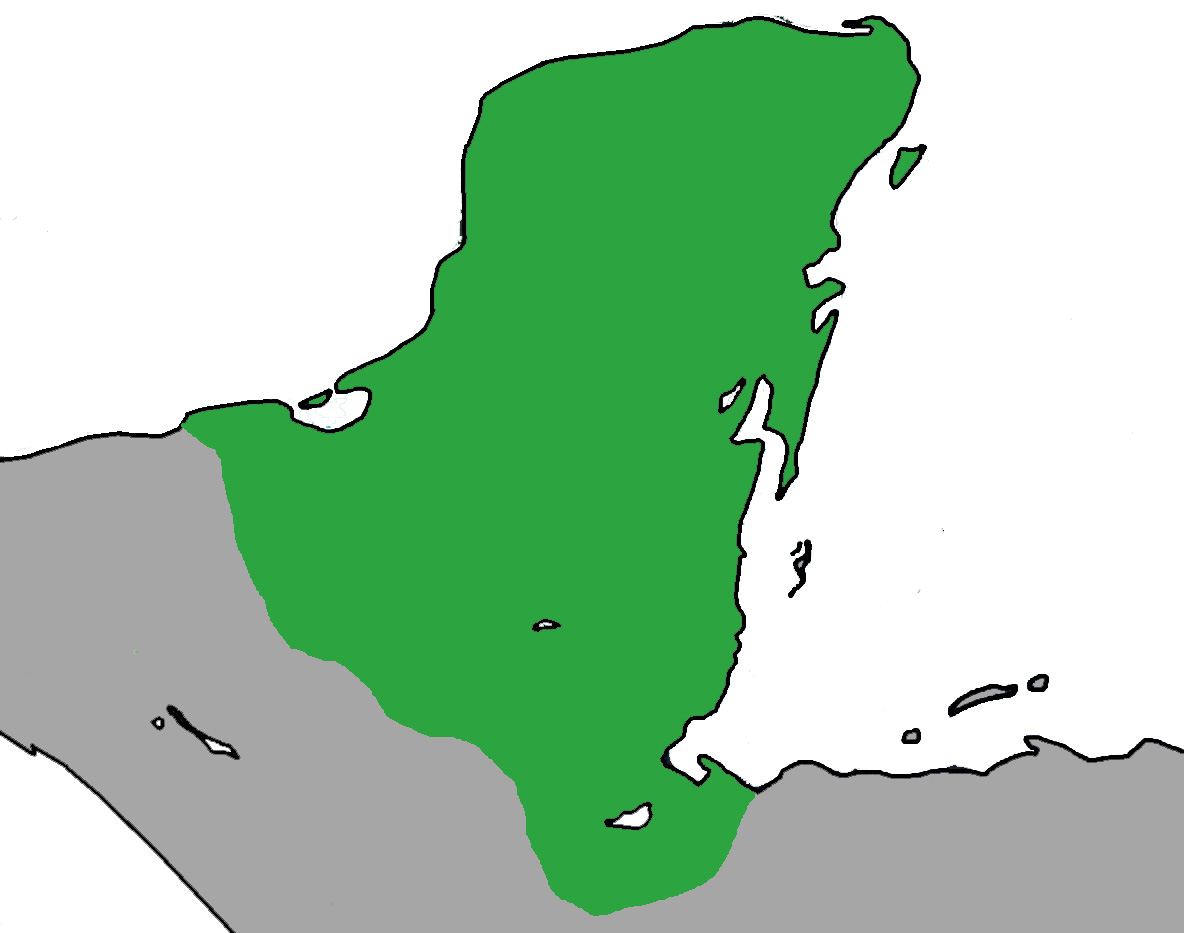
The League in 1200

=== Founding of Can Pech ===
In 1441, a civil war broke out between the Cocom and the Tutul-Xiu. The war was powerful enough that by 1461, the League had completely broken up into several different countries called Kuchkabal. It was during this time that Ah k'iin Peech founded Can Pech.

=== European contact ===
On March 22, 1517, a Spanish ship docked in Campeche city. The Spaniards traded for water with the Maya there.

Missed the water and we had to jump ashore with the people, and was a Sunday of Lazarus, and this cause proceeded to that town name Lazarus, and so is the sea charts, and the proper name of Indian Campeche said ... And was there a good water well, where the natives of that population drank in those lands because, as we have seen there are no rivers, and took the pipes to fill them with water, and turn to the ships. And as they were full and wanted us to ship, came the people work fifty Indians, with good cotton blankets and peace, and what appeared should be caciques, and tell us by signs what we wanted and gave them to understand that water and then go to the ships, and we noted with hands if we came from where the sun rises and said "Castilan", "Castilan" and not look in lecture about "Castilan" - True History of the Conquest of New Spain, Bernal Díaz del Castillo

The Spaniards were taken into the city and given a tour of the palaces and pyramids. They were treated well and they treated the Maya there well. But there was tension after having recently lost a battle with Ekab soldiers.

And being so many other Indians came, they brought very dastardly blankets, buckets full of reeds and put on a plain, and then, after these, came two squadrons of Indian archers, spears and shields, and slings and stones, with their weapons of cotton, and made in concert and each squad captain, which is short distance away from us; and then at that moment went to another house, which was his shrine idols, ten Indians who brought clothes blankets long cotton that gave to their feet, and were white, and very big hair, full of revolt blood with them, they can not even comb desparcir or if not cut; Indians whom were priests of idols, which in New Spain potatoes are commonly called, and thus will name hereafter ... And those potatoes brought incense, as a way of resin called copal among them, and with clay braziers full of coals we began to fumigate, and signs will tell us that we leave their lands before that there are joint wood fire place and burn finished; if not, we will kill war. And then they sent fire to the reeds and the popes were, no more no talk". - "Conquest of Yucatán", Diego Lopez de Cogollado

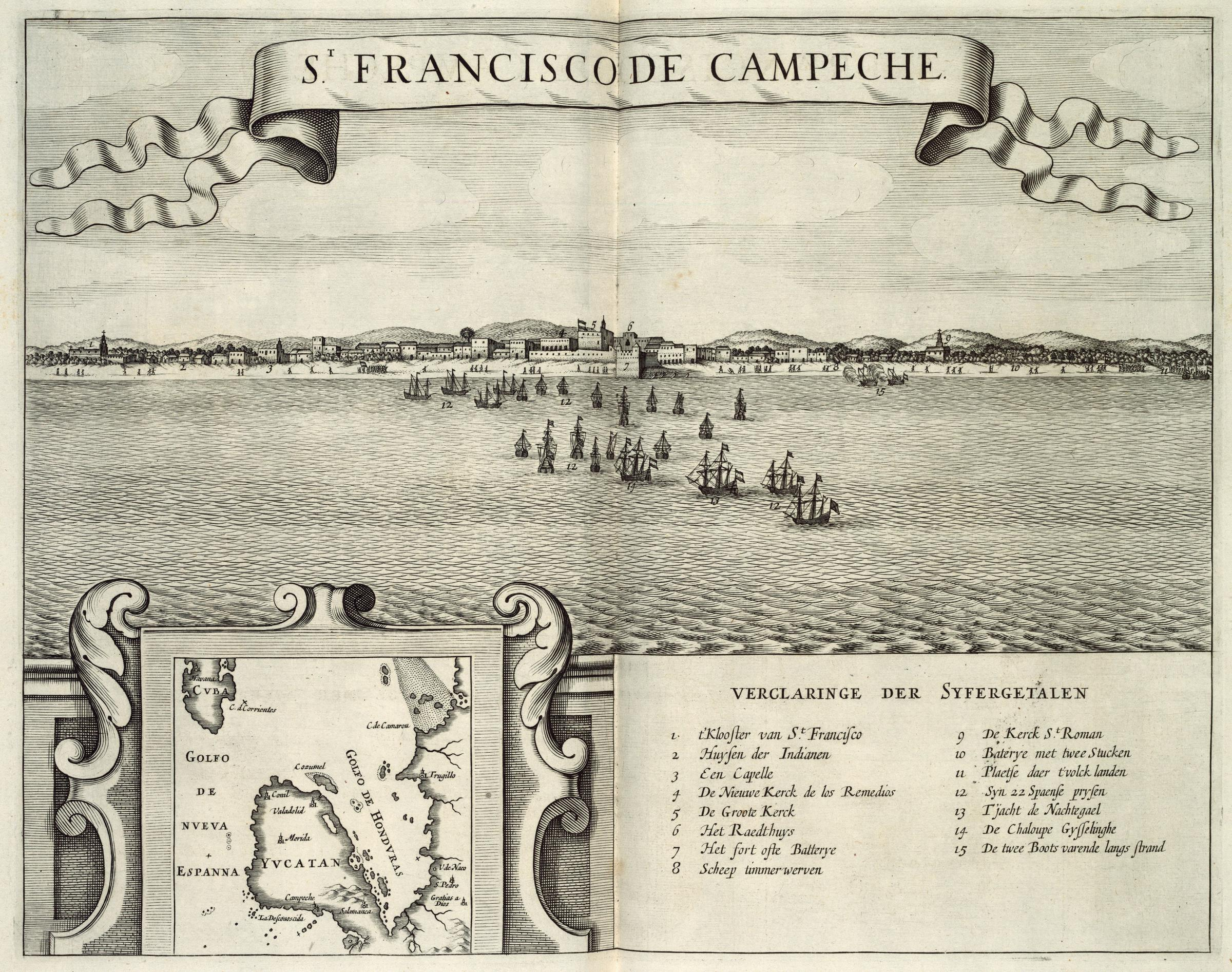
Campeche after the conquest

=== Conquest ===
In 1526, Francisco de Montejo was given permission to conquer Yucatán. In 1527, he invaded. Francisco began in the east and moved west. By 1529, when he reached Cupul, his forces were so beaten that they were forced to retreat back to Spain defeated.

In 1531, the Spaniards invaded again, directly into the city of Campeche. They conquered Can Pech. After the battle, the Spaniards only had ten cavalry and fifty-five foot soldiers left. A reinforcement of 20,000 Maya soldiers was sent to the city and the Spaniards were easily defeated.

In 1540, the third and finale invasion started in Chakan Putum. The Spaniards sent diplomats into Can Pech to convince the Batab (Municipal leaders) to swear allegiance to the crown of Spain. On October 4, The Spaniards invaded Campeche. Betrayed by the Batab, the city was overwhelmed.

== Organization ==
After the war between the Tutul Xiu and Cocom, the Yucatán Peninsula broke up into 16 Kuchkabal. In the present-day state of Campeche, there were Ah Canul, Can Pech, and Chakán Putum. Conflicts between Kuchkabal were common, especially between Tutul Xiu and Cocom.

Normally, each Kuchkabal had a capital where the ruler and supreme priest lived. The ruler was called a Halach Uinik. Each Kuchkabal was divided into several municipalities called "Batabil", which in turn were governed by officials called "Batab", who were usually relatives of the Halach Uinik. Each Batab was the military leader of his population.

On the religious side, after the Halach Uinik, there was the Ah Kin May and the regular priests Ah Kin (meaning "coming from the Sun"). There was also a sacrificial priest called "Ah Nacom".

== Geography ==
Most of Campeche's population lived near the coast. The Puuc hills had been densely populated in the classic Maya period, but were largely abandoned after the Maya collapse.

There may have been as many as 36,000 people in Campeche at the time of the first contact with Spaniards, but by 1540, only 5,985 people were left in the city, largely because of smallpox.

== See also ==
- Maya civilization
- Campeche, Campeche, modern city founded atop Can Pech
- Kuchkabal
