= Ekab =

Mayan chiefdom

Ekab Kuchkabal Ekab
- 1441–1547
- Kuchkabals of Yucatan after 1461.
- Capital: Ekab
- Common languages: Official language: Yucatec
- Religion: Maya religion
- Government: Oligarchy
- Halach Uinik
- Historical era: Medieval / Early Modern
  - Established: 1441
  - Disestablished: 1547
Preceded by	Succeeded by
League of Mayapan	New Spain

Ekab or Ecab was the name of a Mayan chiefdom of the northeastern Yucatán Peninsula, before the arrival of the Spanish conquistadors in the sixteenth century. In the fifteenth century most of Yucatán was controlled by the League of Mayapan. By 1441 there was civil unrest. The provinces of the League rebelled and formed sixteen smaller states. These states were called Kuchkabals. Most Kuchkabals were ruled by a Halach Uinik, but Ekab wasn't. It was divided up into several Batabil. Each Batabil was ruled over by a leader called a Batab. In Ekab the Batabs were supposed to have equal power, but the Batabs on Cozumel had much more power than the others.

== Religious importance ==
The island Cozumel was a Batab of Ekab. Cozumel was an important religious area for the Maya. People traveled to Cozumel from as far away as Nicaragua and Michoacán. The island was sacred to the moon goddess Ix Chel. Most of the pilgrims who traveled there were women. Ix Chel was also patron goddess of childbirth, medicine, and weaving.

== Geography ==
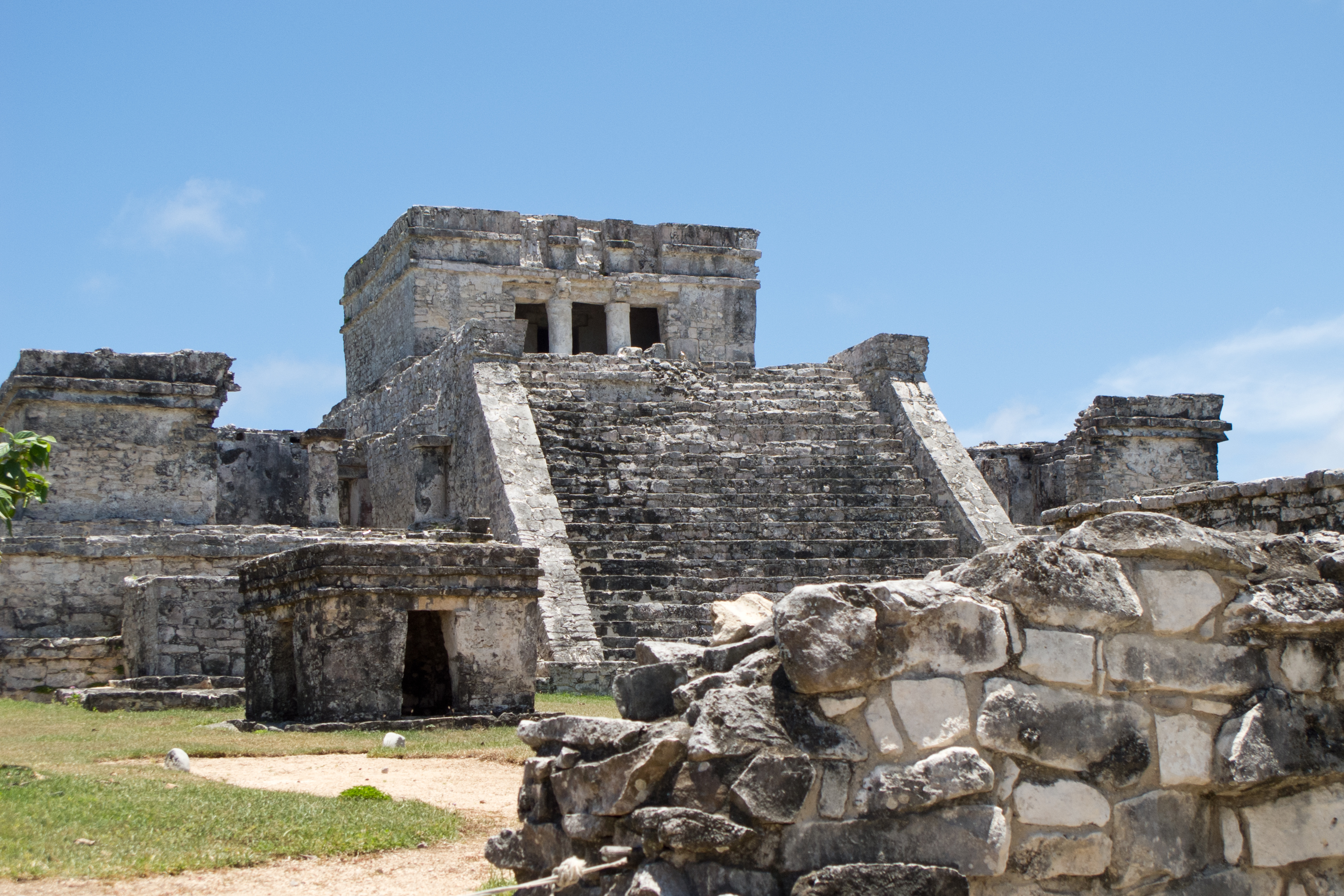
Tulum or Zama was an important port city on the east coast

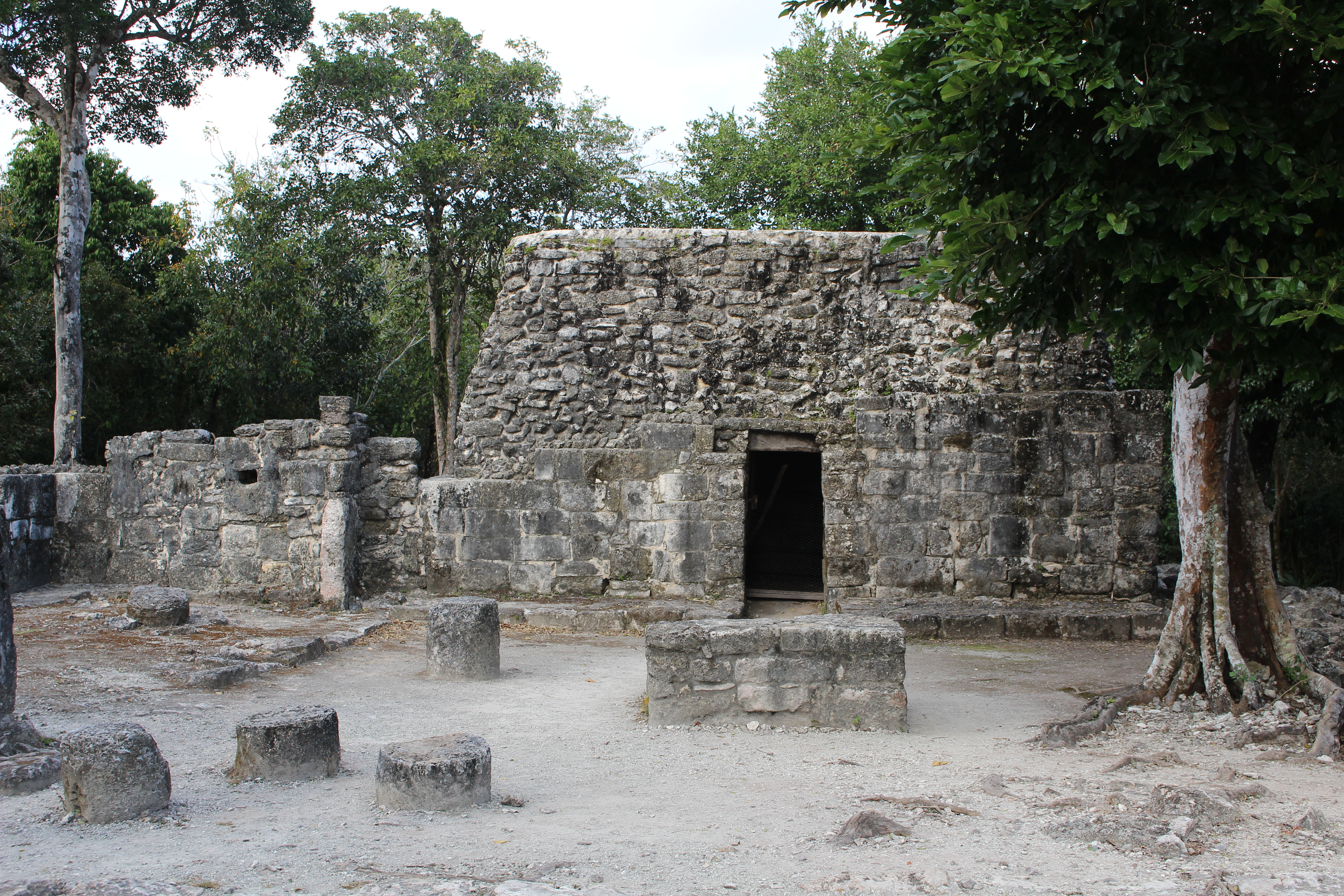
Tantun, now San Gervasio is the largest still existing maya ruin on Cozumel

Ekab was surrounded in the west by Chikinchel, Tazes, Cupul and Cochuah, and in the south Uaymil. There were several port towns along the coast, most notably Tulum, Xcaret, and Xel-Ha. Ekab had a strategic position on the coast, sailors circumnavigated as far away as Tampico and Nicaragua.

== Xaman-Há ==
The archeological site of Xaman-Há ("northern waters") was likely established by the Ekab kingdom.

== European Contact ==
In 1502, on Christopher Columbus's fourth voyage to America, he made contact with an Ekab merchants ship.

In 1511, a Spanish ship was caught in a storm and destroyed. The survivors were taken as slaves by Ekab. Maya slaves were allowed to work their way up. By the time of formal contact with the Spaniards they had wives and children.

In 1517, Francisco Hernández de Córdoba sailed to Isla Mujeres where he found the ruins of a Maya village and an observatory. They continued inland and made contact with the Mayans. They attacked the Mayans, were defeated, but managed to take two prisoners as translators.

Juan de Grijalva visited Cozumel in 1518 and observed Zama and Xel Ha. Hernán Cortés visited Ekab on his way to conquer the Aztecs in 1519.

Between 1527 and 1547 there were three attempts to conquer Yucatán. In the first two the Spaniards were easily defeated, but as smallpox spread through Mesoamerica and the Maya population was decimated. The final conquest was between 1542 and 1547. The conquistadores started in the west and worked their way towards Ekab. Cozumel was the last part of the Ekab to be conquered.

== See also ==
- Montejo expedition – to this chiefdom in 1527
