= Chakán Putum =

Mayan chiefdom of the Yucatán Peninsula

Kuchkabal Chakan Putum
- 1441–1547
- Kuchkabals of Yucatan after 1461.
- Capital: Chakan Putum
- Common languages: Official language: Yucatec
- Religion: Maya religion
- Government: Monarchy
- Halach Uinik
- Historical era: post classic period / Early Modern
  - Established: 1441
  - Disestablished: 1529
Preceded by	Succeeded by
League of Mayapan	New Spain

Chakán Putum was the name of a Mayan chiefdom of the southwestern Yucatán Peninsula, before the arrival of the Spanish conquistadors in the 16th century. Its capital city was a major Mayan port city with some 8000 buildings. The modern city of Champotón, Campeche was constructed at this location.

== Organization ==
After the war between the Tutul-Xiu and the Cocom, the Yucatán Peninsula broke up into approximately 16 kuchkabal. In the present day state of Campeche there was Ah Canul, Can Pech and Chakán Putum. Conflicts between the kuchkabal were common, especially between the Tutul-Xiu and the Cocom.

Each kuchkabal had a capital where the ruler (called a halach uinik) and the supreme priest lived. Each kuchkabal was divided into several municipalities — called batabil — which in turn were governed by officials called batab, who were usually relatives of the halach uinik. Each batab was the military leader of its population. On the religious side were the Ah Kʼin (a Yucatec term for “someone who deals with the day(s)”, that refers to priests). Also there was a sacrificial priest called "Ah Nacom".

== Geographic Description ==
The population of Chakán Putum was found by the shores of the Champotón River, and the territory was named after this people. To the West of Chakán Putum was the Gulf of Mexico, to the Southwest was Tabasco (the territory of the Chontales Mayans), to the North was the Can Pech territory, and to the East of the territory (although there was no definite border) were the cities of Ulumal, Haltunchén and Sihocha. The inhabitants of Chakán Putum and Chactemal were both in the Putún ethnic group, which resulted in frequent migration of settlers between their territories. The Mexicans made no distinction between the territories of Can Pach and Chakán Putum, and renamed the both of them as the province of “Chochistán”. Only 70 kilometers to the Southwest of Chakán Putum was the Chontales Mayan city, Tixchel. Chakán Putum was an important point in the commercial route from the Tabasco cities Cupilco, Potonchán, and Xicalango to the rest of the peninsula and Caribbean Sea.

== Economy ==
The narratives of the Spanish Conquistadors described a city of 8000 houses. They also told of a fishing fleet of more than 2000 canoes which went out to sea each day and arrived at the reef temple to supplicate and thank their gods. The Champotón River was navigable, and was used by the Mayan merchants to gain admission to the interior parts of the territory. After the Spanish conquest of Yucatán, the natives were obligated to pay a tribute of fish. Other mentionable settlements from the time period of the conquest of Chakán Putum were Si Ho Beach, Haltunchen, Sihochac, Kehte, and Teop.

== European contact ==
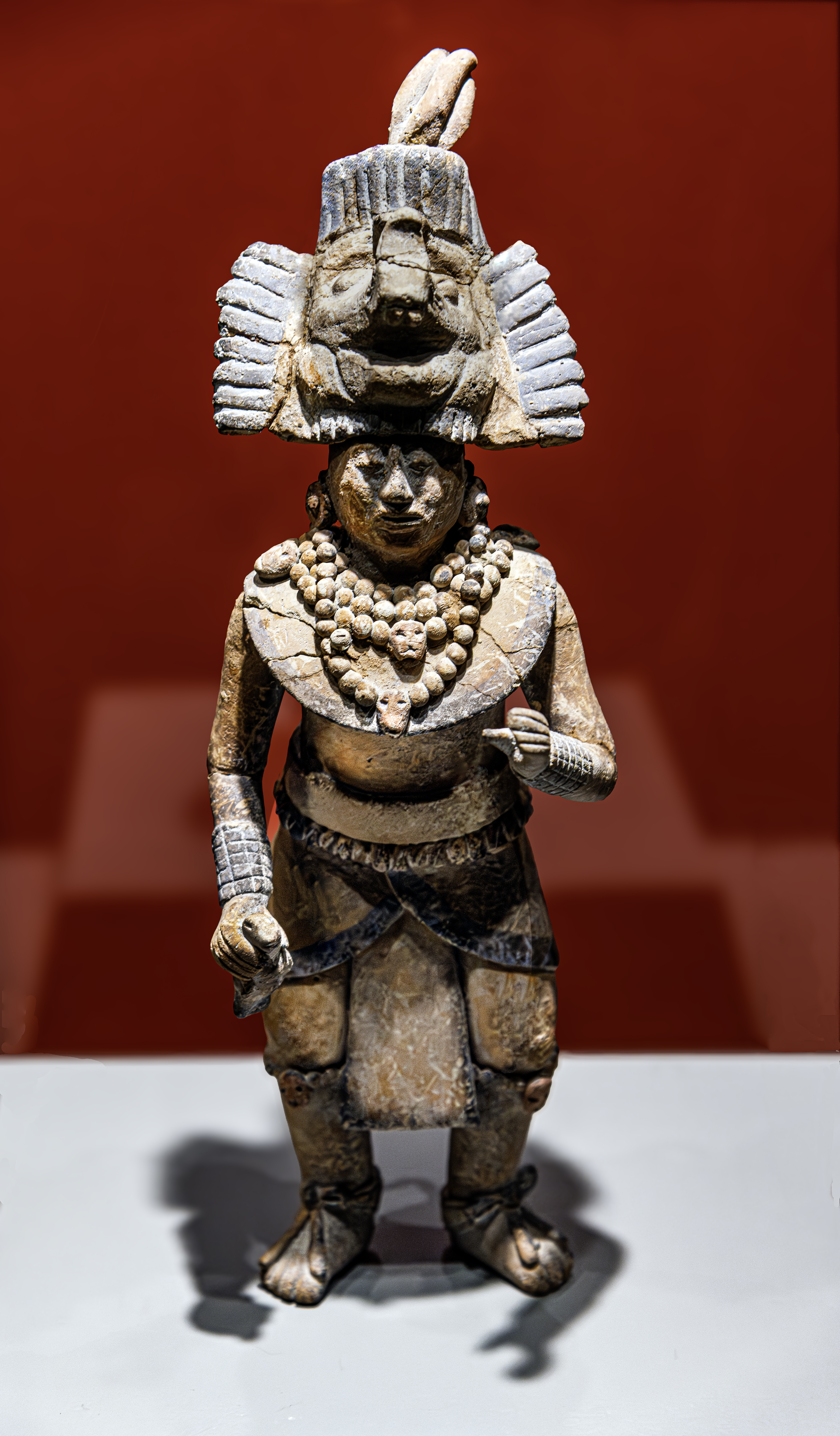
A Maya sculpture from Chakan Putum

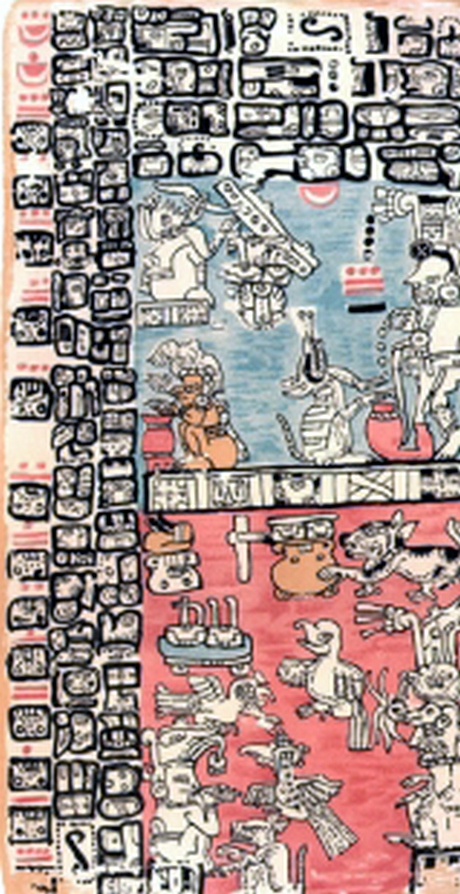
The Madrid codex

In 1517, 1518 and 1519 the Spaniards battled the Maya of Chakan Putum. Chakan Putum had 2,000 war canoes. After the Spaniards allied with neighboring Can Pech and conquered Tabasco they invaded a fourth time between 1527 and 1528.

On March 25, 2021, accompanied by Bolivian President Luis Alberto Arce Catacora, President Andrés Manuel López Obrador (AMLO) paid homage in Champotón, Campeche to 504 years of indigenous resistance to colonialism by the inhabitants of Chakán Putum.
