= Chikinchel =

Mayan chiefdom of the northern coast of Yucatán

Chiefdoms of Yucatán

Chikinchel (Yucatec Maya: Chikinchel de Chinkín) was the name of a Mayan chiefdom of the northern coast of Yucatán, before the arrival of the Spanish conquistadors in the sixteenth century. Chauacá has also been used to refer to this province, but apparently it was the name of the main city.

After the destruction of Mayapan (1441–1461), in the Yucatán Peninsula, it created rivalries among the Maya, and formed 16 separate jurisdictions, called Kuchkabals. In each Kuchkabal there was a Halach Uinik (Yucatec Maya: Halach Uinik), who was the chief with the most political, judicial, and militaristic authority and lived in a principal city considered the capital of the jurisdiction.

== Historical Dates and Territories ==
It bordered the Tases and Cupul in the south, Ah Kin Chel in the west, and Ekab in the east, which separated an area of swamps and, to the north, a large portion of the coast of the Yucatán Peninsula. The area provided an abundance of animals to hunt and salt and salt to mine (it was the leading producer on the peninsula), although unhealthy conditions caused dignitaries to live in remote villages along the coast.

Chikinchel does not appear to have been a united providence. Chauaca fought frequently with local rivals, like Sinsimato and Dzonotaké. However, salt united the inhabitants of the jurisdiction because they prevented outsiders from Ah Kin Chel and the south from going where valuable chloride was produced.

== See also ==
- Montejo expedition – including battle with this chiefdom
