= Manikin scepter =

Mayan token of political power

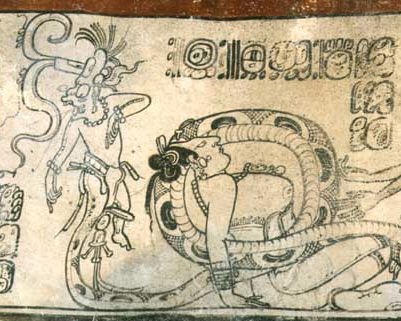
K'awiil

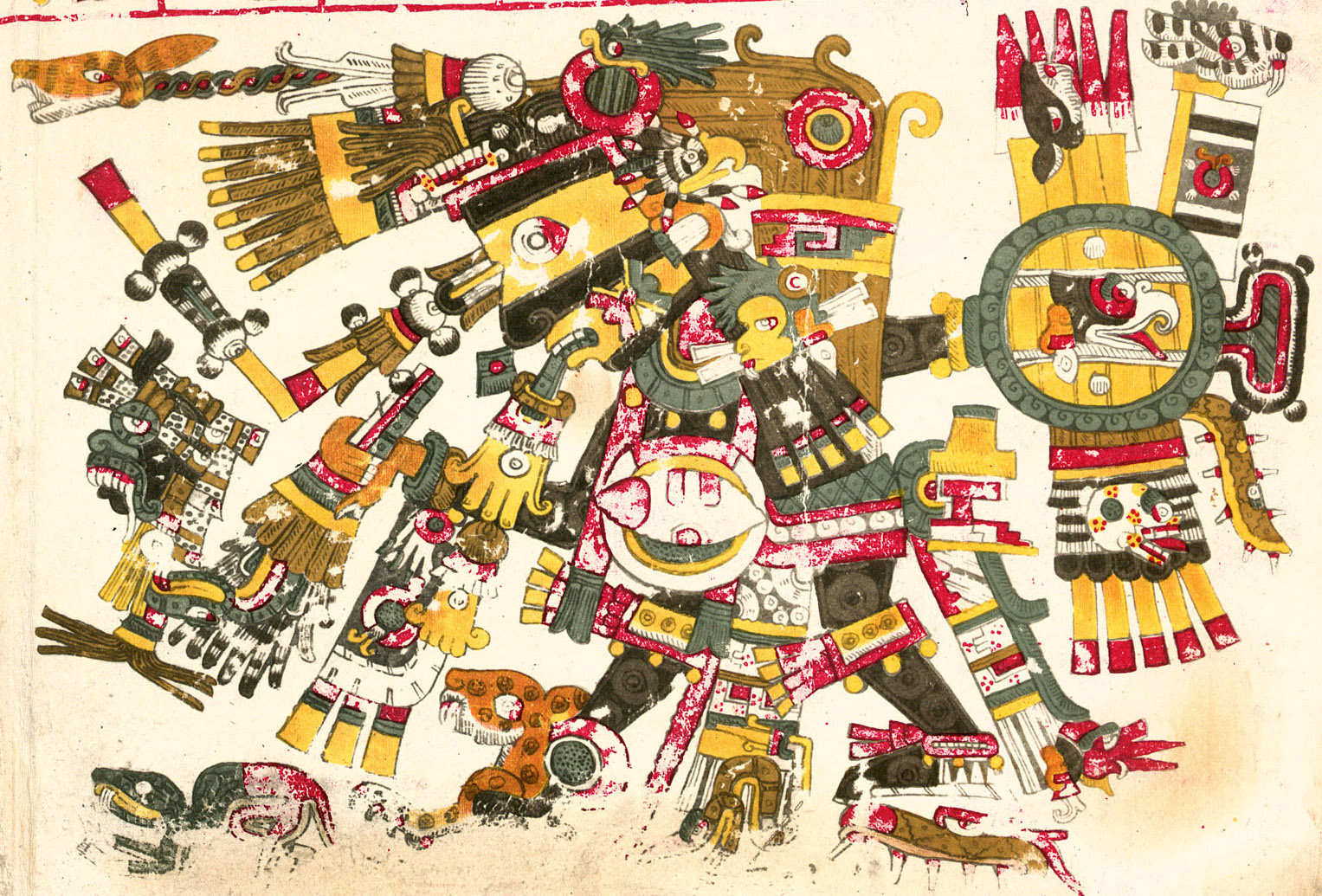
Tezcatlipoca was also on many manikin scepters

Manikin scepters are objects that were held by Maya rulers to signify their power and authority. The term scepter is deceiving, because the object is too short to be held in the hand and touch the ground. Manikin scepters are normally clay or stone with intricate carvings and the face of a god. K'awiil was the most common god to be shown on them. All the manikin scepters held by the Halach Uiniks of the Kuchkabals of Yucatán show K'awiil.
