= Cupul =

Maya chiefdom

Kuchkabal Cupul
- 1441–1543
- Kuchkabals of Yucatan after 1461.
- Capital: Saki
- Common languages: Official language: Yucatec
- Religion: Maya religion
- Government: Monarchy
- Halach Uinik
- Historical era: post classic / Early Modern
  - Established: 1441
  - Disestablished: 1543
Preceded by	Succeeded by
League of Mayapan	New Spain

Cupul or Kupul (Maya: Kupul, 'toponym; adjective') was the name of a Maya chiefdom at time of the Spanish conquest of Yucatán. Cupul was one of the most extensive and densely populated Maya provinces on the Yucatán Peninsula. It was formed in the mid-fifteenth century after the fall of Mayapan and reached its maximum power during the sixteenth century, at the time of their own Spanish conquest led by the adelantado Francisco de Montejo.

== Etymology ==
According to the Encyclopedia Yucatán in time, the name comes from the Maya word ku-pul, meaning that throws the bouncing, referring to the Maya ballplayers that existed in the region.

Ralph Roys instead says that Cupul was named for a lineage, and its name referred to a type of vine called cup in Maya (Calopogonium caeruleum).

== Organization ==
Unlike other kuchkabals, Cupul did not have a halach uinik. Like other kuchkabals, it was divided into several municipalities called "Batalib" which in turn were governed by officials called Batab. The batalib were Panaba, Tsonot, Temozón, Cucumul, Tixcacalcupul, and Uayumhá. It was common for the batalib of Cupul to go to war with one another, sometimes even if they were ruled by the same family. Some batalib went to war with Ah Kin Chel and Chikinchel, but Cupul's relations with Sotuta and Cochuah generally seem to have been more peaceful. The eponymous Cupul lineage was prominent and ruled or were influential in many towns of the province. Other numerous lineages included the Cauich, May, Canul, Noh and Ppol.

On the religious side, after the Halach Uinik was the Ah Kin May and the regular priests Ah Kin (meaning coming from the Sun). There also was a sacrificial priest called "Ah Nacom".

== History ==
=== The League of Mayapan ===
Since the tenth century, The League of Mayapan had been the main power in The Yucatan Peninsula. In 1440 the governor of Cupul known as Ek Balam founded a town of the same name.

=== The end of the League ===
In 1441 the league had a civil war between the Cocom and Tutul Xiues. The rest of the league took advantage of the war, and rebelled. By 1461 The League of Mayapan had been completely disintegrated into seventeen Kuchkabals.
