= Ake =

Maya settlement

Coordinates: 20°57′N 89°18′W

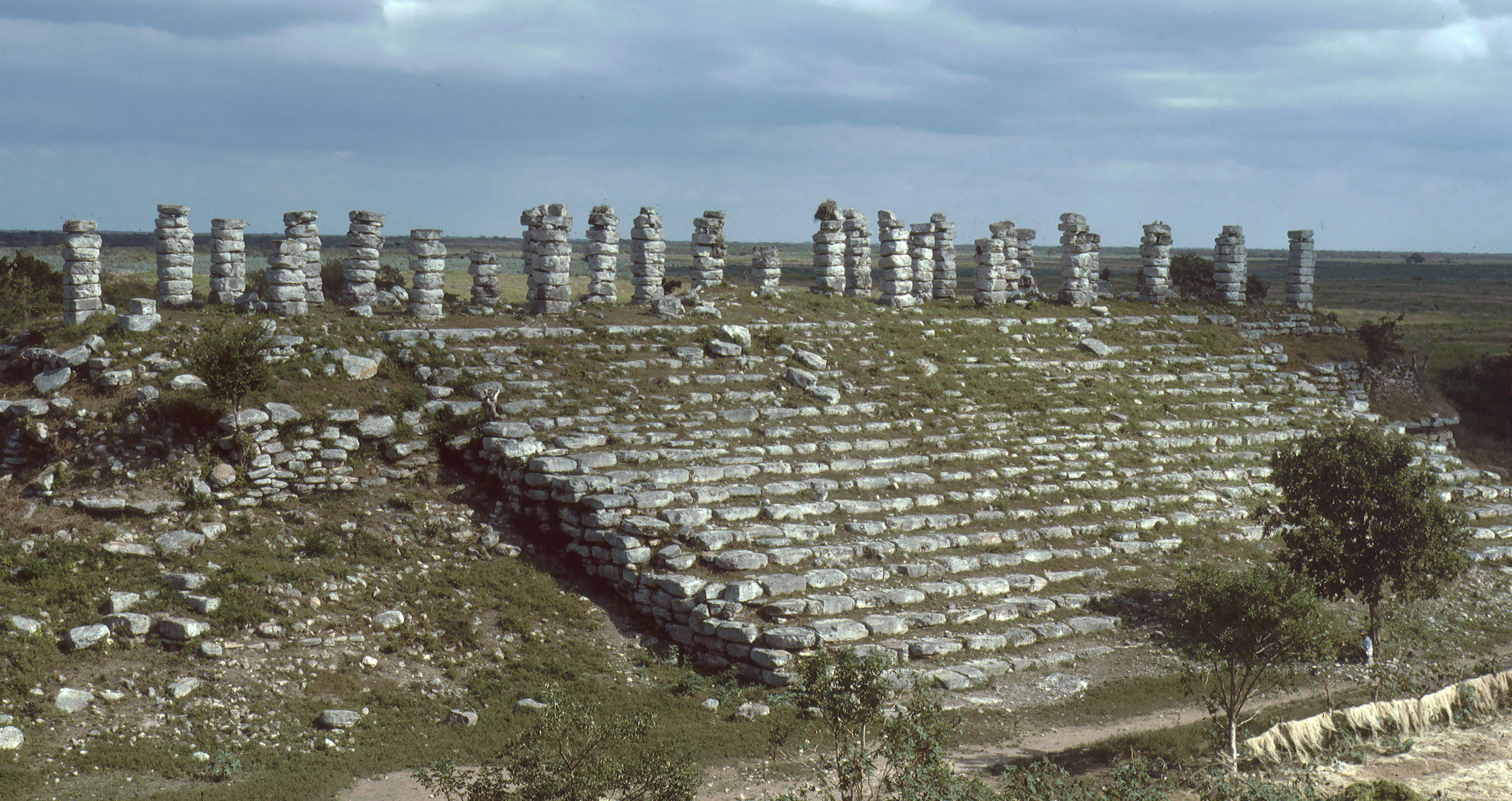
"El Palacio" of Aké

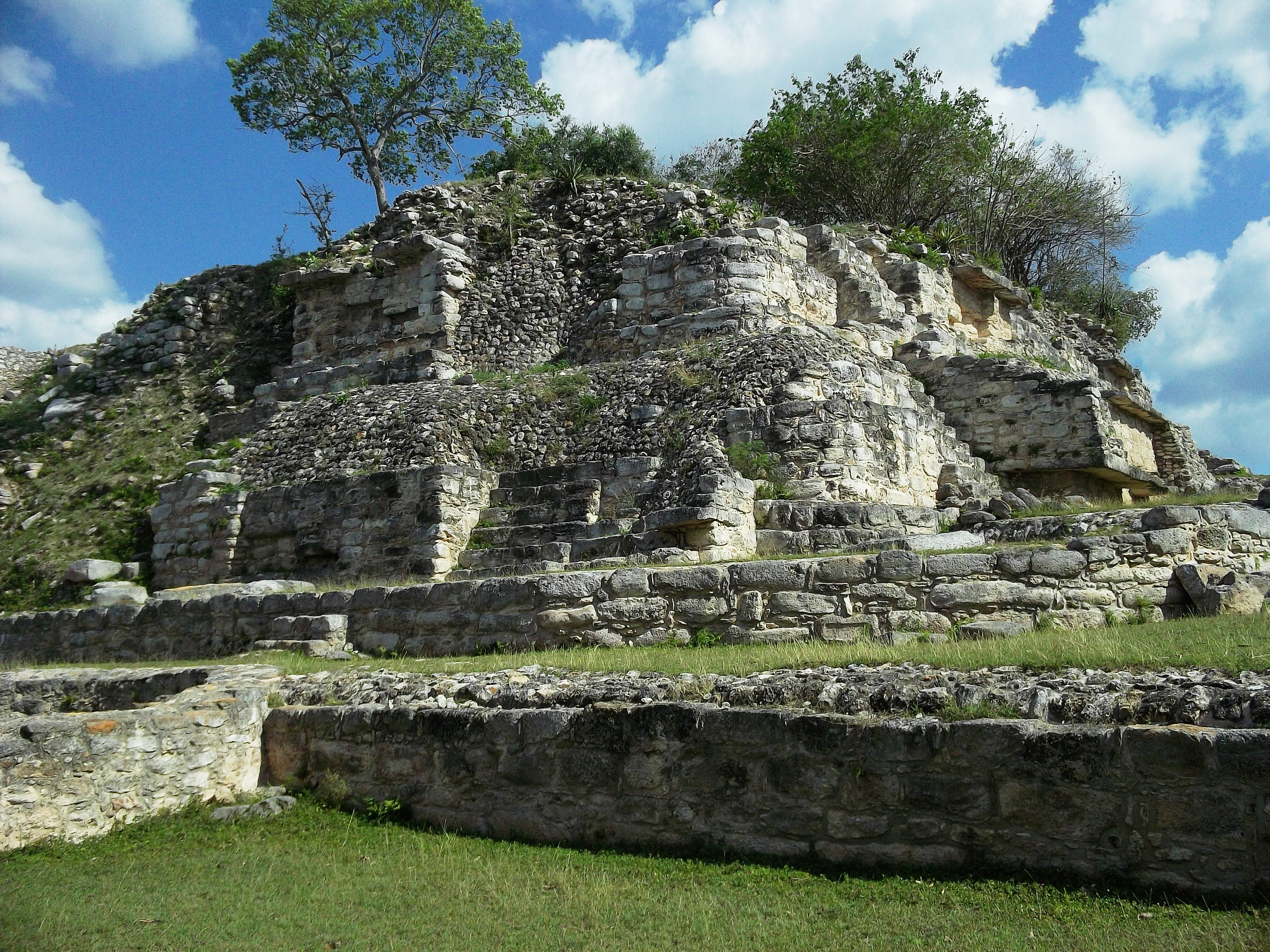
Ruins of Aké

Ake (or Aké in Spanish orthography) is an archaeological site of the pre-Columbian Maya civilization. It is located in the municipality of Tixkokob, in the Mexican state of Yucatán; 40 km (25 mi) east of Mérida, Yucatán.

The name Ake is a toponym that means "place of reeds" in Yucatec Maya. One notable feature of the site is its system of pre-Columbian sacbeo'ob or roads that facilitate access with other settlements in the region.

The architecture dates from the Early Classic era (A.D. 250-550). They were first described in print by John Lloyd Stephens and Frederick Catherwood in the early 1840s.

Aké is bounded by two concentric walls; one defines the core of the settlement with an area of 4 km^{2}, while the other protects the core housing. The core is large and square in shape and is surrounded by tall buildings measuring about 25 m^{2}. Structure One, also called the palace, with rows of stone columns atop a step-pyramid platform is the site's most impressive feature. While most Maya pyramids are built steep with many narrow steps, Structure One is a gradual climb of huge, flat stone slabs. This megalithic architectural style is an Early Classic diagnostic, and may also be seen at the sites of Izamal and Ek Balam. The remains of an ancient Maya raised pedestrian causeway, or sacbe, runs to Aké from Izamal. The ruins are all within a 19th-century Hacienda henequenera.

== See also ==
- Battle of Ake – in 1528
