= Kuchkabal =

Postclassic Maya social and political organisation

Coordinates: 18.9467°N 89.4145°W

The kuchkabalo'ob of Yucatán after The League of Mayapan / borders closely resemble those of the provinces that were there before / 2009 map / via Wikimedia Commons

A kuchkabal (Mayan pronunciation: [ˈkutʃ.ka.bal], plural: kuchkabalo'ob, literal translation: 'province,' 'state,' 'polity') was a system of social and political organisation common to Maya polities of the Yucatán Peninsula, in the Maya Lowlands, during the Mesoamerican Postclassic. There were somewhere between 16 and 24 such provinces just prior to the Spanish conquest of Yucatán. (Note: The Yucatecan Mayan orthography in this article follows that of Barrera Vásquez et al. 1980, pp. 41a–44a. At least two other orthographic systems exist (Lehmann 2018, sec. 2.1, 3), neither of which is used in this article. Accordingly, batab, batabil, halach winik, and kuchkabal are preferred over several variations thereof, per Barrera Vásquez et al. 1980, pp. 39–40, 175, 344.) (Note: The term kuchkabal may be also be used to denote certain settlements, families, or houses. Further see § Glossary.)

== Extent ==
The kuchkabalo'ob, 'provinces,' were located in the Yucatán Peninsula of the Maya Lowlands, bounded by a northwest-to-southeast trending crescent, stretching along the base of the Peninsula, from the Bay of Campeche to the Bay of Honduras. To the west, the provinces bordered settlements of Chontal, Nahuatl, and Zoque speakers in eastern Tabasco, eastern Chiapas, and western Campeche (beyond Laguna de Terminos). (Note: That is, in the 'alluvial plain extending roughly from what is now Laguna Tupilco to Tenosique on the Usumacinta River[,] and lying between the Gulf of Mexico and the base of the Chiapas mountain range' (Roys 1943, p. 98). The territory was inhabited predominantly by Chontal speakers, and to a lesser extent by Nahuatl (in 'eight towns south and southeast of the Chontalpa and at Xicalango near Laguna de Terminos') and Zoque speakers (in 'six towns near the base of the [Chiapas] sierra') (Roys 1943, p. 99).) To the southwest and south, they bordered settlements of Chol speakers in western Peten, northern Alta Verapaz, northern Izabal, northern Copan, northern Santa Barbara, and western Cortes (before the Ulua River). (Note: That is, in the '[territory e]ast of the Zoque towns of Tabasco [ie six towns near the base of the Chiapas sierra] and also bordering on the alluvial plain occupied by the Chontal [... and the adjacent territory encompassed by] a belt of land extending [from Tabasco] to the southeast and east as far as the southern shore of the Gulf of Honduras' (Roys 1943, pp. 99, 110–111). The territory near Tabasco was inhabited predominantly by speakers of extant Chiapan varieties of Chol, while that extending southeast and east was inhabited by speakers of extinct Lacandonan, Acalan, Manchean, and Toqueguan varieties of Chol (Roys 1943, pp. 110–111).) The provinces thereby encompassed all six districts of Belize, the Guatemalan department of Peten, and the Mexican states of Campeche, Quintana Roo, and Yucatán.

Some recent scholarship, employing a revised understanding of the provinces, has proposed to situate the latter only within those portions of the Peninsula predominated by Yucatecan Mayan speakers. (Note: While politically fractured, the cuchcabal [kuchkabal]-ruled Maya were more-or-less a single unit in the broadest economic and cultural senses. The same language—Yucatec Mayan—was spoken in across the entire region, regular trade occurred across cuchcabalo'ob [kuchkabalo'ob], and basic sociopolitical organizing principles and hierarchies were similar from place to place. — Geoffrey H. Wallace in Wallace 2020, p. 97, citing Quezada 2014, p. 16.) Consequently, the limits of the provinces' territory have been proposed as a northwest-to-southeast trending diagonal, from Champoton to the Belize River, resulting in an expanse covering only the aforementioned Mexican states, and the Belizean districts of Corozal, Orange Walk, and Belize.

== History ==
=== Emergence ===
Current knowledge of the historical antecedents of the provinces 'is fragmentary and extremely vague for the period prior to the middle of the fifteenth century.' (Note: Okoshi et al. 2021, p. 7 note that '[t]he advent of the Early Postclassic era is not fully understood and has been referred to as a "dark age",' characterising the Early Postclassic as the AD 950–1250 era when '[n]ew political regimes [other than city-states ruled by divine kings] took shape.' The same further assert that Uxmal and Chichen Itza 'had emerged in the north[ern Lowlands]' as 'capitals' by AD 860–920 (prior to the Early Postclassic), despite the coincident collapse of central and southern Lowland city-states.) Nonetheless, some post-conquest Maya accounts claim 'Chichen Itza had formerly governed the entire country [Peninsula] for about 200 years,' while other such accounts rather claim 'that Uxmal, Chichen Itza, and Mayapan ruled the area during this length of time,' and furthermore, some such accounts claim that Mayapan ruled the Peninsula during a later period. The former claim has been described as 'more or less true of most of northern Yucatán [Peninsula],' while the last claim has been deemed partially accurate, as there is 'some evidence that northern Yucatán from the Gulf of Mexico east to Cupul was, for a time at least, subject to a joint government located at [Mayapan, though] it is doubtful that its hegemony included Campeche and Champoton [and, further,] it appears possible that it did not extend to the east coast of the peninsula.' (Note: Similarly, Andrews 1984, p. 589 notes – The antiquity of the kuchkabalo'ob eludes us. Their configuration at the time of the conquest clearly extends back in time to the collapse of the League of Mayapan, in the mid-fifteenth century. The League of Mayapan (ca. A.D. 1250-1441) was made up of a "joint government" (multepal) of several of the provinces in the western region of the peninsula, and did not include many of the kuchkabalo'ob to the east and south, which were undoubtedly autonomous polities during the Late Postclassic period (ca. A.D. 1200-1542). Thus there is good reason to believe many of the provinces existed before the founding of Mayapan, in the mid-twelfth [sic] century. They may have evolved out of earlier polities of the Classic period. Braswell 2022, p. 184 seems to agree with the last conjecture, stating, the 'political system [of Lowland Classic city-states governed by divine sovereigns] began to collapse in the late eighth century AD and eventually disappeared in the late ninth century, only to be replaced by new forms of government during the Postclassic period,' and further citing (generally) Demarest, Rice & Rice 2004 and Iannone 2014.) In case such a centralised government existed at Mayapan, its rule would have been disrupted upon the city's destruction 'about a century before the final Spanish conquest.' (Note: Roys 1943, pp. 12, 58 notes that Mayapan's destruction may have prompted the establishment of at least some provinces (eg Ah Canul, Ah Kin Chel, Sotuta, and Mani), and furthermore, that at least some of them may have pre-dated said event (eg Chakan, Ceh Pech). Andrews 1984, p. 589 notes that 'there is good reason to believe that many of the provinces existed before the founding of Mayapan, in the mid-twelfth century[; t]hey may have evolved out of earlier polities of the Classic period.') It has been further suggested that Nahuatl- or Chontal-speaking settlers, who appear to have come predominantly from Tabasco, may have influenced the constitutions of emerging provinces.

=== Fall ===
Hispano-Maya hostilities first broke out in Ecab, capital of the eponymous province in Cape Catoche, in 1517. The Spanish conquest, however, did not properly start until 1527, and was 'an arduous enterprise lasting twenty years.' (Note: Though 'Tayasal defended its independence up to the late seventeenth century' (Bührer et al. 2017, p. 42).)

== Constitution ==
=== Types ===
Many of the provinces were organised as unitary states, governed by a single halach winik, 'governor.' However, some were rather organised as a confederacy of batabilo'ob, 'towns,' 'more or less closely knit,' and governed (jointly or severally) by the respective batabo'ob, 'mayors.' And further still, some 'seem to have been merely collections of towns in a given area, whose relations with one another are largely a matter of conjecture.' (Note: For instance, Okoshi et al. 2021, p. 296 note that 'at least one province, Copul, does not seem to have been unified [as a confederacy of towns], instead being noted [in Hispano-Maya records] as composed of an independent group of towns,' citing for this Roys 1943, p. 62.) Thus, broadly, provinces were organised either as unitary or federal states, with varying degrees of cohesion.

=== Divisions ===
The provinces were first subdivided into constituent towns. Larger towns were further subdivided into kuchteelo'ob, 'wards,' though 'little' is known about these second-order units. (Note: For instance, the towns of Tekax and Ppencuyut are known to have been so subdivided (Roys 1943, p. 20).) Consequently, the civil service of all provinces featured offices for first-order subdivisions (the province's towns), while that of at least some provinces further featured offices for zeroth-order (the province itself) or second-order (a town's wards) subdivisions.

=== Offices ===
==== Civil ====
The halach winik, 'governor,' present only in unitary provinces, exercised sovereign legislative, executive, judicial, military, and religious authority over the same. Their government is thought to have been invariably based in the capital. Notably, the office was responsible for military defence, foreign policy, home policy (effected via the provincial mayors), serious or inter-municipal civil and criminal court cases, and certain religious ceremonies. Particular attention is thought to have been paid to the maintenance of the territorial integrity of the province, and that of its constituent towns. For instance, in 1545, Nachi Cocom, colonial governor of Sotuta, is known to have 'personally made a survey of his entire frontier and conferred with various Cochua and Cupul [mayors] who lived close to his borders, evidently discussing local differences of opinion in regard to the frontiers.' Similarly, in 1557, Kukum Xiu (also known as Francisco the Montejo Xiu), colonial governor of Mani, held a conference at Mani (city) for his and neighbouring mayors to determine the limits of the province and its constituent towns.

The office, at least in some unitary provinces, is known to have been the prerogative of the leading noble house, with tenure held for life, and passed from father to first-born son. (Note: Or, in case the eldest son was not of age, a brother (or other 'capable person [...], probably a relative of the same patronymic [group]') succeeded in office, held it for life, and subsequently passed it to their predecessor's eldest son (Roys 1943, p. 60). This system of succession has been likened to that of 'the Chontal of Itzamkanac and in the Valley of Mexico' (Roys 1943, p. 60).) The officeholder is thought to have been entitled to an allotment of slaves, annual tribute from each town and household (typically produce or other merchantable goods), and court fees when acting as chief justice. (Note: For instance, 'the small town of Tahdziu paid the Xiu ruler [governor] twenty loads of maize each year, and every household in the province contributed one turkey hen' (Roys 1943, p. 61). Peculiarly, a report from Mani describes the annual tribute as 'almost voluntary and only in acknowledgement of the Xiu lordship [governorship],' but a contradictory report 'from the same area [states] that anyone who did not pay tribute was sacrificed' (Roys 1943, p. 61).) Said remuneration is thought to have been 'sufficient [...] to live in considerable state.' (Note: For instance, when the governor of Tutul Xiu met Montejo in Merida in 1542, 'he was carried in a litter and accompanied by an imposing retinue' (Roys 1943, p. 61).) The officeholder is, additionally, thought to have acted as mayor of the provincial capital, and been entitled to that office's remuneration.

The governor does not seem to have had a dedicated advisory council, though it has been suggested that either senior officers of the capital, or some of the provincial mayors (especially those related to the governor), may have or likely acted as privy counsellors, being 'consulted on provincial affairs.'

The batab, 'mayor,' present in all provinces, exercised executive, judicial, and military authority over a batabil, 'settlement.' Notably, the office was responsible for military defence, the building code, farming regulations, non-serious or intra-municipal civil and criminal court cases, and for executing provincial home policy. However, the office's authority is thought to have varied across provinces.

In unitary provinces, relatives of the governor are thought to have enjoyed precedence for mayoral office, as the governor held the power of appointment to said office in such provinces. (Note: Though Okoshi et al. 2021, p. 296 assert that '[at least some towns in unitary provinces] could appoint a batab [mayor] to answer to the halach uinic [governor].') Additionally, suitable first-born sons of an outgoing mayor are similarly thought to have enjoyed precedence for office. (Note: This precedence, however, was not enjoyed in Ceh Pech nor Mani (Roys 1943, p. 62).) In federal provinces, the mayoral office's rules of succession are thought to have been similar to those for the office of governor in unitary provinces. The officeholder is thought to have been entitled to annual tribute from each household (in federal provinces) or to a farm and to miscellaneous farming-and-household services (in unitary provinces), and court fees when acting as magistrate (in all provinces). (Note: That is, in unitary provinces, the townsfolk were 'obligated only to cultivate a field for [the mayor], garner the crop, build and repair his house, and perhaps supply him with domestic service' (Roys 1943, p. 62). Peculiarly, at least in Cupul, some mayors are known to have 'exacted tribute of considerable value' from neighbouring towns' (Roys 1943, p. 63).) Furthermore, the officeholder is thought to have been 'treated with great ceremony and attended by many people' both at home and abroad. For instance, it is thought to have been customary, during lay celebrations, for the town's residents to attend to the mayor, 'bowing before him [the mayor], opening a lane for him to pass, [...] spreading their mantles in front of him [and] protect[ing] his head from the sun with great fans of bright feathers.'

The mayor does seem to have had a dedicated advisory council, namely, the town council, composed of local aldermen or councillors. He is believed to have further employed or relied upon a number of local civil servants or officeholders.

The ah kuch kab, 'alderman or councillor,' present in all provinces, was a member of the town council who reviewed mayoral instructions or decisions for either assent or dissent, with the former thought constitutionally necessary for the execution of any such. In federal provinces, the council are thought to have constituted 'the chief check' on mayoral authority. In larger towns which were further subdivided into wards, each such ward was assigned to an alderman, who was further tasked with taxation and 'other municipal affairs' within said ward. In at least some provinces, officeholders were appointed by the mayor, and tended to be 'rich and capable' men. (Note: These (the batabs [mayors]) divided the town into its wards like the districts of a parish (colaciones) and appointed a rich and capable man to take charge of each. It was their duty to attend to the tribute and services (communal labour?) at the proper time and to assemble the people of their wards for banquets and festivals as well as for war. — Informant from Ceh Pech, via Roys 1943, p. 63.) (Note: The division of towns into wards is known in, at least, Chichen Itza and Mayapan, which 'had been [before the fifteenth century] divided into four main quarters like the Acalan capital at Itzamkanac and as in the highlands of Mexico' (Roys 1943, p. 63). Relatedly, all provincial towns are thought to have 'had four ceremonial entrances at the cardinal points marked by a stone mound on either side, and a [paved] road [which] led from each of these to the [town's] centre, where the more important inhabitants resided' (Roys 1943, pp. 17, 20).)

The ah kulel, 'deputy or delegate,' present in all provinces, was a local civil servant who assisted and deputised for the mayor and council, in both official and private capacities, by attending to the mayor at their personal residence, conveying official instructions to town residents, and acting as advocates or prosecutors in magistrate's court. The office is known to have 'definitely ranked below' that of an alderman or councillor, but above that of bailiffs or constables.

The ah hol pop, 'chamberlain or steward,' present in at least Hocaba and Sotuta, is thought to have been responsible for the popol na, 'town hall,', where residents 'assemble[d] to discuss public business and [to] learn to dance for the town festivals,' and which is thought to have housed the town's pop, 'ceremonial rug,' which served as 'a symbol of authority.' Notably, in at least some towns, the chamberlain or steward is known to have discharged the office of mayor.

The tupil, 'bailiff or constable,' present in at least some provinces, is thought to have exercised law enforcement authority, similar to that of a Spanish alguacil or 'minor peace officer.' The bailiffs are known to have been the lowest-ranked civil servants, with the office described as '[e]vidently [...] not a position filled by members of the nobility.' At least some officeholders are known to have rendered menial service to senior civil servants, for instance, by serving as provision carriers during trips by the governor, or by maintaining the town's grain stores.

==== Military ====
The nakom, 'non-commissioned officer or captain,' present in at least some provinces, were 'special' war officers, thought to have held joint (with the mayor) command of the town's troops during times of war. (Note: The term nakom may also refer to '[a] priest who performed human sacrifices' (Roys 1943, p. 79).) Officeholders were 'installed in office with great ceremony,' held tenure for three years, and maintained a demanding social and dietary regimen. For instance, while in office, the captain was required to '[eat] no meat but the flesh of fish and inguanas, [...] never [be] intoxicated, remai[n] continent, and [have] little intercourse with his fellow townsmen.' Officeholders are thought to have 'probably had much influence in declaring war, for persons who had suffered injury away from home came to him to complain and seek revenge.' Notably, Nacahun Noh, a captain of Saci, is known to have 'received gifts of shell beads from people living as far away as Tizimin who wished to conciliate him and avoid war with his town.'

The holkan, 'enlisted ranksman or specialist,' present in at least some provinces, is thought to have been a wartime office responding to the municipal troop's joint commanding officers, the mayor and captain. The specialists were selected from among the troops for extraordinary military merit by the captain, and were remunerated only during wartime, partly from the captain's personal funds, and partly from municipal funds. They were additionally entitled to spoils of war, and to 'a certain licence,' for a period upon their return from a campaign, to service and entertainment from the town's residents, often to the latter's 'annoyance.'

==== Clerical ====
It has been suggested that ah k'ino'ob, 'priests,' 'should probably also be considered members of the town government.' For instance, the prophecies or interpretations of the ah chila'no'ob, 'prophetic or divinatory priests,' were routinely used to determine matters of state and economics, are further deemed to have 'evidently [been] an important factor in the reception accorded to the Spaniards in the various [provinces].' (Note: For instance, Spaniards were well-received in Mani, whose divinatory priest 'had, years before, prophesied the coming of strangers from the east, who should be welcomed and not opposed,' whereas they were ill-received in Cupul and Cochuah, whose 'chilans [divinatory priests] are said to have been the chief "agitators and rebels" ' (Roys 1943, p. 79).) Furthermore, in colonial times, when the Franciscans, Inquisition, and Provisorato de Indios, had 'more or less broken down' the pre-Columbian priesthood, caciques (i.e. mayors) and 'other important men' are known to have assumed the duties of divination or prophecy. Similarly, all priests are thought to 'have had more authority than the temporal rulers' when enforcing religious observances or punishing religious delinquency.

Hispano-Maya records do not provide evidence of centralised ecclesiastic organisation in any of the provinces. Nonetheless, it has been suggested that, 'most probabl[y, ...] something of the sort existed.' Particularly, in unitary provinces, it is thought that the governor may have assumed the office of ahaw kan, 'archbishop or bishop,' at least in Mayapan, where the former undertook the examination of candidates for priesthood, and the appointment and investiture of priests for the province's towns. In federal provinces, ecclesiastic affairs 'may have been purely a local matter.'

The clergy do not seem to have been entitled to tithes. Rather, they are thought to have been compensated by voluntary offerings (of provisions, currency, or miscellaneous goods), or by regular fees for religious services.

==== Table ====
Select civil, military, and clerical offices of Postclassic Maya provinces in the Yucatán Peninsula. (Note: This table summarises content provided in the preceding sections. For brevity, citations are not herein repeated. Further see § Glossary.)
Office	Gloss	Type	Rank	Notes
halach winik	governor, commander-in-chief	civil, military	most senior	in unitary provinces: is sovereign; may be member of supra-provincial multepal, 'council of governors;' in federal provinces: does not exist.
batab	mayor, commanding officer	civil, military	senior	in unitary provinces: – in federal provinces: is member of provincial council of mayors.
kuch kab	councillor	civil	senior	in all provinces: may be alderman; is member of sub-provincial local council.
nakom	captain	military	senior	in some provinces: may not exist.
chila'n	prophesier	clerical	senior	in all provinces: –
nakom	sacrificer	clerical	senior	in all provinces: –
k'in	priest	clerical	senior	in all provinces: –
kulel	deputy	civil	junior	in all provinces: –
hol pop	chaimberlain	civil	junior	in some provinces: may not exist.
holkan	specialist	military	junior	in some provinces: may not exist.
tupil	bailiff	civil	most junior	in some provinces: may not exist.

=== Authority ===
==== Judicial ====
The provinces are thought to have only held courts of original jurisdiction, with all judgments deemed final and thus not subject to appeal. The mayors held original civil and criminal jurisdiction for non-'serious' or intra-municipal claims, while the governor held such jurisdiction for 'serious' or inter-municipal ones. Judicial proceedings were presided over and decided by the mayor or governor, with local deputies serving as advocates for the claimants, and further officers serving various court roles. Notably, court proceedings seem to have included only oral arguments, judgments seem to have been final in all cases, and oaths for sworn testimony seem to have 'consisted in calling down misfortunes on one's own head if a [given] statement were false.' Civil claims were brought 'for injuries committed without malice,' including, for instance, manslaughter, negligence, and 'the provocation by a husband or wife resulting in the suicide of the other spouse.' At least for cases of manslaughter, if court-awarded compensation were not settled, it seems that the claimant's family were authorised to summarily execute the defaulting defendant by ambush, though this is thought to have been rarely necessary. Criminal cases were brought for, among other crimes, murder, arson, adultery, and theft. Criminal sentences are thought to have included primarily death or enslavement, as milder sentences (e.g. flogging or imprisonment) do not seem to have been commonly employed. Nonetheless, leniency might be shown to youth, women, and members of the upper classes. (Note: For instance, the common sentence for murder was death, but 'a youth who killed an older man might be enslaved,' while a 'wealthy or powerful man [convicted of murder] sometimes was allowed to give a slave or make other reparation' (Roys 1943, p. 32). Similarly, the common sentence for male adulterers was death, but 'the disgrace was considered sufficient chastisement for the woman [female adulterer]' (Roys 1943, p. 32).) Court fees, consisting of 'customary gifts,' were paid by litigants and petitioners to the presiding justice.

==== Military ====
The provinces are thought to have been 'constantly at war with one another,' success in war being a principal source of the nobility's claim to authority, and of the economy's enslaved labour. The governor led the provincial troops as commander-in-chief. (Note: However, wars between towns of the same province are known in Cupul (Roys 1943, p. 68).) These were organised according to their town of origin, with the corresponding mayor and captain as joint commanding officers, and the specialists as special forces. Wars are thought to have typically been short battles, waged during daytime in the wet season (specifically, between October and January, 'when there was little or no agricultural activity'), and to have typically occurred on inter-provincial causeways.

War parties, led by the mayor and captain, often 'set out quietly, hoping for a surprise attack.' Parties were preceded by scouts, who 'blew whistles and conch shells, beat their wooden drums, and pounded large tortoise shells with deerhorn sticks' upon locating the enemy. Hand-to-hand combat ensued, to the tune of 'war cries and loud insults [...] often of an obscene character.' The battle's primary aim was usually the enemy's captivity, with prisoners being 'bound to a wooden collar or yoke, to which a longer rope was attached,' and thereby lead to their captors' townsmen. Additionally, if the mayor or captain were slain in battle, the losing side would 'sl[i]ng their shields on their backs and retrea[t],' with the winning side's soldier responsible for the death being 'especially honoured' for their feat.

As surprise assaults were common, a town's defences typically included seasonal sentinels stationed at various border sites. Furthermore, as parties typically advanced along causeways, these were barricaded 'at strategic points [by semicircular, camouflaged] walls of dry stone and palisades of heavy timbers bound together by lianas, [with built-in defensive posts] from which arrows could be shot and darts, spears, and stones could be hurled at the approaching enemy.' Additionally, some towns were further fortified by dry stone walls, ramparts, ditches, and even agave hedges. (Note: Including, for instance, Tulum, Mayapan, Ake, Tulumqui, and an unnamed town in Cehache (Roys 1943, p. 68).) Furthermore, though there is 'no direct evidence of military alliances' among any of the provinces prior to Spanish conquest, 'there can be little doubt that such existed,' for instance, between Cupul, Cochuah, and Sotuta, during their allied assault on Spanish forces at Mérida in 1542. There is also some evidence of extra-regional military alliance, for instance, between Chetumal and the [non-provincial] settlements on the Ulua River, as '[a]fter the Spaniards were driven out of Chetumal [...], an expedition of fifty war canoes from this [province] came to assist the natives living on the Ulua River in Honduras in their resistance to the Spanish invaders there.' Similar alliances have been proposed between some provinces in the southwestern portion of the Peninsula, and [non-provincial] settlements in Tabasco.

==== Spiritual ====
Religious functions are thought to have formed an important part of the duties discharged by senior civil servants across the provinces. For instance, '[m]any important ceremonies were not performed at the temple, but in the private oratory of the batab [mayor] or some other wealthy person of high rank.' (Note: Though descriptions of such oratories are scarce, a report from Tayasal notes one such featured 'idols, a large stone table with twelve seats of the priests, and some hieoglyphic books' (Roys 1943, p. 72).) Furthermore, some or many nobles or senior civil servants purported to hold exclusive favour with certain gods, especially Kukulkan, such that offerings to said gods could not be made directly, but rather required the intercession of one such noble or office holder. For instance, both office-holding nobles and priests presided over a pan-regional, annual, five-day festival to Kukulkan at Mani, where the god was worshipped 'with unusual pomp and ceremony, since he was the special patron of these warlike rulers.'

At least some religious ceremonies are thought to have incorporated state functions. For instance, year's-end ceremonies for the coming year, presided over by clergy at temples, and described as 'perhaps the most important [of the various recurring religious rites],' are known to have involved '[e]laborate formalities [...] in dismissing the old [civil service] incumbents and installing the new in office.'

=== Rights ===
==== To land ====
The system of land tenure employed across the provinces has not been fully elucidated. The system is commonly described as 'communal ownership,' following accounts by Gaspar Antonio Chi. (Note: The lands were in common and so between the towns there were no boundaries or landmarks to divide them except between one province and another because of wars, and in the case of certain hollows and caves, plantations of fruit trees and cacao trees, and certain lands which had been purchased for the purpose of improving them in some respect. — Gaspar A. Chi in Chronicle of Calkini, via Roys 1943, p. 36.) Though details regarding the purported 'communal ownership' are still debated, it is commonly agreed that 'there was no private ownership of land.' (Note: For instance, though Chi asserts that 'salt beds were [...] held in common,' salt makers are known to have owed royalties 'to the local "lord" ' for their use (Roys 1943, pp. 36–37). Similarly, the Mani Treaty of 1557 seemingly 'suggests that the ruling class had in some way a preferred position in regard to the land' (Roys 1943, p. 37). Furthermore, Landa, in his Relación, seemingly 'suggests that such [lands being common property such that the first squatter earns title] had not always been the case' (Roys 1943, p. 37).) For instance, a deed of sale dated 1561 records 'an individual title to a tract of land and its conveyance "to the principal men of the town here at Ebtun," ' with the vendor further noting that the conveyed title 'is the "title of the forest of my ancestors." ' Similarly, at least some majority-Maya colonial towns are known to have held joint ownership over land within town limits, with town lots owned by the municipality, but fruit trees in orchards (and possibly, similar improvements to land) owned privately.

==== Of rebellion ====
It has been suggested that either the nobility or the commons reserved the right to remove their government from office for breaches of duty or propriety, such as a senior officer's 'becoming arrogant and disdainful of his people, demanding a high tribute, making slaves of the people, oppressing the poor, or conducting himself wantonly.' (Note: Okoshi et al. 2021, pp. 312–319 suggest that the commons were 'an anonymous agent [...] quite active' in the 'rupture, transformation, or continuity' of government, noting: 1. precedent of such agency in at least three northern provinces, 2. suggestion of reciprocal duty in phrases used to describe a mayor's governing or being in charge of a town, namely mekantic kah, 'holding the town in his breast, or taking care of the town,' and kamci kah, 'serving the town (during his government),'; 3. presence of check on authority via the council's veto power over mayoral directives.) It has been further noted that the nobility may have fostered the commons' belief in such a right for pecuniary gain. For instance, the mid-fifteenth century rebellion against the governor of Tutul Xiu, then based in Mayapan, was publicly justified by the sovereign's 'arrogant and disdainful attitude towards his people,' but privately led by noblemen who may have rather sought to break the governor's monopoly on the lucrative slave trade with non-provincial settlements in Ulua, Honduras.

== Society ==
=== Classes ===
A tri-partite first-order horizontal subdivision, into nobles, commoners, and slaves, is commonly given for societies across the provinces. Second-order horizontal subdivisions are also likely. For instance, commoners seem 'to have had an upper and a lower fringe,' though there is 'little information' regarding these. Additionally, however, a multi-partite first-order vertical subdivision, into various ch'ibalo'ob, 'extended families or patronymic groups,' is also given for such societies. Such groups, which cut across the nobility and commons, are thought to have 'contributed greatly to social solidarity,' as members 'of the same patronymic considered themselves to be of the same kin and treated one another as such.' (Note: Nonetheless, details of noble–commoner interaction within lineages or houses 'still remain something of a problem' (Roys 1943, p. 35).) Each such lineage or house is thought to have had its own patron deity, and its own codex recording genealogy, membership, and related matters.

==== Nobility ====
The almeheno'ob, 'nobility,' 'constituted the ruling class, filled the more important political offices, and were not only the most valiant warriors and members of the military orders but also the wealthiest farmers and merchants.' As many, if not all, priests are thought to have belonged to the nobility, such that the nobility subsumed civil, military, economic, and religious leaders, this social class is thought to have 'control[led] most fields of human activity.' Noble families were known for paying 'much attention to their genealogy,' particularly if this could be traced to the nobility of Mayapan. Such families were further thought to have 'had a secret lore handed down from father to son, a sort of ritual in which many words had a concealed meaning not understood by any except the initiates[, the knowledge of which] was an important evidence of noble descent.'

==== Commons ====
The commoners, who 'made up the vast majority of the population,' were 'the free workers [...], including the artisans, fishermen, and small farmers and merchants generally.' The commons seem to have been further subdivided into upper, middle, and lower 'fringes,' the former consisting of wealthier commoners, the middle fringe of poorer commoners, and the lower fringe of serfs. Commoners, particularly wealthier ones, are thought to have enjoyed some, albeit limited, esteem and agency. For instance, at least in some provinces, they are thought to have held non-noble titles. (Note: Namely, ayik'al was employed as a title for wealthy common men in Ah Canul (Roys 1943, p. 34, Roys 1957, pp. 11–12).) Furthermore, at least in some provinces, they are thought to have enjoyed pre-eminence in official tables of precedence, and their relatives are thought to have been eligible for the civil service via a standardised exam.

==== Slaves ====
The slaves 'most of [whom belonged] to the nobles or wealthy commoners,' were men, women, and children of the commons of settlements outside the province who had been captured in battle. (Note: Noble captives were, instead, 'usually sacrificed, although they were sometimes ransomed' (Roys 1943, p. 34). Additionally, some slaves were residents of the province who had been sentenced to slavery (Roys 1943, p. 34). Lastly, at least some slaves may have been bought in market rather than captured in battle, as 'a large slave traffic existed' (Roys 1943, p. 35).) Indeed, it is thought that one of the principal motivations for war 'was the desire to capture slaves.' Slaves were traded within and between provinces, as 'a large slave traffic existed.' Male slaves were typically employed for heavy manual labour in agriculture, fisheries, construction, and trade, while female slaves were typically employed in domestic service. They are thought to have been 'subjected to severity and harshness, and frequently sacrificed at the religious festivals.' 'For instance, skeletal remains of several sacrificial victims recovered from the Sacred Cenote 'revealed some indications of malnutrition and definite evidence of abuse for a considerable period prior to death.'

== Economy ==
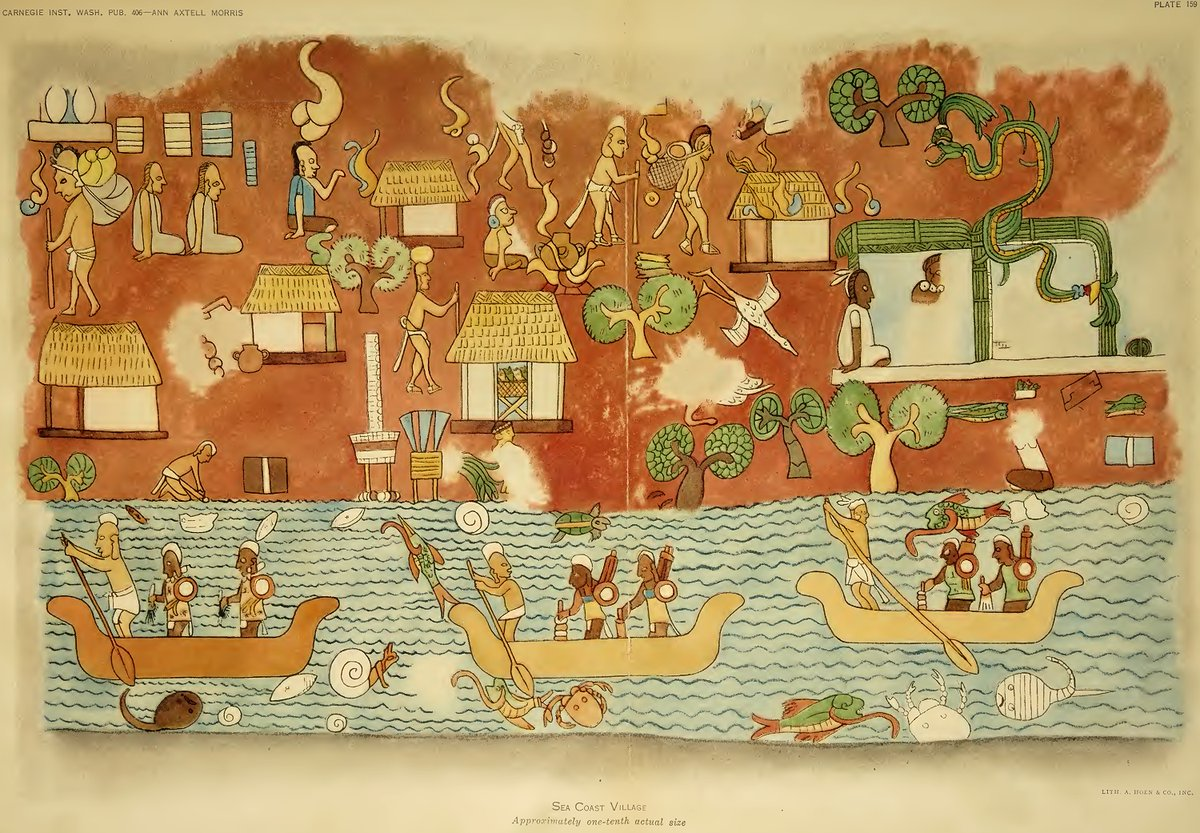
Sea coast village / pre-Columbian fresco in the Temple of Warriors, Chichen Itza / 1931 reproduction by Ann A. Morris / via HathiTrust

=== Trade ===
The province's merchants are commonly thought to have been 'central participants' in the flourishing Mesoamerican maritime and overland commerce, providing both goods and shipping facilities to a trade network stretching from the Aztec Triple Alliance to northern Honduras (at least) or Panama (at most). The coastal capitals of the Ecab, Chikinchel, Cozumel, and Chetumal provinces are thought to have served as principal trans-shipment hubs for 'immense canoes' loaded with salt, textiles, honey, flint, and feathers for export, or metals, cacao, precious stones, obsidian, and pelts for import.

== List ==
Not all Postclassic Maya states or polities in the Lowlands, or even within the Yucatán Peninsula, are deemed kuchkabalo'ob, 'provinces,' by scholars. Additionally, there is much disagreement regarding which polities did nor did not constitute a province, and regarding details of their constitution, extent, organisation, and related matters. The accompanying table lists all entities recognised as Postclassic Maya states or polities in the Lowlands, and, for each, indicates whether these have or have not been considered provinces.

=== Table ===
Postclassic Maya polities (both provincial and non-provincial) in the Yucatán Peninsula. (Note: Columns Roys^{i}, Roys^{ii}, Wall, and Okos indicate acceptance (Yes) or rejection (No) of a polity as a province by, respectively, Roys 1943, p. 11, Roys 1957, p. iii, Wallace 2020, pp. 95, 97, and Okoshi et al. 2021, p. 294. Column Capital lists provincial capitals per Roys 1957, p. 2 or Wallace 2020, p. 95. Abbreviations Unit, Fedl, and U in column Type stand for 'unitary constitution,' 'federal constitution,' and 'uncertain constitution [of a set of towns].' Superscript ^{p} in column Type stands for 'probably,' 'seemingly,' and related qualifiers. Column Location lists approximate centroid location per Wallace 2020, p. 95.)
Name	Capital	Location	Type	Roys^{i}	Roys^{ii}	Wall	Okos	Notes
Ah Canul; Ahcanul	Calkini	Camp	Fedl	Yes	Yes	Yes	Yes	cf (Note: Per Roys 1943, pp. 11, 62, Roys 1957, pp. iii, 13, Wallace 2020, p. 95, Okoshi et al. 2021, p. 296.)
Ah Kin Chel; Ahkinchel	Tecoh	Yucn	Unit^{p}	Yes	Yes	Yes	Yes	cf (Note: Per Roys 1943, pp. 11, 59, Roys 1957, pp. iii, 2, Wallace 2020, p. 95, Okoshi et al. 2021, p. 296. Roys 1957, pp. 81–82 gives value for Type column as 'apparently' Unit.)
Can Pech; Canpech	Campeche (city)	Camp	–	Yes	Yes	Yes	Yes	cf (Note: Per Roys 1943, p. 11, Roys 1957, pp. iii, 2, 168, Wallace 2020, p. 95.)
Ceh Pech; Cehpech, Ech, Motul	Motul	Yucn	Unit	Yes	Yes	Yes	Yes	cf (Note: Per Roys 1943, pp. 11, 59, Roys 1957, pp. iii, 2, 41, Wallace 2020, p. 95, Okoshi et al. 2021, p. 296.)
Chable	–	Q Roo	–	No	No	No	No	cf (Note: Found in Wallace 2020, p. 95.)
Chakan	–	Yucn	Fedl^{p}	Yes	Yes	No	Yes	cf (Note: Per Roys 1943, pp. 11, 62, Roys 1957, p. iii, Okoshi et al. 2021, p. 296. Roys 1957, pp. 35, 41 gives value for Type column as either U^{p} or, 'at most,' Fedl^{p}.)
Champoton; Chanputun	Champoton	Camp	Unit	Yes	Yes	No	Yes	cf (Note: Per Roys 1943, pp. 11, 59, Roys 1957, pp. iii, 2, 167, Okoshi et al. 2021, p. 296.)
Chetumal; Chactemal	Chetumal (Santa Rita)	Corzl	Unit	Yes	Yes	Yes	Yes	cf (Note: Per Roys 1943, p. 11, Roys 1957, pp. iii, 2, 159, 162, Wallace 2020, p. 95.)
Chikinchel; Chauaca, Chauacha, Chauac-Ha	Chauac-Ha	Yucn	U^{p}	Yes	Yes	Yes	Yes	cf (Note: Per Roys 1943, p. 11, Roys 1957, pp. iii, 104, Wallace 2020, p. 95. Roys 1957, p. 104 gives value for Type column as either Fedl^{p} or U^{p}, stating, '[the province] does not seem to have been a very closely united province, for Chauaca sometimes warred with Sinsimato and appears to have been on unfriendly terms with Ake[, n]evertheless, the towns were apparently united in the common purpose of keeping the provinces to the south from exploiting their salt beds.')
Cochuah	Tihosuco	Yucn	Unit	Yes	Yes	Yes	Yes	cf (Note: Per Roys 1943, pp. 11, 59, Roys 1957, pp. iii, 2, 137, Wallace 2020, p. 95, Okoshi et al. 2021, p. 296.)
Cozumel; Cozumel Isl., Cuzamil	–	Q Roo	Unit	Yes	Yes	Yes	Yes	cf (Note: Per Roys 1943, pp. 11, 59, Roys 1957, p. iii, Wallace 2020, p. 95, Okoshi et al. 2021, p. 296.)
Cupul; Copul	–	Yucn	Fedl	Yes	Yes	Yes	Yes	cf (Note: Per Roys 1943, pp. 11, 62–63, Roys 1957, pp. iii, 113–114, Wallace 2020, p. 95. Okoshi et al. 2021, p. 296 give value for Type column as U or U^{p}, stating, '[Copul] does not seem to have been unified, instead being noted as composed of an independent group of towns,' citing for this Roys 1943, p. 62.)
Dzuluinicob	Tipu	Cayo	–	No	No	No	No	–
Ecab; Ekab, Boxchen	–	Q Roo	–	Yes	Yes	Yes	Yes	cf (Note: Per Roys 1943, p. 11, Roys 1957, pp. iii, 143, Wallace 2020, pp. 95, 324.)
Hocaba; Hocaba & Homun, Hocava	Hocaba	Yucn	Unit	Yes	Yes	Yes	Yes	cf (Note: Per Roys 1943, pp. 11, 59, Roys 1957, pp. iii, 2, 55, Wallace 2020, pp. 95, 324, Okoshi et al. 2021, p. 296.)
Kejache; Cehaches	–	Petén	–	Yes	No	No	Yes	cf (Note: Per Roys 1943, p. 11.)
Kowoj	Topoxte; Saklamakhal (Ixlu)	Petén	–	No	No	No	No	–
Manche; Manche Chol	–	Toledo	–	No	No	No	No	–
Mopan	Mopan (San Luis, Guatemala)	Petén	–	No	No	No	No	–
Sotuta; Sotata, Cotata, Sutata, Çozuta	Sotuta	Yucn	Unit	Yes	Yes	Yes	Yes	cf (Note: Per Roys 1943, pp. 11, 59, Roys 1957, pp. iii, 2, 95, Wallace 2020, pp. 95, 325, Okoshi et al. 2021, p. 296.)
Tayasal; Tah Itza	Nojpetén	Petén	Unit^{p}	Yes	No	No	Yes	cf (Note: Per Roys 1943, pp. 11, 59, Okoshi et al. 2021, p. 296.)
Tazes; Tases, Tasees	Chancenote	Yucn	Unit^{p}	Yes	Yes	Yes	Yes	cf (Note: Per Roys 1943, pp. 11, 59, Roys 1957, pp. iii, 109, Wallace 2020, p. 95, Okoshi et al. 2021, p. 296. Roys 1957, p. 109 gives value for the Type column as Fedl.)
Tixchel; Chontal, Chontal Maya	Itzamkanac	Camp	–	No	No	No	No	–
Tutul Xiu; Tutul-Xiu, Mani	Mani	Yucn	Unit	Yes	Yes	Yes	Yes	cf (Note: Per Roys 1943, pp. 11, 59, Roys 1957, pp. iii, 2, Wallace 2020, p. 95, Okoshi et al. 2021, p. 296.)
Uaymil	–	Q Roo	–	No	Yes	No	Yes	cf (Note: Per Roys 1957, p. iii.)
Yalain	–	Petén	–	No	No	No	No	–

== Legacy ==
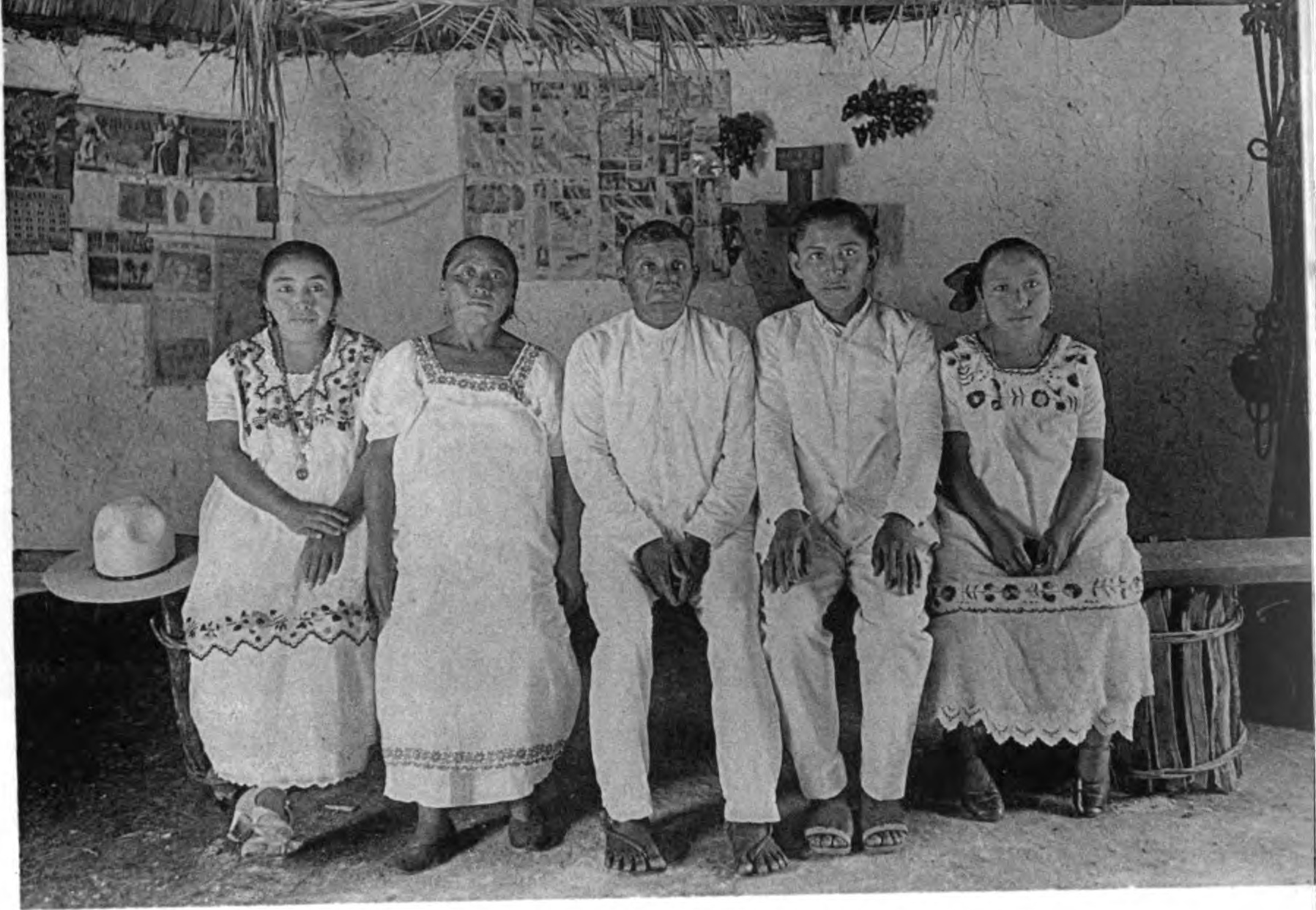
Nemecio Xiu (centre) and his family / Fig. 18 in Roys 1943 / via HathiTrust

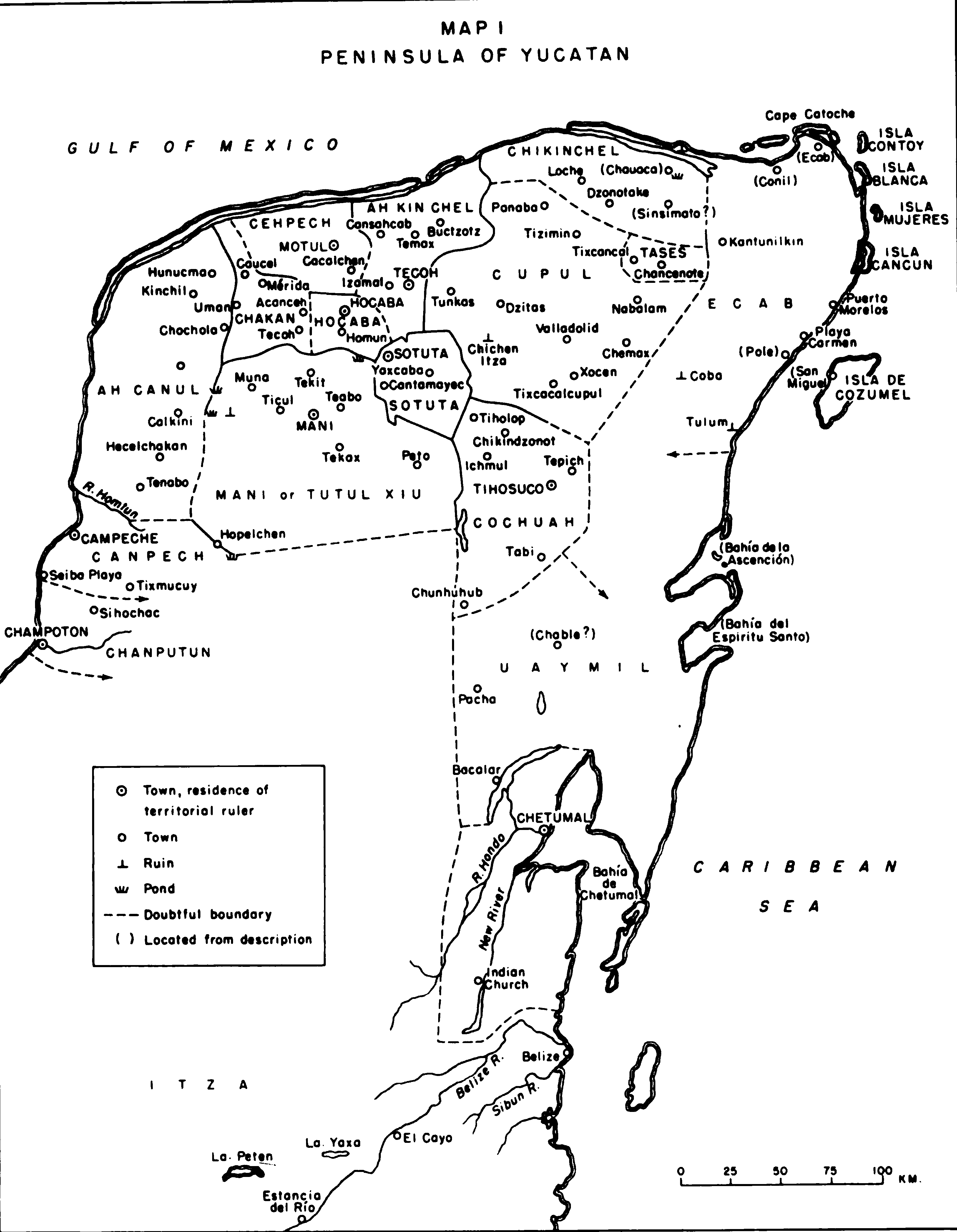
The Yucatán Peninsula / showing kuchkabalo'ob prior to Spanish conquest / Map 1 in Roys 1957 / via HathiTrust

=== Social ===
Upon conquest, the newly established province of Yucatán 'not only allowed [the provincial nobility] to survive, but gave it definite and even liberal encouragement,' at least within encomienda, reducción, and misión settlements. (Note: This is thought to have been Spanish protocol at the time of conquest, with Juan de Solórzano noting that 'it was always their [the Catholic Kings of Spain] royal will that in the towns of Indians there [in the New World], which were found to have some form of organised government [...], there should be maintained to rule and govern them particularly those petty kings or captains who did this in the time of their paganism, or those who may prove themselves to be their descendants' (Roys 1943, p. 131). The policy was further confirmed for all colonies by, at least, Philip II in 1557, and Philip III in 1614 (Roys 1943, p. 132).) The pre-Columbian nobility, and by extension, some or large parts of the institutions and offices they formerly held, were preserved in colonial times by confirmation of noble status, precedence for local civil and military offices, and grants of special privileges. (Note: Not all institutions nor offices were formally preserved, however. For instance, the 'political functions of the hol pop [chamberlain or steward] seem to have ceased after the Spanish conquest, but we find him [the officeholder] still acting as chief singer or chanter, in charge of the drums and other musical instruments, and presiding over weddings and assemblies in colonial times' (Roys 1943, p. 64).) For instance, the noble house of Xiu, of Mani, were routinely confirmed 'the rights, privileges, and exemptions hereditary in the [Xiu] family' by Spanish governors, and furthermore, kept their municipal offices (now as gobernadores or caciques), held special status as señores naturales, and often held special licences or commissions (e.g. to lead the native militia, or to bear arms). Similar concessions were afforded to the nobility of, and in some instances to non-noble office holders from, at least, Ah Canul, Ah Kin Chel, Ceh Pech, Chakan, Hocaba, Sotuta, and Tutul Xiu.

One such office, that of mayor or alcalde, was further authorised by the parliament of British Honduras in the mid-nineteenth century, upon an influx of Maya refugees from the Caste War, and remains, as of 2022, an office in various village councils across Toledo, Belize.

=== Scholarly ===
Scholars have long been intrigued by the nature of these [provincial] polities, as their characteristics offer potential insights into the nature of the organisation of prehispanic Maya society. Despite this interest, however, fundamental questions about the provinces remain. How would we classify them in modern terminology? (As native states, primitive city-states, confederations of towns, or chiefdoms?) How many were there? (Estimates [as of 1984] vary between sixteen and twenty-four.) What was the extent of their domains? The last question has been, for practical reasons, the most pursued.

— Anthony P. Andrews in a 1984 literature review for the Journal of Anthropological Research.

The earliest non-Maya attempt to 'reconstruct the political geography of the preconquest Maya' is credited to Diego de Landa's 1566 Relación de las cosas de Yucatán. However, it is rather Ralph Roys's 1957 Political Geography of the Yucatan Maya which, by the late twentieth century, became the 'most widely accepted reconstruction of the political geography of contact-period Yucatán.' (Note: Notable works during 1567–1956 included that by Eligio Ancona (published 1878–1880), Crescencio Carrillo y Ancona (1881), Daniel G. Brinton (1882), Juan Francisco Molina Solís (1896), J. Leslie Mitchell (1935), M. Wells Jakeman (1938), and Jorge Ignacio Rubio Mañé (1957) (Andrews 1984, p. 590). Pre-1890 works have been deemed 'very limited,' while early twentieth century work has been described as 'more compatible with Roys's [1957] scheme' (Andrews 1984, p. 590).) However, by the 1980s, the state of knowledge in the field was still not considered settled, with several as-yet-open questions being deemed 'substantial,' and existing knowledge presenting 'a large number of contradictions.'

Scholars have customarily conceived of kuchkabalo'ob, 'provinces,' as 'territorial units,' in keeping with sixteenth century Hispano-Maya thought. Recently, however, they have tended to eschew this rigid view (of territorially defined provinces) in favour of more fluid ones (of provinces defined by their jurisdiction, for instance). (Note: For instance, 1. Wallace 2020, pp. 94–96 proposes to define a province as a network consisting of one pre-eminent noble house (in the capital) and all lesser houses (in the capital or towns) owing allegiance or subservience, 2. Okoshi et al. 2021, pp. 311–312 propose to define a unitary province as a network of one governor (in the capital) and all local officers (in the capital or towns) under his authority.) Consequently, competing senses of the term kuchkabal are employed in recent literature, namely, the traditional kuchkabal-as-a-territory, and the innovative kuchkabal-as-a-jurisdiction, with the former emphasising a province's fixed extent or footprint, and the latter its dynamic networks or relations of authority. (Note: For instance, Roys 1957, pp. 2, 62 uses the terms Tutul Xiu, Mani, and Calotmul to name, respectively, a territorial province, its capital, and one of its settlements. In contrast, Wallace 2020, pp. 94–96 uses said terms to name, respectively, a non-political cultural or geographic territory, a jurisdictional province, and another (distinct) jurisdicitional province.)

== Glossary ==
=== Table ===
Glossary of Yucatecan Mayan terms commonly employed in literature discussing Postclassic Maya polities of the Yucatán Peninsula. (Note: Terms in the Term column are spelt as per Barrera Vásquez et al. 1980. Terms composed of an article or pronoun followed by a noun phrase are recorded in the Term and Variants columns as a noun phrase followed by the article pronoun in brackets, eg ah kulel is rendered kulel (ah). Terms in the Variants column are alternative spellings or synonyms, both in the singular case, of those in the Terms column. The Definition column excludes senses or definitions of a term which are not employed in the relevant literature.)
Term	Variants	Gloss	Definition	Notes
ahaw kan	ahaw ka'an, p'ook yo'pat (ah)	archbishop, bishop	senior ecclesiastic office holder in a state	Span.: obispo cf Barrera Vásquez et al. 1980, p. 4, Roys 1943, pp. 78–79
almehen	–	nobleman, aristocrat, peer	member of the nobility, peerage, or aristocracy	Span.: noble, hidalgo, caballero cf Barrera Vásquez et al. 1980, p. 14, Roys 1943, p. 33
ayik'al	ayik'il	wealthy commoner	wealthy or powerful member of the commons	cf Barrera Vásquez et al. 1980, p. 20, Roys 1943, p. 34, Roys 1957, pp. 11–12
batab	bel na (ah), mek'tan kab (ah), nen kab (u)	mayor, viceroy, cacique, chief, commissioned officer, magistrate	most senior office holder in a settlement, exercising (at least) executive, judicial, and military authority	Span.: cacique cf Barrera Vásquez et al. 1980, pp. 39–40, Roys 1943, pp. 60–63
batabil	belnail, belnalil	city, town, village, hamlet, settlement	the jurisdiction of a batab, i.e. a settlement	Span.: cacicazgo cf Barrera Vásquez et al. 1980, p. 40
batabil kah	batabil kah (u)	local officers, local authorities	senior office holders in a settlement	cf Barrera Vásquez et al. 1980, p. 40
ch'ibal	1. ch'iibal, ch'iilankabil, siya'nil, ts'akaba' 2. –; 3. chi'ibal, chibal	1. extended family 2. patronymic group 3. noble house, dynasty	1. individuals related by patrilineal descent (as a whole or body); 2. individuals sharing a patronymic (as a whole or body); 3. noble or aristocratic house or dynasty	cf Barrera Vásquez et al. 1980, pp. 133–134, Wallace 2020, p. 94
chila'n (ah)	chila'n t'an, chilam	prophet, seer, soothsayer	priest specialising in prophetic or divinatory rites	Span.: profeta cf Barrera Vásquez et al. 1980, p. 99, Roys 1943, pp. 79–80
chimal	chimal che'	shield	shield employed in battle	cf Barrera Vásquez et al. 1980, p. 100
chulul	–	hardwood	hardwood of the Apoplanesia paniculata tree, used for weaponry	cf Barrera Vásquez et al. 1980, p. 114
halach winik	halach uinic, yaxmehen ahaw	governor, sovereign, ruler, commander-in-chief, chief justice	most senior office holder in a state	lit. trans.: 'real man' cf Barrera Vásquez et al. 1980, p. 175, Roys 1943, pp. 31, 59–61, 129
halach winikil	–	officers of state	1. senior office holders in a state 2. the jurisdiction of such office holders, i.e. a state	cf Barrera Vásquez et al. 1980, p. 175
hol pop (ah)	–	chamberlain, steward, keeper	senior office holder in a settlement, responsible (at least) for maintaining the popol na, and for presiding over civil and lay functions held therein	Span.: príncipe del convite, mandón cf Barrera Vásquez et al. 1980, p. 228, Roys 1943, p. 64, Roys 1957, p. 94
holkan	–	enlisted ranksman, special forces member	active soldier selected for special service during wartime by the nakom	lit. trans.: 'snake-head,' cf Barrera Vásquez et al. 1980, p. 226, Roys 1943, p. 67
k'in (ah)	k'in (h)	priest	priest	cf Barrera Vásquez et al. 1980, p. 401
kah	1. cah 2. –	1. settlement 2. –	1. settlement 2. named place, location, or territory, including that of a settlement	cf Barrera Vásquez et al. 1980, pp. 280–281, Wallace 2020, p. 94
kuch kab (ah)	belnal (ah), mek'tan kah (ah), kuch ha'ab, cuch cab (ah)	alderman, councillor	senior office holder in a settlement, holding (typically) a seat in local council and authority over an assigned ward	Span.: mayordomo, regidor, jurado cf Barrera Vásquez et al. 1980, p. 344, Roys 1943, pp. 62–63, 129, Bührer et al. 2017, p. 38, Wallace 2020, p. 97
kuchkabal	1. – 3. kuchteel, bak' kah, bak'an kah tu pach, hatsal, hatsul, kah, lu'um, petén, tsukubté 4. cuchcabal 5. chuchteel, balnail, ba'alnail	1. – 3. province, state, polity 4. capital 5. close family, household	1. the jurisdiction of a capital city, or of the most senior offices of state, i.e. a state 2. the territory of such a state 3. the subjects, citizens, nationals, or residents (as a whole or body) of such a state 4. the seat of the most senior offices of state, i.e. the capital city of a state 5. members of a household, or close family members (as a whole or body)	Span.: comarca, provincia, región cf Barrera Vásquez et al. 1980, p. 344, Wallace 2020, pp. 94–96
kuchteel	1. kuchtel, cuchteel 2. kuchtel	1., 2. ward, borough, neighbourhood	1. the jurisdiction of an ah kuch kab, i.e. administrative division of a settlement 2. the subjects, citizens, nationals, or residents (as a whole or body) of such a division	cf Barrera Vásquez et al. 1980, pp. 344–346, Wallace 2020, p. 97
kulel (ah)	k'ul, k'ul (ah), k'ulel, k'ulel (ah)	deputy, delegate, advocate, prosecutor	non-senior office holder in a settlement	Span.: comisario, lugarteniente cf Barrera Vásquez et al. 1980, pp. 349, 420–421, Roys 1943, p. 62
molay	mulkan, mulkan (ah), likil mulkan, tankab kabil (ah), tan kah (ah)	town council, local council	senior office holders (as a whole or body) in a settlement	Span.: ayuntamiento, cabildo cf Barrera Vásquez et al. 1980, pp. 528, 539, 773
multepal	–	council of governors	the halach winiko'ob (as a whole or body) of a confederacy or coalition of states	cf Barrera Vásquez et al. 1980, p. 540
nakom	1. nakon, nakomal, chun k'atun (ah), na' k'atun (ah), na' k'atun (u); 2. nakom balam, nakom balam (ah)	1. non-commissioned officer, captain 2. sacrificial priest	1. senior military office holder in a settlement 2. priest specialising in sacrificial rites	Span.: alférez, capitán de guerra cf Barrera Vásquez et al. 1980, p. 555, Roys 1943, pp. 62, 64, 66–67, 79
noh kah	1. –; 2. tankah, polkah (u), noh cah	1. city, large town 2. capital	1. large or metropolitan settlement 2. the capital city of a state	cf Barrera Vásquez et al. 1980, p. 574, Wallace 2020, p. 96
pet kah	–	village, hamlet, small town	small or rural settlement	cf Barrera Vásquez et al. 1980, p. 649
pisil kah	pizil cah	commoner	member of the commons	Span.: plebeyo cf Barrera Vásquez et al. 1980, p. 656, Wallace 2020, p. 98
pokche'	–	homestead, hamlet	very small or rural settlement	Span.: ranchería, caserío cf Barrera Vásquez et al. 1980, p. 662
pop	–	ceremonial rug	ceremonial rug symbolic of the state's or settlement's authority	cf Barrera Vásquez et al. 1980, p. 666, Roys 1943, pp. 63–64
popol na	–	meeting house, town hall, courthouse	building in a settlement where civil and lay functions were held, maintained by the ah hol pop	cf Barrera Vásquez et al. 1980, p. 666
tupil	tupil (ah)	constable, bailiff, marshal, clerk	non-senior office holder in a settlement	Span.: alguacil, esbirro cf Barrera Vásquez et al. 1980, p. 824, Roys 1943, p. 64
yalba winik	yalba wíinik	commoner	member of the commons	Span.: plebeyo cf Barrera Vásquez et al. 1980, p. 965, Wallace 2020, p. 98
yumtun	yuntun	slingshot	slingshot employed in battle	Span.: honda cf Barrera Vásquez et al. 1980, p. 983

== Notes and references ==
=== Full citations ===
1. Andrews, Anthony P. (Winter 1984). "The Political Geography of the Sixteenth Century Yucatan Maya: Comments and Revisions". Journal of Anthropological Research. 40 (4). Albuquerque, New Mexico, US: University of New Mexico: 589–596. doi:10.1086/jar.40.4.3629799. JSTOR 3629799. S2CID 163743879. (subscription required)
2. Barrera Vásquez, Alfredo; Bastarrachea Manzano, Juan Ramón; Brito Sansores, William; Vermont Salas, Refugio; Dzul Góngora, David; Dzul Poot, Domingo, eds. (1980). Diccionario maya Cordemex : maya-español, español-maya (1st ed.). Merida: Ediciones Cordemex. OCLC 7550928.
3. Braswell, Geoffrey E., ed. (2022). 3,000 Years of War and Peace in the Maya Lowlands : Identity, Politics, and Violence. Routledge archaeology of the ancient Americas. London: Routledge. doi:10.4324/9781351268004. ISBN 9781351268004. OCLC 1273727431. S2CID 246542762.
4. Bührer, Tanja; Eichmann, Flavio; Förster, Stig; Stuchtey, Benedikt, eds. (2017). Cooperation and empire : local realities of global processes. New York, NY: Berghahn Books. ISBN 9781785336096. OCLC 994205598.
5. Caso Barrera, Laura; Aliphat Fernández, Mario (April–June 2002). "Organización política de los itzaes desde el posclásico hasta 1702". Historia Mexicana. 51 (4): 713–748. JSTOR 25139407.
6. Demarest, Arthur A.; Rice, Prudence M.; Rice, Don S., eds. (2004). The Terminal Classic in the Maya lowlands : collapse, transition, and transformation. Boulder, Colorado: University Press of Colorado. ISBN 0870817396. OCLC 52311867.
7. Durand Alcántara, Carlos H. (January–April 2006). "El derecho agrario mesoamericano (entre el derecho y la costumbre) (Los aztecas y mayas)". Alegatos. 20 (62): 87–121. ISSN 2007-6916.
8. Foias, Antonia E., ed. (2014). Ancient Maya political dynamics. Maya studies. Gainesville, Florida: University Press of Florida. ISBN 9780813048321. OCLC 846494688.
9. Fox, John W.; Cook, Garrett W.; Chase, Arlen F.; Chase, Diane Z. (December 1996). "Questions of Political and Economic Integration: Segmentary Versus Centralized States among the Ancient Maya". Current Anthropology. 37 (4): 795–801. doi:10.1086/204563. JSTOR 2744415. S2CID 717531.
10. Gerhard, Peter (1993) [First published 1979 by Princeton University Press]. The Southeastern Frontier of New Spain (Rev. ed.). Norman, OK; London: University of Oklahoma Press. ISBN 0806125438. OCLC 27034766.
11. Gillespie, Susan D. (September 2000). "Rethinking Ancient Maya Social Organization: Replacing "Lineage" with "House"". American Anthropologist. 102 (3): 467–484. doi:10.1525/aa.2000.102.3.467.
12. Graham, Elizabeth A. (2011). Maya Christians and Their Churches in Sixteenth-Century Belize. Gainesville, FL: University Press of Florida. ISBN 9780813040721. OCLC 751694131.
13. Iannone, Gyles, ed. (2014). The Great Maya Droughts in Cultural Context: Case Studies in Resilience and Vulnerability. Boulder, Colorado: University Press of Colorado. ISBN 9781607322801. OCLC 873807557.
14. Lehmann, Christian (16 December 2018). "Ortografía". La lengua maya de Yucatán. Christian Lehmann. Archived from the original on 5 August 2021.
15. Marcus, Joyce (1976). Emblem and state in the classic Maya Lowlands : an epigraphic approach to territorial organization. Washington, DC: Dumbarton Oaks; Trustees for Harvard University. OCLC 2805235.
16. Marino, Marc D.; Fargher, Lane F.; Meissner, Nathan J.; Martindale Johnson, Lucas R.; Blanton, Richard E.; Heredia Espinoza, Verenice Y. (December 2020). "Exchange Systems in Late Postclassic Mesoamerica: Comparing Open and Restricted Markets at Tlaxcallan, Mexico, and Santa Rita Corozal, Belize". Latin American Antiquity. 31 (4): 780–799. doi:10.1017/laq.2020.69. S2CID 229168768. ProQuest 2468804157.
17. Masson, Marilyn A.; Freidel, David A.; Demarest, Arthur A., eds. (2020). The real business of ancient Maya economies : from farmers' fields to rulers' realms. Gainesville, Florida: University Press of Florida. ISBN 9780813057408. OCLC 1112131447.
18. Okoshi, Tsubasa; Chase, Arlen F.; Nondédéo, Philippe; Arnauld, Charlotte, eds. (2021). Maya kingship : rupture and transformation from classic to postclassic times. Maya studies. Gainesville, Florida: University Press of Florida. ISBN 9780813057699. OCLC 1193557896.
19. Quezada, Sergio (2014) [First published 1993 by Colegio de México]. Maya lords and lordship : the formation of colonial society in Yucatán, 1350-1600. Translated by Rugeley, Terry (Rev. trans. ed.). Norman, OK: University of Oklahoma Press. ISBN 9780806144221. OCLC 847529166.
20. Rice, Prudence M. (2004). Maya political science :time, astronomy, and the cosmos. Austin, TX: University of Texas Press. ISBN 0292797389. OCLC 60612439.
21. Rice, Prudence M. (December 2013). "Texts and the Cities: Modeling Maya Political Organization". Current Anthropology. 54 (6): 684–715. doi:10.1086/673500. S2CID 142052983.
22. Roys, Ralph L (1943). The Indian background of colonial Yucatan. Publication 548. Washington, DC: Carnegie Institution of Washington. hdl:2027/txu.059172012031846. OCLC 26104478.
23. Roys, Ralph L (1957). The political geography of the Yucatan Maya. Publication 613. Washington, DC: Carnegie Institution of Washington. hdl:2027/uva.x000422247. OCLC 1851713.
24. Sauer, Brooklyn (20 April 2018). "Digital History and Reconstruction of the Political Geography of the Yucatan Peninsula". Celebration of Student Scholarship Posters Archive. Morehead State University.
25. Tagesson, Göran; Cornell, Per; Gardiner, Mark; Thomas, Liz; Weikert, Katherine, eds. (2020). 'For My Descendants and Myself, a Nice and Pleasant Abode' - Agency, Micro-History and Built Environment : Buildings in Society International BISI III, Stockholm 2017. Oxford: Archaeopress. doi:10.2307/j.ctv1ddckrm. ISBN 9781789695823. JSTOR j.ctv1ddckrm. OCLC 1231610980. S2CID 241221214.
26. Wallace, Geoffrey H. (2020). The History and Geography of Beeswax Extraction in the Northern Maya Lowlands, 1540–1700 (PhD thesis). Montreal, Canada: McGill University. ProQuest 28266933.
