= Tases =

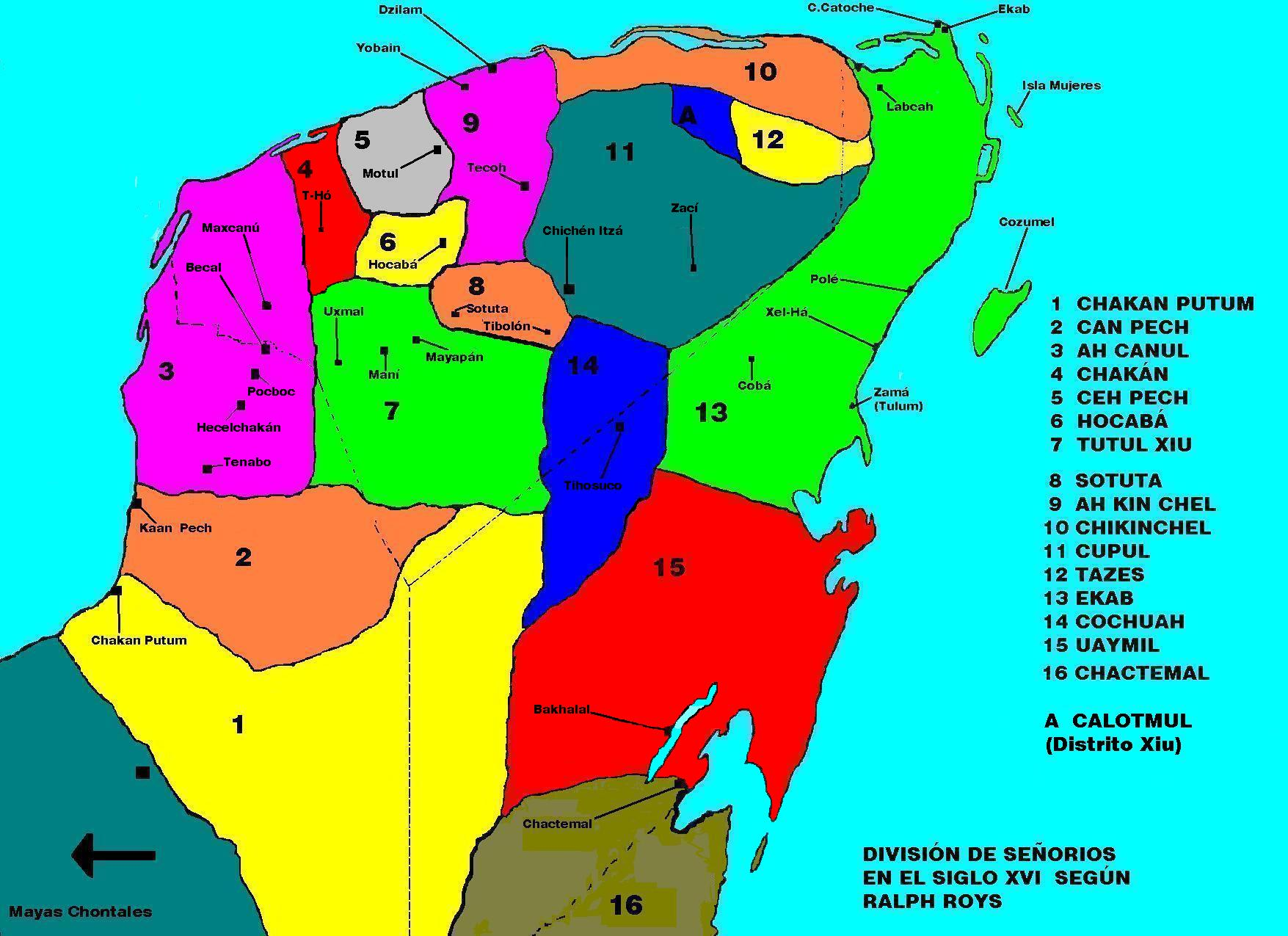
Chiefdoms of Yucatán: marked 12

Tases, also Tazes or Tasees, was the name of a Maya kuchkabal polity of the northeastern Yucatán Peninsula, before the arrival of the Spanish conquistadors in the sixteenth century. The name may be a corruption of Maya Tah Dzeh, meaning "place of the Dzeh family", which documents suggest were the founders of the polity after the fall of Mayapan. The capital is generally considered to have been Chan Cenote, but it was a confederated group of towns rather than a unitary state. Besides Chan Cenote, the towns of Tixcancal, Tixmukul, Tixholop and Tzemcay fell within this province. Besides the Dzeh, the Huch'im were another prominent family here.
