= Batab =

Batab, which is Yucatec Maya for 'Local village chief, chieftain' (plural: batabo'ob), was the name given to the chief of a town or village called batabil (plural: batabilo'ob).

Sometimes, various batabilo'ob situated in a limited area or jurisdiction in Mayan lands, called a Kuchkabal, could have a variable political or governmental organization concentrating the highest military, priestly, and social authority in one person who was called Halach Uinik whom everyone obeyed, and could work through a council of batabo'ob that met regularly to make important decisions. In either case, the batabo'ob usually belonged to one family or lineage, and because of that, the batab's surname could be used in place of a title. Ah Canul, Tutul Xiu, Cupul are examples.

When there was an ahau, he chose the batab from among members of the aristocracy, usually from among those closely related to him.

In each batabil, the batab relied on other people to perform their duties: the Ah Kulel was a kind of attorney who executed the orders of batab, and tupiles, who were more numerous, were similar to police officers.
