= Halach Uinik =

Halach uinik or halach uinic (Yucatec Maya:'real man') was the name given to the supreme ruler, overlord or chief, as they were called in the colonial period of a Maya kuchkabal.

Most kuchkabal were run by a halach uinik, who ruled on behalf of one of the gods of their pantheon, constituting a theocracy. The succession occurred in the same family, with power passing from parent to child, under the law of primogeniture. The halach uinik concentrated all religious, military and civil power in one person. They chose officials from among the members of the theocracy who helped in the administration of the kuchkabal. They usually designated their family members as heads or batab of the batalib (municipalities) that formed the kuchkabal. These batabob commanded their own soldiers, presided over the local council, implemented justice, and controlled the payment of taxes. In addition to these assignments, they also took care of the fields at the times indicated by the priests or ah k'in.

The halach uinic was lord of a Maya city-state. It was a hereditary office which was transmitted to the eldest child, normally to a son. Its main symbol of power was the "manikin scepter", a ceremonial baton that featured a figurine of K'awiil, the god of life.

Several officials were appointed directly to support the halach uinic. They were:

a. The Ah Holpop: political-religious delegates to the Halach Uinic.

b. The Nacom: was the principal military head of a city-state.

c. The Ahuacan: was the high priest. Watched calendars, sacred books and education. He also directed the sacrifices and rites of divination.

d. The tupil: the guards were guarding public order and law enforcement.

== See also ==
- Ajaw

== Sources ==
- Clendinnen, Inga (2003) [First published 1988]. Ambivalent Conquests: Maya and Spaniard in Yucatan, 1517–1570 (2nd ed.). Cambridge: Cambridge University Press. ISBN 0-521-52731-7. OCLC 50868309 – via Internet Archive.
