= Economy of the Maya civilization =

Economy is conventionally defined as a function for production and distribution of goods and services by multiple agents within a society and/or geographical place An economy is hierarchical, made up of individuals that aggregate to make larger organizations such as governments and gives value to goods and services. The Maya economy had no universal form of trade exchange other than resources and services that could be provided among groups such as cacao beans and coppheological evidence to study the trade of perishable goods, it is noteworthy to explore the trade networks of artifacts and other luxury items that were likely transported together.

While subsistence agriculture played a central role in daily life, the Maya had a mechanism for economic exchange between settlements, which was capable of supporting specialists and a system of merchants through trade routes. Maya specialist Joanne Pillsbury states that "access to imported goods is perhaps the most recoverable aspect of prestige and leadership in ancient states." The power of Maya rulers not only depended on their ability to control resources, but also in managing the production and distribution of status goods as well as (non-local) commodities like salt. Furthermore, Maya laborers were subject to a labor tax to build palaces, temples and public works. A ruler successful in war was able to control more laborers and exact tribute on defeated enemies, further increasing their economic might.

Over the early Neoclassic era (2000 BC to 250 AD), the Maya civilization had spread throughout the Yucatan Peninsula and modern southern Mexican states of Tabasco, Chiapas, Campeche, and Quintana Roo; and expanded throughout Central America in Guatemala, parts of Honduras, sections of El Salvador, and Belize. Large settlements across this region would use their most abundant resources to trade with other groups who did not have a lot of these resources. As part of the social economy, localized trade enabled comparative advantage to be utilised within communities that possessed products in abundance as they were able to exchange these with other communities to acquire what was unavailable locally. This framework was compounded to form a complex economy based on symbiotic relationships between communities and regions, wherein each relied on others to fill specific deficiencies in return for their specialized products, thus maximizing the overall production of the Maya kingdom. There for economic relationships began bilaterally between Maya groups, and from this trade, networks began to develop.

== Economic structure ==
Journalist John Noble Wilford notes that evidence for marketplace activity demonstrates an advanced economic structure. Archeologist Richard Terry used a method of chemical analysis to compare the soil of the ruins of Chunchucmil, an ancient Maya city, to that of a modern, unpaved market in Antigua, Guatemala, revealing that it was likely once a vibrant market. By comparing phosphorus levels, this "soil chemical analysis provides additional lines of evidence that have changed how we think of the ancient Maya's trade patterns. Traditionally we've thought the tax-tribute system was responsible for distributing goods. But this shows that the Maya not only had a marketplace and a market economy but an important middle class of merchants as well."

The ruins of [Chunchucmil] show that "using improved methods of analyzing the chemistry of ancient soils have detected where a large marketplace stood 1,500 years ago in a Maya city on the Yucatan Peninsula of Mexico." This is one of many archaeological sites that show proof of the use of marketplaces and advanced trade networks. Spondylus shell and Jadeite that don't belong in local areas have been found in a large number of archaeological sites and burial grounds of the Pre-Columbian Period that prove the existence of complex trade networks. Yet, in the acquisition of these luxury materials, we can see a larger hierarchical framework to Mayan trade. A central debate among Mayanists has been about the nature of Classic Maya political organization and how it articulated with economic systems within and between polities.

=== Maya political economics ===
The classical understanding of Maya political and economic organization follows that production and wealth distribution was largely elite-controlled, for the maintenance of power and to validate their position in the social hierarchy. The control of luxury good and their production is equated to the "materialization of ideologies and rituals." In the context of ideology, this control on production enables the elite to "manipulate and extend ideology", making it a source of power that can be "given material form and controlled by a dominant group." However, Japanese archeologist Kazuo Aoyama points to evidence suggesting that there is greater fluidity between these social roles. In the Classic Period, Aoyama hypothesizes that the elite and artisans each possessed multiple social identities and roles, in an integrated system where the elite are participating in "attached and independent craft production." This evidence would elevate the social standing of artisans beyond what is typically assumed of the Classic Maya.

Political authority by means of controlling the production of luxury objects also gives the elite class a "de facto control" of their distribution. Though archeological evidence is still relatively premature to make any sweeping conclusions, several hypotheses have been made to help explain how elites may have controlled production systems in the Maya context:

1. "Attached specialization" in terms of production on command for elites. Sponsored production by the elite enables them to maintain a high degree of control over the artisans and the distribution of the product. This may be done by establishing attached facilities or by conducting production within their own households.
2. They may collect finished or semi‐finished products from non‐elite households within or outside of their polities through a variety of extractive or exchange mechanisms. This requires political arrangements and an established system of barter, and thus some mechanism that resembles a marketplace.
3. In the form of a domestic economy, where non-elite households are engaged in production when resources are made accessible. As such the elite would need to establish a process for seizing control of the distribution of the finished goods to maintain their elevated status. In this context, production and exchange are two sides of the same political coin and are used together by elites to accumulate resources and exercise control over their respective populations. This hypothesis of domestic, household-level production is supported by archaeological and ethnographic evidence in Mesoamerica
4. Sadly, there is little remaining evidence of large-scale elite management of luxury goods, primarily found from the looting or excavation of burial sites. This archeological issue is likely due to traits associated with luxury goods, which are inherently scared by virtue, and often made of "exotic" raw materials - which gives them their intrinsic value. The evidence of concrete absence outside of elite burial sites lends itself to the conclusion that the provision of these luxury and ritual goods functioned like a "palace economy", whereby they were exchanged between rulers and their noble artisans across long distances in order to validate social alliances and political arrangements. to cement social alliances and political arrangement. That said, there have also been arguments made against this hypothesis, that there was, in fact, non-elite participation in their production, lending itself to a more market economy structure.

Predictably, research at ancient Maya sites has exhibited disproportionate allocation of the highest quality, and most exotic goods to the elite. That said, there is evidence that these goods were more widely distributed in areas where the raw materials are naturally found. For example, jadeite objects was universally considered valuable across the Maya kingdom, but its function was varied by nature of being both utilitarian and religious; because of its close relationship to the "breath spirit", jade also held the function of a funerary rite and the ritual conjuring of gods and ancestors.

=== Chunchucmil as a market economy ===
Chunchucmil is a Classic Maya city in northwest Yucatan, Mexico.

Classic Maya sites in the lowlands of the Yucatan Peninsula has many examples of monumental art and architecture in central sacrosanct spaces, while archeological evidence suggests that their political economies were largely centralized. That said, the predominantly Early Classic site of Chunchucmil sticks out as an anomaly. Despite being an urban population ranks among the largest and most densely packed in any Maya site, it inhabits one of the most depauperate agricultural landscapes. These juxtaposing elements have driven archaeological research to the conclusion that Chunchucmil had a commercialized economy, which comes in direct contrast with the "palace economy" structure detailed in the prior section. This marketplace was functioned not only to serve as a central point of exchange for imported goods but also as a site for servicing merchants along the most active Mesoamerican maritime trade route and funneling long-distance trade items to sites in the interior of the peninsula; the market place was found to have been connected to the periphery by several roadways, making the central location easily accessible by merchants.

Bruce Dahlin's geochemical analysis of the site showed a correlation between phosphate concentrations and rock alignment to further indicate the orientation of the marketplace. The site was mapped as rows of rock alignments and low rock piles. What appeared to be a prepared plaza surface laid on top of these rock piles (with a thickness of between 20 and 50 cm), which pointed to the conclusion that they were foundations of very small ephemeral structures, specifically a marketplace. Soil samples from this outdoor market revealed that concentrations of phosphates were up to 20 times greater than the control soil sites in the rest of Chunchucmil. Furthermore, there was a consistent band of very high phosphate values that was roughly isomorphic (of a similar time) with the long row of rock alignments and rock piles. This pattern was comparable to that of a modern market in Antigua, Guatemala, where rows of market stalls had significantly high phosphates levels as well. High phosphate values may indicate large amounts of food and other organic substances were exchange and/or discarded (perhaps even as a function of waste disposal) here for a considerable period. The centralized nature of it shows this to be a gathering place and perhaps evidence of a marketplace.

=== Labor organization ===
An experimental study of prehistoric construction and attendant labor organization used a unique methodology of deducing human behavior by quantifying the physical activities of Navajo Indians employed as masons in the Ruins Stabilization Project, at the classic site of Pueblo Bonito in Chaco Canyon National Monument, northwestern New Mexico. Through indirect or respiratory calorimetric analysis of the various phases of construction activity, the study depicted a potential labor structure to mirror that of the ancient Puebloan laborers that had initially constructed the Pueblo Bonito site. The methodology revealed that construction activities would be composed of a relative scale of productivity, looking particularly at age and the associated effort; there is no one-to-one correlation between age and productivity. Instead, there was greater evidence of utilizing the inherent productivity of individual workers. This implies that labor taxation may have differed from individual to individual.

Typically, a redistributive economy that is based on the principle of reciprocity excludes compensation, as is typically assumed of the ancient Maya economy. William Rathje argues that changes in material culture from Pre-classic to Post-classic Maya may have reflected policy changes regarding operation costs. He notes that there is an observed shift from a quality to a quantity emphasis in the material production of the Moche culture of Peru, which reflects increase social mobility and changes in cultural symbolism. These factors have potentially significant effects on the procurement and preparation of construction materials. Yet, it is still unclear what determined the compensation structure, if at all.

== Development of trade and specialization ==
Trade was the main factor that kept Maya cities growing economically. This system was a form of free market trade, except in the major cities in which the local government had direct control over the trade networks and economy. Within these larger cities there were almost always established markets with connections all over Mesoamerica including interactions with Olmec and Teotihuacan. All items throughout the Maya world varied in value from one region to another, likely rising in value the farther from its native area it traveled. Prestige items and subsistence items made up the commercialized goods of the Maya. Prestige items were items such as jade, gold, copper, extravagant pottery, ritual items, and any other items used as status symbols by the upper class. Subsistence items were resources used on a daily basis, such as clothing, food, tools, pottery, salt, lithic material, etc. Merchants rose during the Pr Classic and Classic Periods and were directly responsible for the growth in the middle class and elite of Maya communities. The middle class isn't necessarily connected to the merchants themselves but instead to their occupations being profitable due to the presence of the merchants. Whether it was cacao beans, obsidian, or skills such as pottery and lithics, merchants facilitated the growth of occupations throughout the Mayan world.

=== Ceramic economy and trade ===
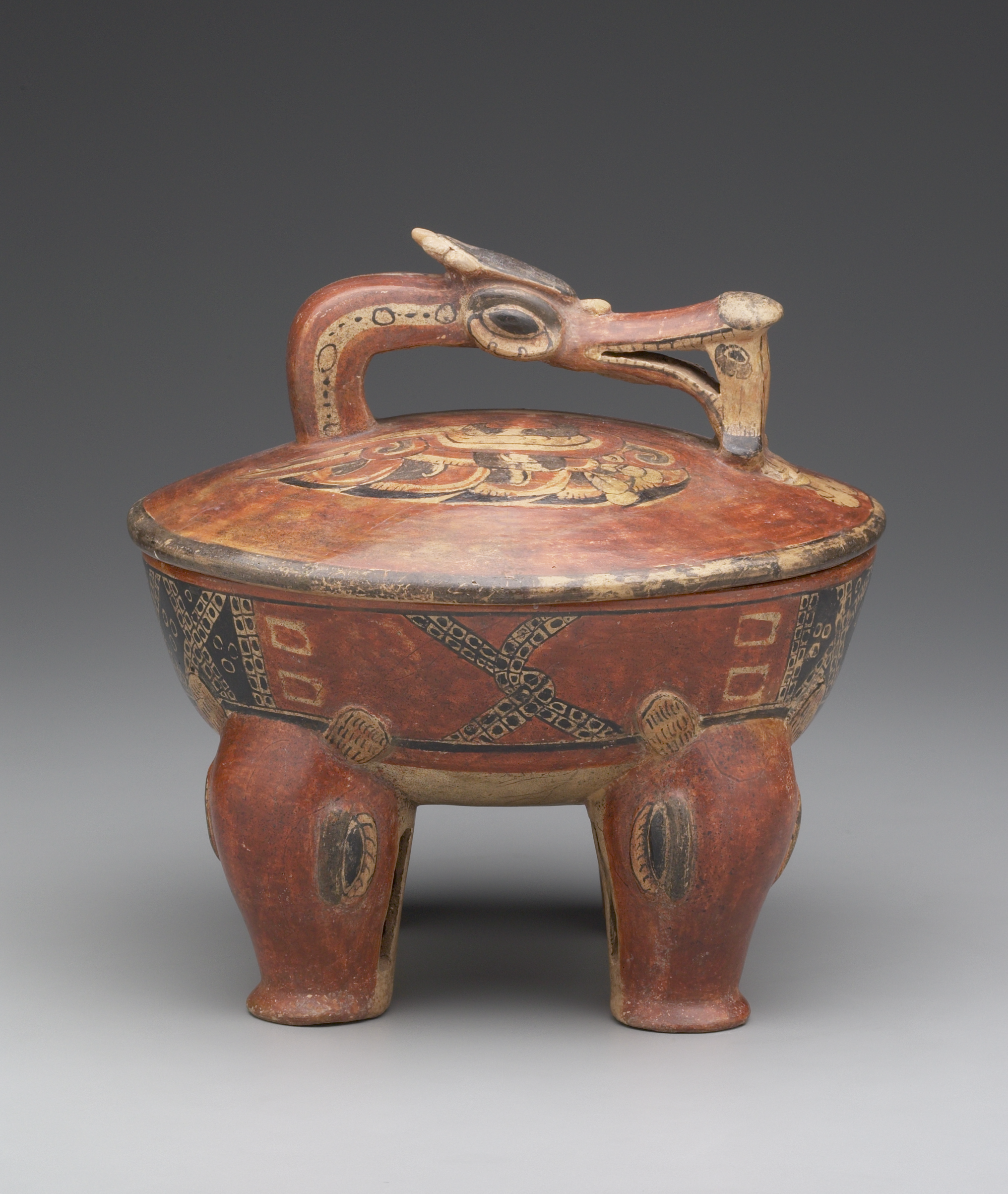
Decoration in paint and modeled clay covers all available space on this lidded bowl, created by a Maya artist in about A.D. 250–400. This "Lidded Vessel with Peccaries, Bird, and Fish" reflects an intersection of different animals unlikely to have co-existed, perhaps reflecting livestock (e.g. peccaries) as well as perishable trade in the Early Classic Period.

Research suggests that ancient Maya economic systems were much more complex; a hierarchy was likely a framework that supported a diversity of distributive networks or spheres signifying varying degrees of economic involvement on the part of a number of sites or communities.

Petrofabric markers are used to classify Mesoamerican ceramics by their main elements - every community has a unique recipe, every ceramicist has to mix in their ingredients, while the same vessel shapes give a sense of the potting community. Archeologists must often rely on technical, stylistic, thematic and formal similarities, though one aspect that is often untraceable is its provenance. Instead, the ceramics represent distinct artistic traditions, cataloged through diagnostic geographic and temporal attributes.

Within the Belize River Valley region archeologist Persis Clarkson discovered that at least two different distributional patterns of trade existed in the Late Classic for local ceramics. One sphere of trade exhibited a uniform distribution of "calcite petrofabrics" whereby it was present at every site studied in the Valley region. A second, sphere of trade was identified as more exclusive for the distribution of "granite petrofabrics". These were both determined to locally made but the difference in distribution, based on their prevalence among the various sites, suggest that participation in distribution spheres for sites in the Belize Valley differed depending on their scale, complexity, and access to resources.

Furthermore, evidence of ash-based ceramic in the area suggest that these communities were involved in a wider sphere of economic exchange at some scale, as these "volcanic petrofabrics" were likely an extra-regional import. Petrographic and contextual evidence also suggest that these petrofabrics were traded as fully formed vessels rather than the importation of raw ash to the valley region or through local sourcing of the volcanic ash. Importation of raw ash is unlikely as long travel distances to ash sources would have been necessary yet no trace of existence in ethnoarchaeological studies.

These findings are consistent with the existence of economic relations of greater magnitude and complexity than have been traditionally assumed. This archeological study of sites in the Belize River Valley pointed to participation in economic spheres of different scales suggesting a highly complex economy: intraregional, regional, and extra-regional. The data also implies the presence of regional markets or a type of redistributive system by which locally made pottery as well as regional imports circulated.

== Materials ==
The Maya had an extremely rich variety of resources that made up its currency. Cacao beans, marine shells, maize, chili peppers, manioc, amaranth, palms, vanilla, avocado, tobacco, and hundreds more resources were readily available for intensification and eventual trade throughout the Maya groups, with each resource rising and falling in value depending on its rarity. Agriculture began around 3000 B.C with maize and beans in a slash and burn, then individual gardens, and eventually raised terraces throughout Maya communities. Furthermore, metallurgy was not used in Mesoamerica until about A.D 600. Obsidian, jade, and other rocks and minerals were used in the production of lithic tools.

Among the most important goods that circulate within the long-distance trade network were salt, obsidian, jade, turquoise, and quetzal feathers. The large market centers within major Mayan cities acted as redistribution centers in which merchants could obtain goods to sell in more minor cities. Mostly subsistence items were traded within major city market center. Meanwhile, items for the elite class such as rare feathers, spondylus and jadeite were commissioned by the elite class.

=== Jadeite ===
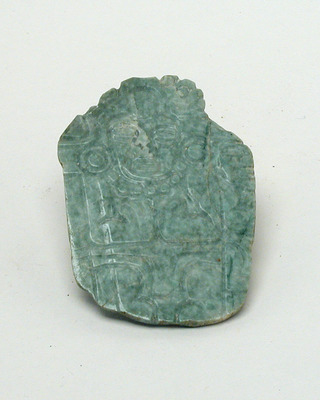
A jadeite plaque from the Maya highlands (Guatemala), where there was known to be an abundance of jadeite. This is from the Early Classic Period.

The only geological sources of Mesoamerican jade was in the Maya area, specifically the Middle Motagua River Valley of eastern highland Guatemala. Because of its natural occurrence in the Maya region, jade understandably played a major role in Classic Maya economics and held religious significance. Recent fieldwork in the Middle Motagua River Valley as well as other areas have documented the remnants of jade workshops and the existence of long-distance trade of both raw and worked jade during the Classic Maya period. At this time, the stone was symbolically associated with agriculture and morality, often carved to signify the world center, or the maize god, or to immortals ancestors especially for placing into burial chambers. The underlying meanings of Maya jade can be traced to earlier Olmec culture, making this stone an enduring bridge between traditions of the Formative and later Classic periods.

The presence of "monumental construction programs" in the jadeite-bearing region of the Middle Montagua River Valley indicates some level of elite management, however, this is no longer considered in isolation; further excavations of the site points to significant evidence of jade-production activities of non-working households as well. The organization of luxury goods production is considered more nuanced than previously believed. This calls into question the assumed, simple dichotomy between wealth and utilitarian goods production, further complicating our understanding of these Pre-Columbian economies. Recognizing the instrumental role that both elite and non‐elite households played as production units of utilitarian and wealth goods is essential for any reconstruction of the organization of ancient Maya craft production systems. Nonetheless, there is evidence of regional networks of trade by the mere fact that this type of jadeite has been found having been exported throughout the Maya and larger Mesoamerican and Caribbean area; it has also been illustrated in the pottery documented from these settlements. This trade is exemplified by imported Usulutan ceramics that were found at the site of Vargas IIA, just over a kilometer south of Guaytan. It is characteristic of the Late Preclassic and is a locally made Usulutan-style imitation vessels, thus exhibiting an awareness of these cultures and their associated styles, that can only be functioned by trade.

Studies suggest that evidence of short-occupation settlements in the rugged, upper valleys may be associated with an increased demand for jadeite, which was unavailable further downstream.

Mayanist Erick Rochette uses the production of jadeite to exhibit the nuances of interaction between elite and non-elite in a Mayan context. He argues that this particular raw material was abundantly available in this Middle Montagua River Valley region and would be extremely difficult to control, said to "appear in pockets throughout the valley" from the surrounding mountains This holds today, as it maintains its legacy as a consistent source of jadeite in the region. Without this direct control of production, or rather access to the raw jadeite complicates our understanding of elite/non-elite relations in the Middle Motagua Valley.

The current evidence suggests that the production of jadeite had little to do with local hierarchy, while also maintaining a role on some scale at every single site that was excavated in the Valley. That said, the procurement may not have been effectively managed by the elite. However, there was a clear hierarchy in the final products such that the skill of artisans was able to stratify production such that the distribution of most intricate and uniquely crafted jadeite could still be restricted by the elite, perhaps even crafted as part of "sponsored production arrangements" by elites. Functionally, the jadeite artifacts that were found in the Middle Motagua Valley have accumulated jadeite beads that would likely have been used by the elite to quantify their social status. This would have been considered “simple" and "low‐value” but was also found in households of the non‐elite in the Maya lowlands, perhaps evidencing early forms of regional currency. This would complement economic theory that currency occurs when a material is freely accessible to all, can be quantified and is hence widely accepted. However, this hypothesis is still primitive, and has not been met with a clear consensus.

=== Obsidian ===
The broad-scale distribution and almost universal-use wear of Obsidian pieces found at Northern Maya sites suggest that it was not obtained exclusively by elite redistribution to trickle down through ranked kin groups; rather it circulated within the site through direct exchanges or marketplace transactions. Although its importation may have been controlled by elite middlemen, we can safely conclude that obsidian was not treated simply as a wealth item inasmuch as most of the obsidian blades that entered the site were used and found in middens and other ordinary household contexts.

== See also ==
- Economy of Prehispanic Mexico
- Trade in Maya civilization
