= Economy of Prehispanic Mexico =

The first forms of economic organization in Pre-Hispanic Mexico were agriculture and hunting activities. The first people who inhabited the Mexican lands and part of Central America were great builders and later on creators of some of the most advanced civilizations of that time. The economy of that time, however, was based on the commercial activities, the division of society into classes, and later the importance that was generated in the economy by the so-called Tlatoani of the Aztecs.

== Pre-classic Period ==
=== The Pre-classic period in Mesoamerica (2500 BC – 200 AD) ===
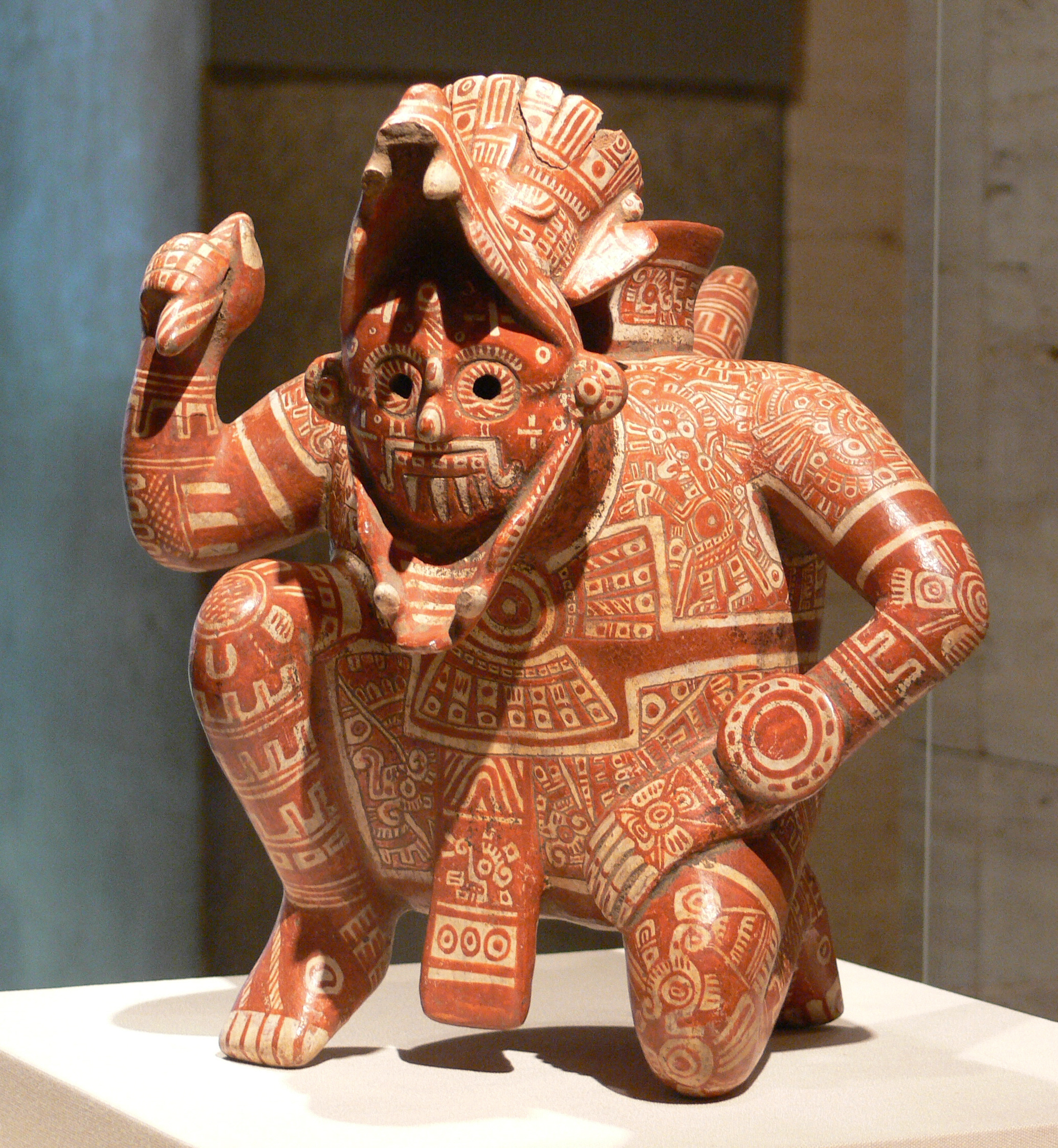
Pre-Columbian art figurines

During this period there was an increase in the population and sedentarism, causing the origin of complex societies with intensive cropping systems. Some researchers said that agriculture forced societies to adopt sedentary lifestyle; others think that the reason was due to the increase in the population since agriculture could supply more food than hunting.

The ancient cultures which developed during that period tended to manufacture and improve ceramics. Ceramic was very important because it allowed a better transportation of materials as well as aiding in the development of newer ovens to create special handcrafts such as female figurines.

=== The early Pre-classic (2500 BC – 1200 BC) ===
In this period began the settlement of ancient societies, groups of small villages or small houses inhabited by large families. However, there was still not a social structure until the middle and late Preclassic period. In agriculture, societies that settled in states such as Puebla, Tlaxcala and Tabasco started to domesticate wild plants such as corn, amaranth, pumpkin, chili pepper and green tomato. On the other hand, in the peninsula of Yucatan and Mexico, they had not yet domesticated plants.

=== The Middle Pre-classic Period (1200 BC – 400 BC) ===
During this period, society was divided into classes and each had different activities. People from the upper classes or elite groups were dedicated to the organization of commerce as well as religious ceremonies, while those in the lower classes were mainly focused on agriculture and the construction of cities.

Long-distance trade between the ancient cultures of Mesoamerica was increasing, but above all, regional specialization was a key factor during this period. Trade was also important in relations between allies and vassals. However, long-distance trade was limited by the means of transportation. Some cultures used tlamemeh porters to carry goods on their backs, with relays set up at specific intervals.

=== Civilizations of the middle Pre-classic (1200 BC – 400 BC) ===
==== Olmecs ====
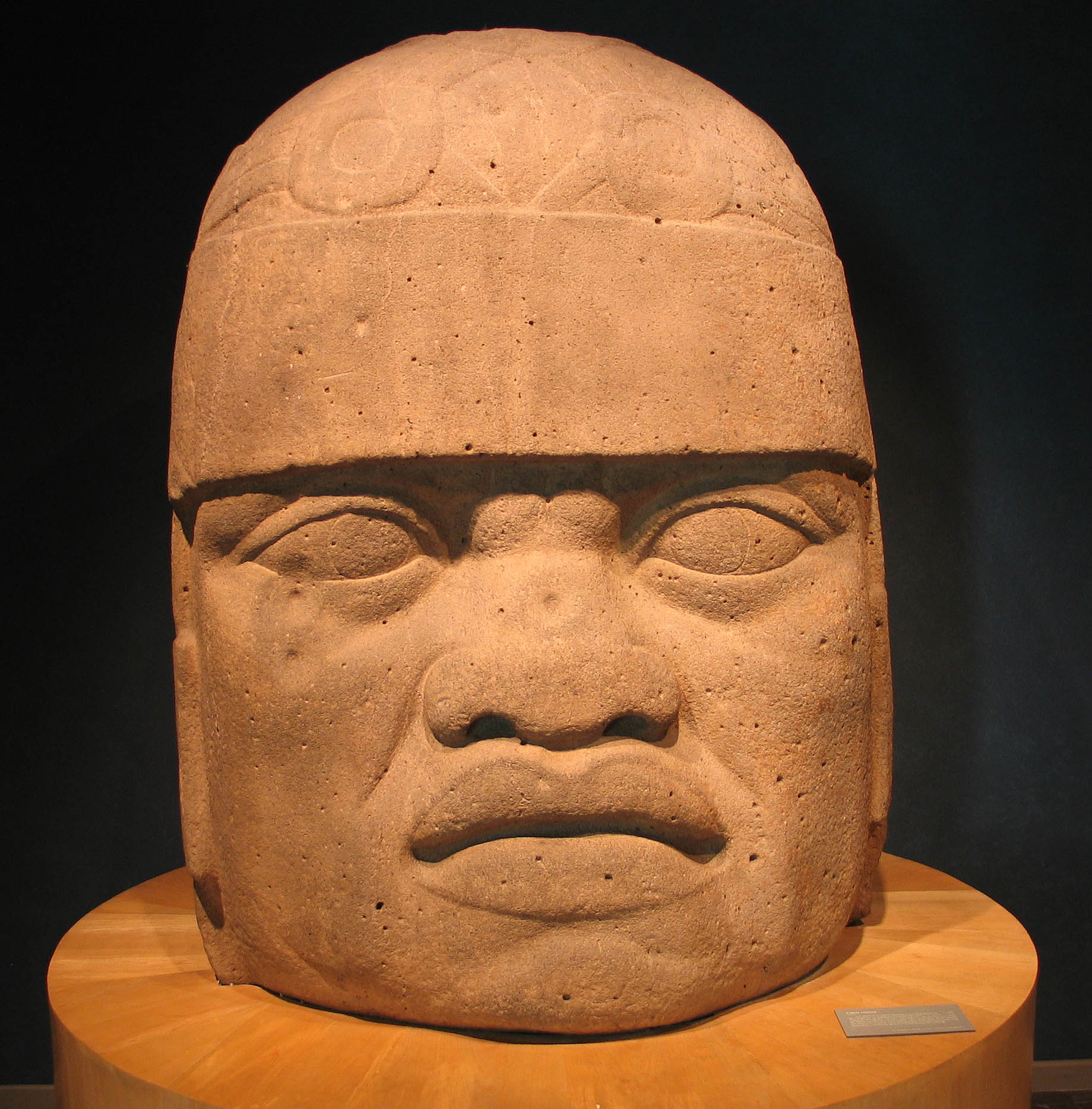
Olmec Head (Museo Nacional de Antropología)

The Olmecs may be considered the mother culture of the Pre-Columbian civilizations. The Olmecs regional center was San Lorenzo (1150 - 900 BC) and even though their economic activity in this center is still unknown, obsidian workshops have been found. The second capital of the Olmecs was La Venta (900 – 500 BC) where, due to its location and easy access to natural resources, took place many important activities such as fishing, hunting and overall, agriculture.

==== Mayas ====
The Maya civilization based their economy mainly on the agriculture trade, but hunting of wild animals and collecting forest products were also important activities. Maya agriculture was also based on harvesting corn. The population increment during the early and late pre-classic forced the rulers to find alternatives for high-productive harvesting. Intensive methods were introduced that made use of irrigation channels and special techniques associated with hydraulic engineering. They were also trading products like salt, seashells, obsidian, jade and Quetzal feathers, with other nearby regions.

==== Aztecs ====
The Aztec economy was based on agriculture and trade. Agriculture provided a great variety of fruits and vegetables, such as tomatoes, chili peppers, pumpkins, and beans, necessary to feed the high number of inhabitants in the empire. The Aztec agrarian economy is considered one of the most evolved of Indigenous America, only surpassed by the system implemented in the Andean area. The products that could not be obtained in the Valley of Mexico were acquired through trading with other regions by merchants, who traveled long distances. In the market of Tenochtitlan, all kinds of merchandise were traded, included product from the Pacific and Atlantic ocean, both of them 500 km away from the Aztec capital. In order to trade "primitive coins" were used such as cacao seeds and Quetzal feathers. The Aztec economic system based on this simple way of trading was highly efficient and maintained great stability and ensured the welfare of the majority of the population of the empire.

==== Toltecs ====
Among the first economic activities of the Toltec culture is agriculture, through the cultivation of chili, corn and beans as well as maguey, the raw material for the alcoholic beverage called 'pulque', and cotton. Later on, they specialized in other fields such as handicrafts made of cotton, as well as practices of trade and tribute. They started to create 'monopolies' that held back the trade with other civilizations and regions under their authority in order to ensure their own economic and patrimonial wealth. The tribute system was something very characteristic of this culture, it consisted of the request and payment of scarce or new product to the tribes or regions that were conquered. Similarly, merchants that needed to cross their territories had to pay these tributes. That way Toltecs managed to control and administrate all their territories and took great advantage of their commercial areas and natural resources.

==== Tlaxcala ====
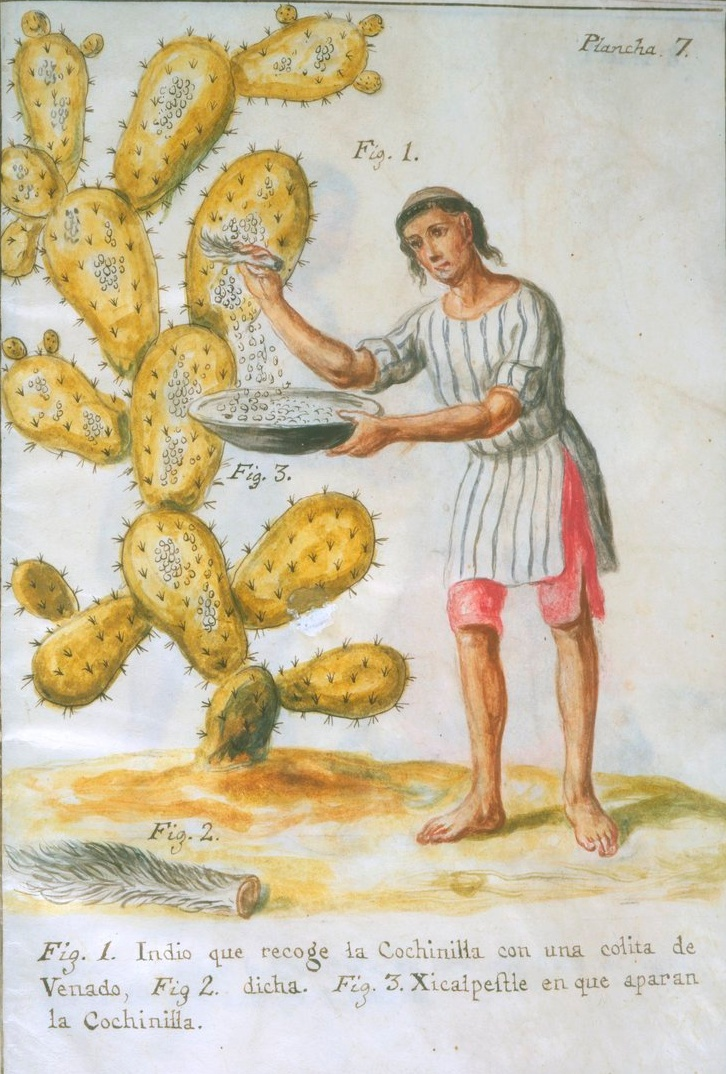
Indian collecting woodlouse

In Tlaxcala, they specialized in trading corn and woodlouse. This type of insect was very appreciated because it was used to elaborate red color paint which was later used in textiles. In exchange for those goods, they received products like cocoa, cotton, chili, vanilla, feathers, tobacco, wax, honey and maguey. The market of Ocotero was the main commercial center where, according to some authors, more than 20 thousand went every day to trade for products such as cocoa and cotton blankets brought by the Mayans. Due to their bad relationship with Tlaxcala, the Aztecs tried to prevent their trading with the regions nearby the Gulf of Mexico.

==== Mixtecs ====
In Mesoamerica, there was a very limited number of domesticated animals. The turkey and the ancient dog called Xoloitzcuintle are two examples, both of them were sources of meat consumed on a small scale in the indigenous societies. The basis of the Mixtecs economy was not only agriculture but also, hunting, the collection of materials and fishing to complement their diet and to cover other needs. One of the advantages they had was its great diversity of microclimates, reason why many of the manors that developed in that area were self-sufficient. The inhabitants were incorporated into a wide network of trading among other Mesoamerican civilizations. In addition to the fruits and woodlouse, they were trading with precious metals and handicrafts. From very early dates they were integrated as producers of minerals, especially magnetite. It has been proven that during the Middle Pre-classic period the red ceramic was a product of trade with the Olmecs of the Gulf of Mexico.

==== Valley of Mexico ====
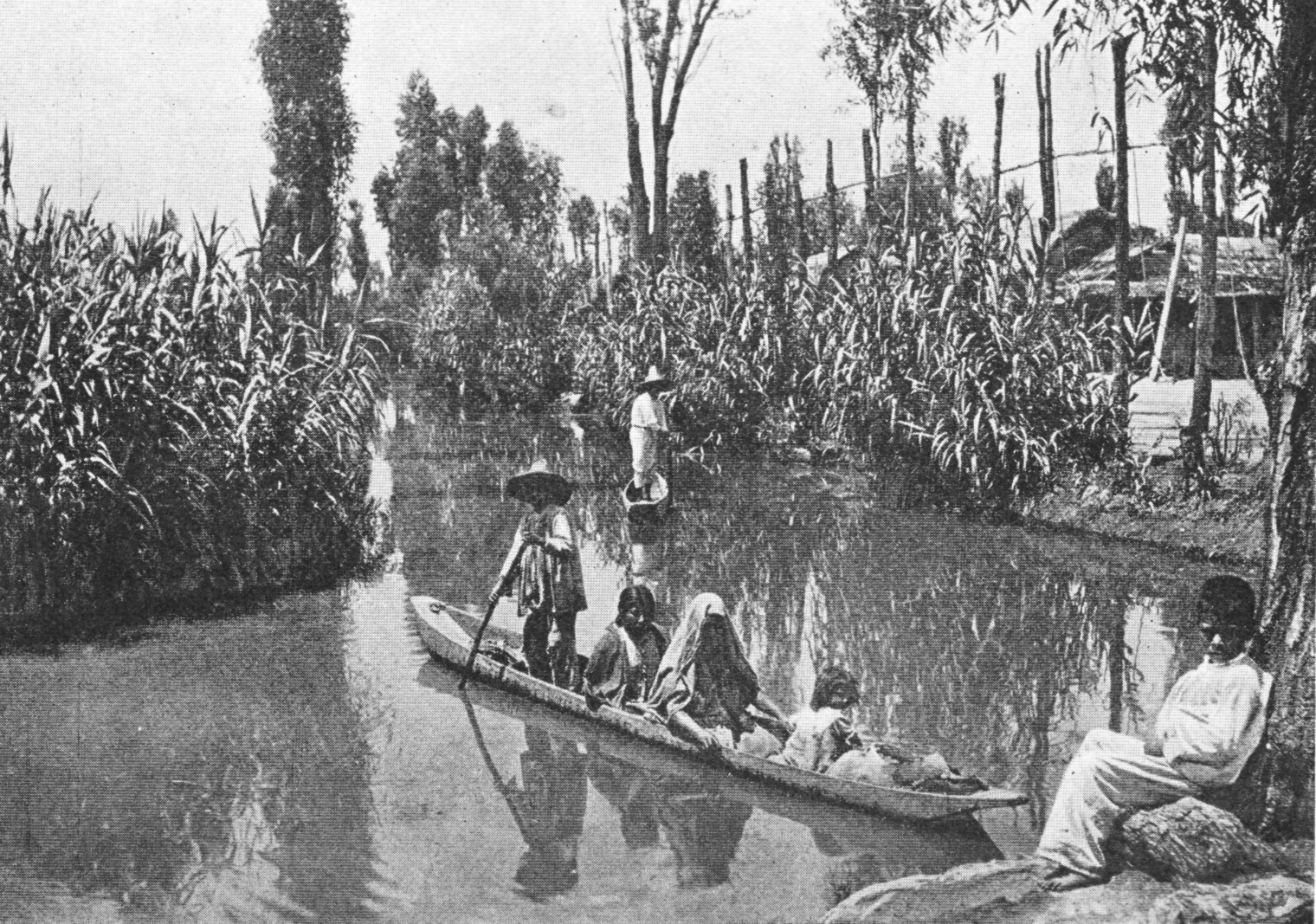
Chinampas

Many capitals emerged in the Valley of Mexico such as Tlacopaya, Tatilco, and Coapexco; also these capitals were in charge of the trading routes. In those routes took place trade of different goods like asphalt, cinnabar, quartz, obsidian and, pyrite. Researchers have found that approximately in the year 1000 BC there was a great development in of hydraulic systems in semiarid regions, with the use of the chinampa, many cultures could have a better use of the land.

In the Valley of Oaxaca, there was an increment in the population and a better-structured society. The most important period of that region was San Jose Mogote, which had several adobe and stone platforms and was surrounded by many villages that produced different products like salt or were specialized in the production of handcrafts.

==== Trade of civilizations during the middle Pre-classic ====
Some examples of the most important places for trade and the product they were trading are the following:

- Cuenca de México and Guatemalan altiplano – Obsidian
- Valley of Morelos – Kaolinite
- Valley of Oaxaca –Magnetite
- Pacific Coast of Chiapas – Cocoa
- Maya civilization – Quetzal feathers

=== The late Pre-classic (400 BC – 200 AD) ===
During this period there was an increment in the construction of buildings, roads, hydraulic systems used for water storage and drainage. Also, the creation of chinampa's and terraces allowed a better production of food which generated an increment in the population and the strengthening of centralized government. Later cities were abandoned searching for other capitals such as Teotihuacán, Cholula or Cuicuilco which were richer and had a stronger centralized government.

==== Cuicuilco ====
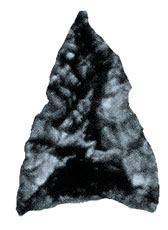
Arrowhead made of obsidian

Cuicuilco was the most important region in the Pre-classic, built on a very fertile land surrounded by volcanoes, among them, the Xitle volcano. It had a population of 53.000 people which was one of the most populated cities after Teotihuacán. Unfortunately, due to the eruption caused by the volcano Xitle in 100 BC a huge part of the population died.

Another natural disaster occurred in 1 AD, the eruption of the volcano Popocatépetl caused the population of capital cities liked Chacaltzingo, Atlantepec, Cuajimalpa, Amaluacan, etc. to move to other capitals such as Cholula, Totimehuacan, and Teotihuacán. Thus those capitals became megalopolis which had an exponential growth in economy and culture.

Researchers affirm that the Pyramid of the Sun and Pyramid of the Moon in Teotihuacán were expected to be finished after two centuries, however, with the arrival of more people to work, the project was finished later. The main economic activity in Teotihuacán was agriculture and trade, as well as the tributes that they received from other cultures that were under their domain.

Agriculture in Teotihuacán had innovations such as the construction of terraces, chinampa and irrigation channels. Teotihuacán exported mainly cocoa, cotton, and obsidian. Near of Teotihuacán were large amounts of obsidian, a stone used to elaborate knives, arrowheads or sculptures; this allowed to trade obsidian with all the civilizations of Mesoamerica. In the Valley of Oaxaca, the great city of Monte Albán reached 14000 inhabitants (200 BC- 250 AD) and they were trading with Teotihuacán crops like corn, beans, and avocado for obsidian, jade, pottery, and salt.

== Classical period (200 AD – 900 AD) ==
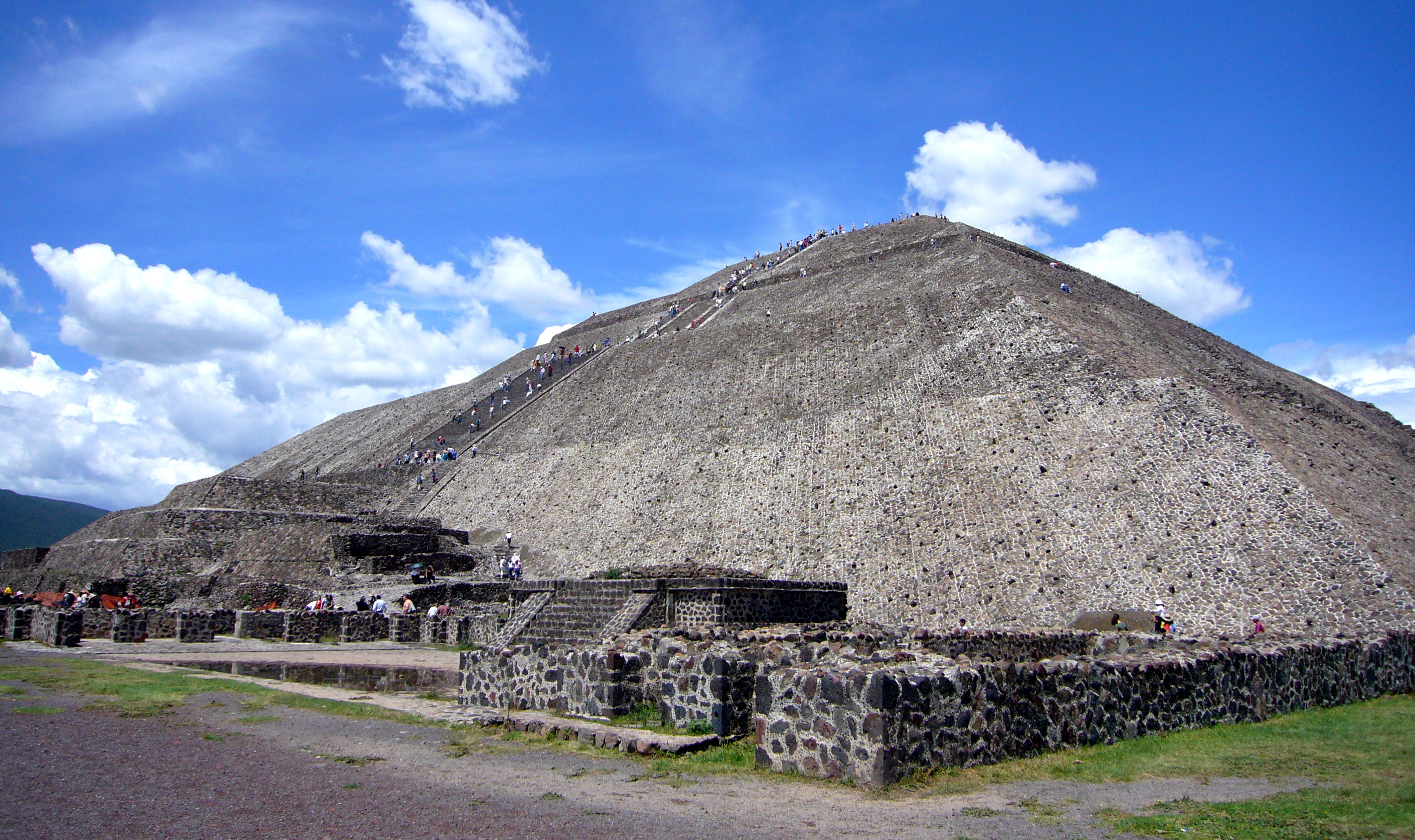
Pyramid of the Sun in Teotihuacán

This period is characterized by the growth of many civilizations that built large cities and improved their techniques in agriculture, goldsmithing, and ceramics. From the year 400 AD, an increment in the efficiency of agricultural techniques achieved the transformation of the societies of that time, which besides being administrative and religious centers, served as production complexes and shopping centers. Throughout the history of the sedentary civilizations of ancient Mexico there was an important trade, especially of durable goods: specifically, raw materials and finished artifacts that were used in work processes, in war, and in rituals. Teotihuacán, the most important city of the period, had a strong influence throughout Mesoamerica, not because of its economic or military capacity, or because of its particular organization, but because of its role as producer and distributor of goods for exchange. The Maya civilization also played an important role in the Mesoamerican economy, with markets in a growing number of Mayan cities. Cities of the Altiplano had markets in permanent squares, which were attended by officials to resolve disputes, enforce standards, and collect taxes. However, the city that dominated trading was Teotihuacán, who traded with places as far away as New Mexico or Guatemala.

Other important economic activities of Teotihuacán were the handicraft production (pottery and obsidian manufacture) and the long-distance trade. In both cases, there was an important specialization and, due to the demand, it was necessary to modify techniques to produce massively (for example, through the use of molds and modeling without a lathe in the case of pottery).

Teotihuacán political and economic hegemony was based on two foreign products, over which they had a monopoly: the "orange pottery ", produced in the Valley of Puebla-Tlaxcala, and the mineral deposits in the nowadays state of Hidalgo. The existence of trade routes and redistributing centers between the great urban center of Teotihuacán and practically the rest of the Mesoamerican regions is undeniable. In Matacapán, located five kilometers east of San Andrés de Tuxtla, Veracruz, it has been postulated as a Teotihuacan enclave that operated as a redistribution of merchandise of the great city.

== Post-classic period (900 AD – 1521 AD) ==
=== The early Post-classic (900 AD – 1168 AD) ===
The changes that occurred in this period did not bring significant transformations to the great civilizations. Approximately 80% of the population of Teotihuacán left the city. New forms of colonization were established, as well as alliances between manors to consolidate certain routes and commercial flows. The war was a constant in the last centuries of Mesoamerica, generating instability in the development in a significant way.

By the year 900 AD Teotihuacán had been abandoned and Tula became the main urban center of the Valley of Mexico. The nearby rivers allowed to create a network of irrigation channels that facilitated feeding their inhabitants. The power of Tula was supported by the broad and strong network with other civilizations, also having cities that were under their control.

=== Social classes ===
Back then societies had no social structure, all families lived under the same conditions, the only one that stood out was the Tlatoani. There were three types of workers: landlords, land workers, and slaves. The landlords work other people's land but were not required to remain in perpetuity in those lands. The land workers dealt with patrimonial lands and lived nearby but they had to give most of the production of these lands away; also they didn't have land of their own and were obliged to remain permanently in those lands. Slavery was not important from the economic point of view, but there were two types of slaves: the domestic ones and those that were used for sacrifice.

The teuctli or tecutli, second rank of the nobility (below the Tlatoani), were old men, rich and prominent or sons of warriors who gained some distinction in the war or shown a lot of courage; it was necessary that they possess numerous assets, since they had to distribute many of them when they reached that rank, some merchants also had the same distinction. The rest of the population received the name of macehuales or macahualtin. They were in charge to help people from upper classes and they worked the land. Their way of dressing was very simple, without ornaments, because the costumes denoted the social class they belong to. The basic social unit was the family: a group of families formed a calpulli or neighborhood, their importance was not just in the family but also in military, politics, and religion. Each calpulli had its own god, temple, and particular ceremonies.
