= Cuca (Maya site) =

Archaeological site in Yucatán, Mexico

Coordinates: 20°55′35″N 89°24′43″W

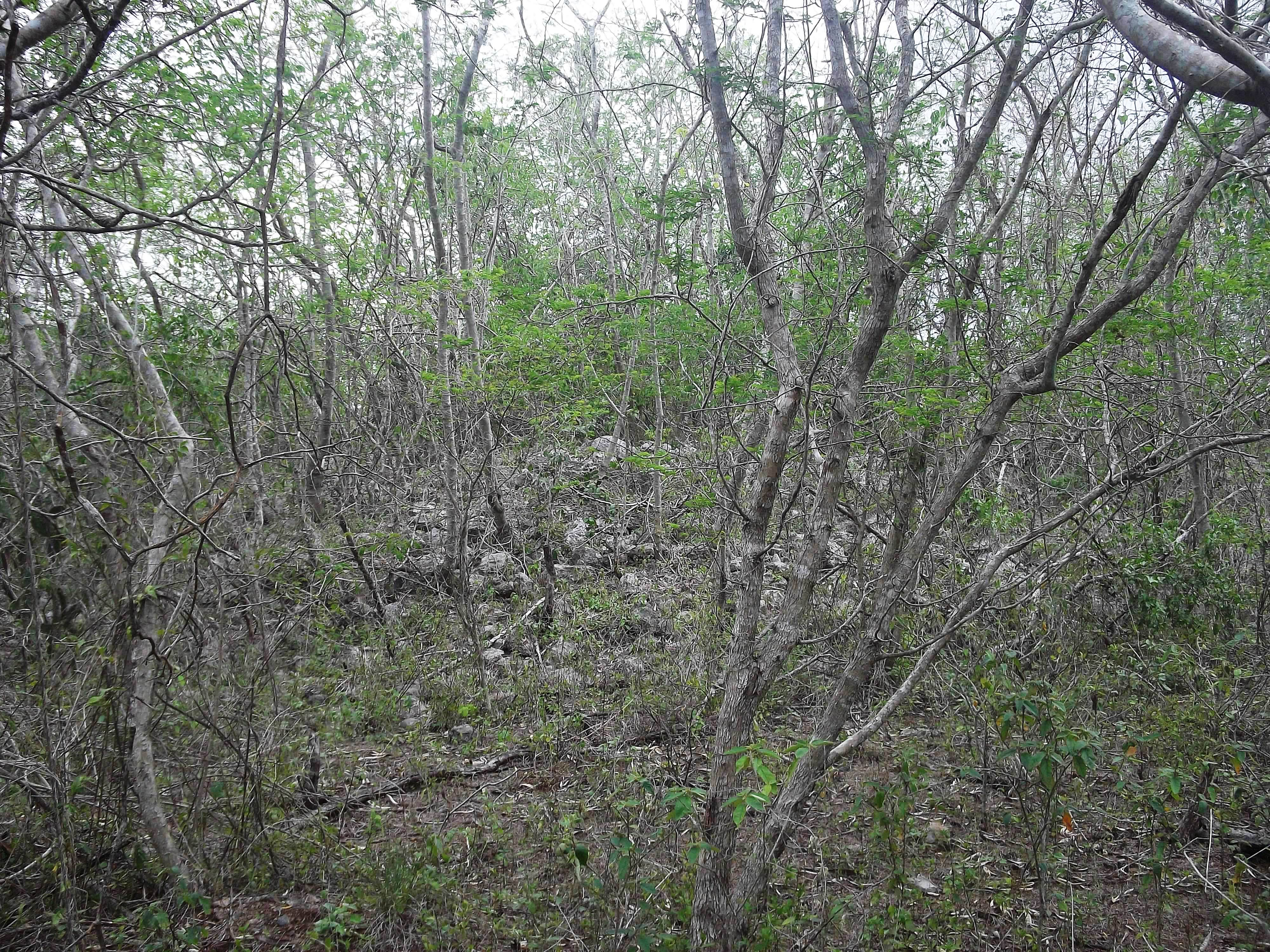
Structure of the archaeological site of Cuca, Yucatán.

Cuca is the name of a Mayan civilization pre-Columbian archaeological site located near the town of Tixpéhual, in Yucatán, Mexico.

The site occupies an area of approximately 10 ha, where dozens of structures and their remains are scattered, surrounded by a low wall. Among these vestiges, the existence of a mound containing a relatively important temple whose walls can be seen pictorial residues is recorded.

The site is crossed by a sacbé that would have united in the postclassic period (Mesoamerican chronology to which the site corresponds) the population of Tixpéhual with the old city of T'Hó (currently the city of Mérida, capital of the state of Yucatán).

== Gallery ==
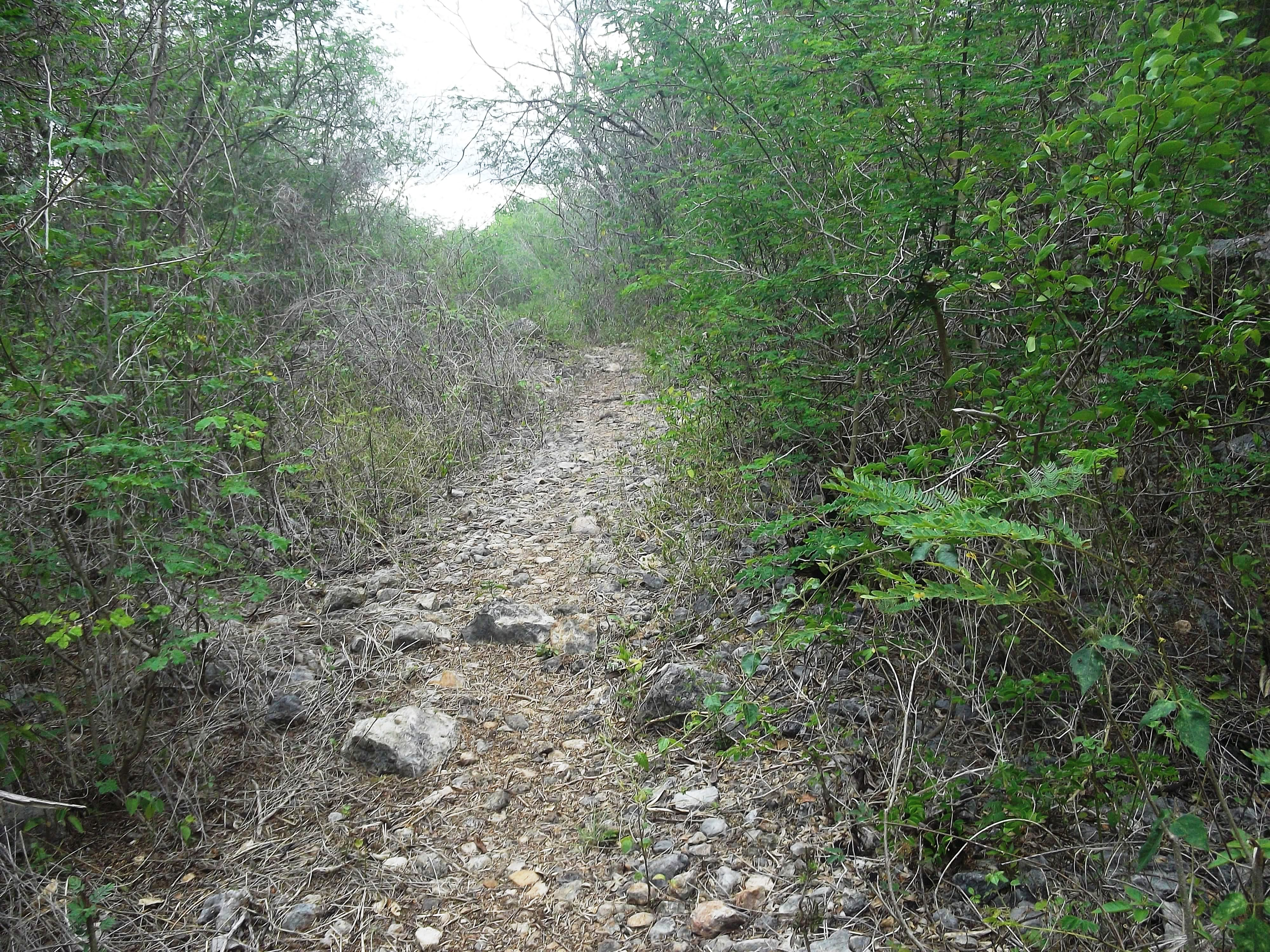
Cuca Mayan vestiges.

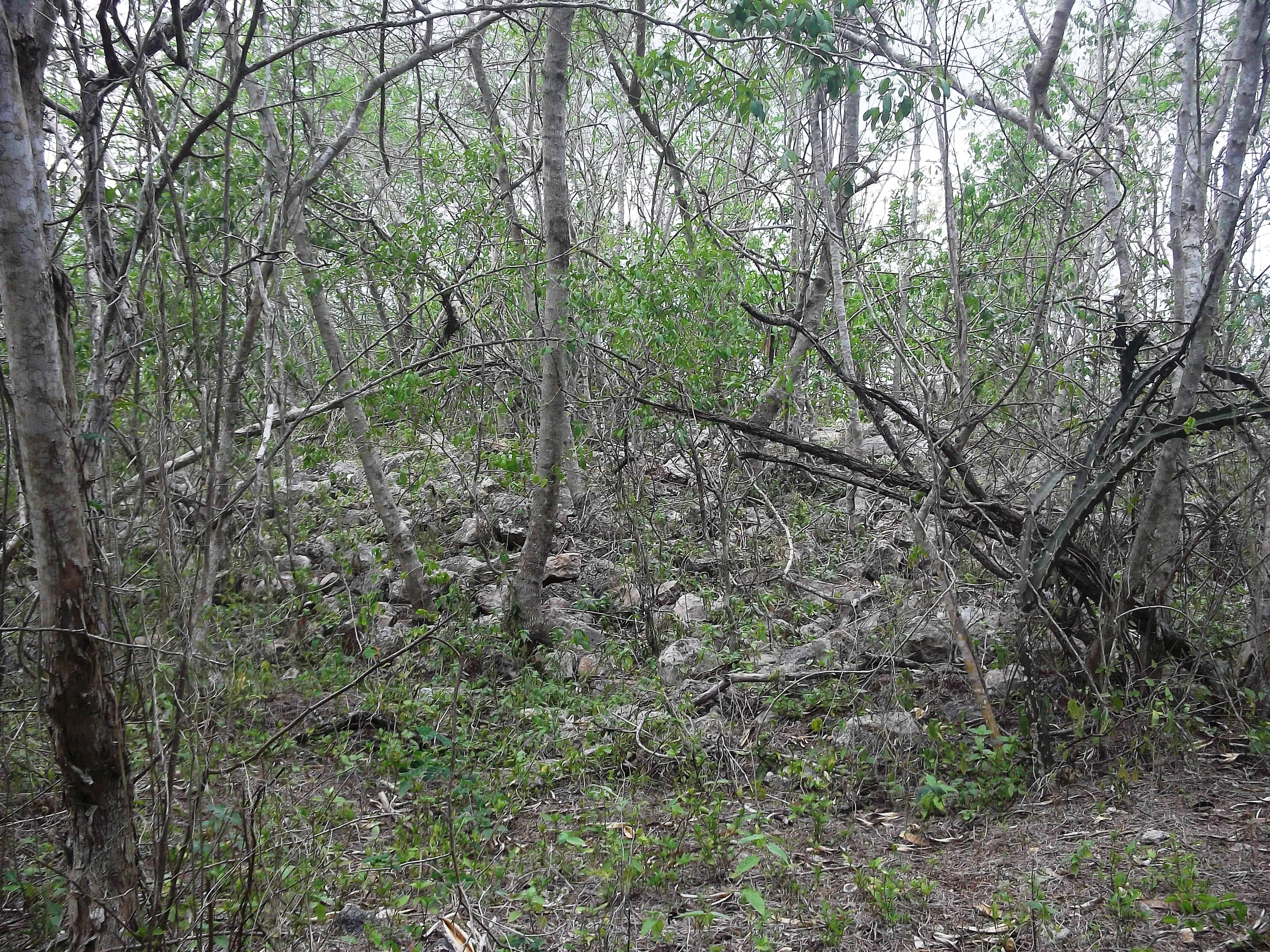
Cuca Mayan vestiges.

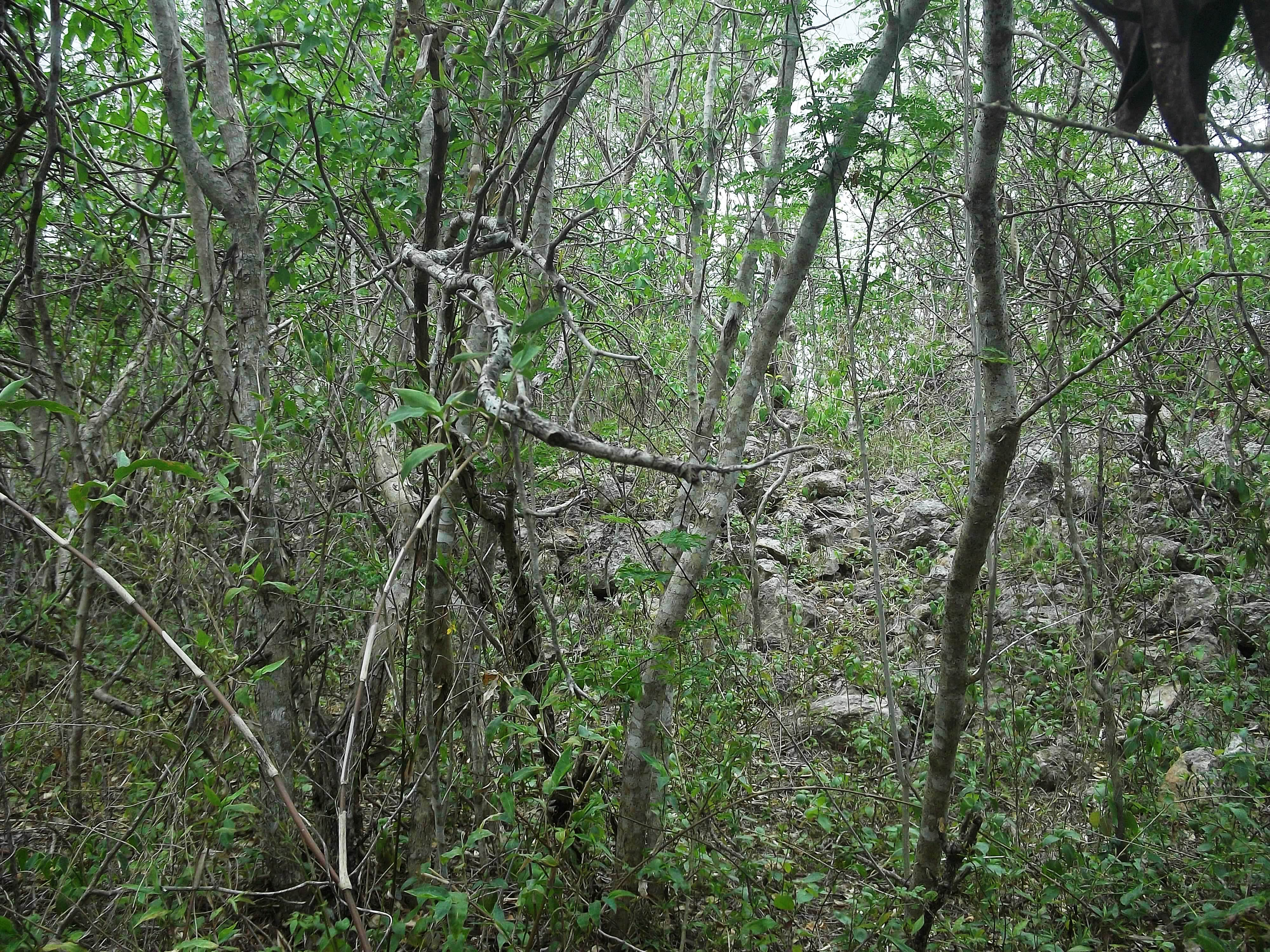
Cuca Mayan vestiges.

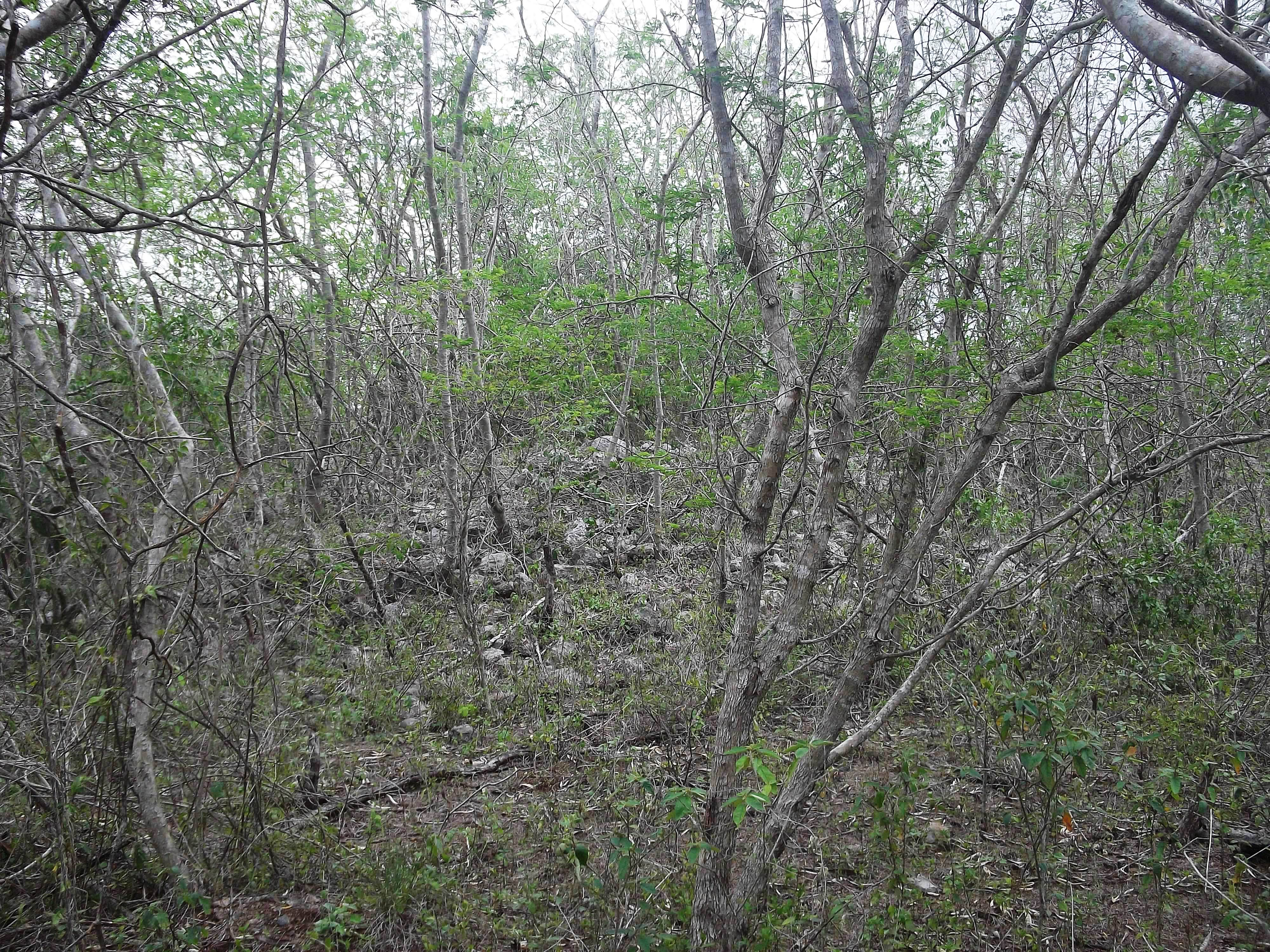
Cuca Mayan vestiges.

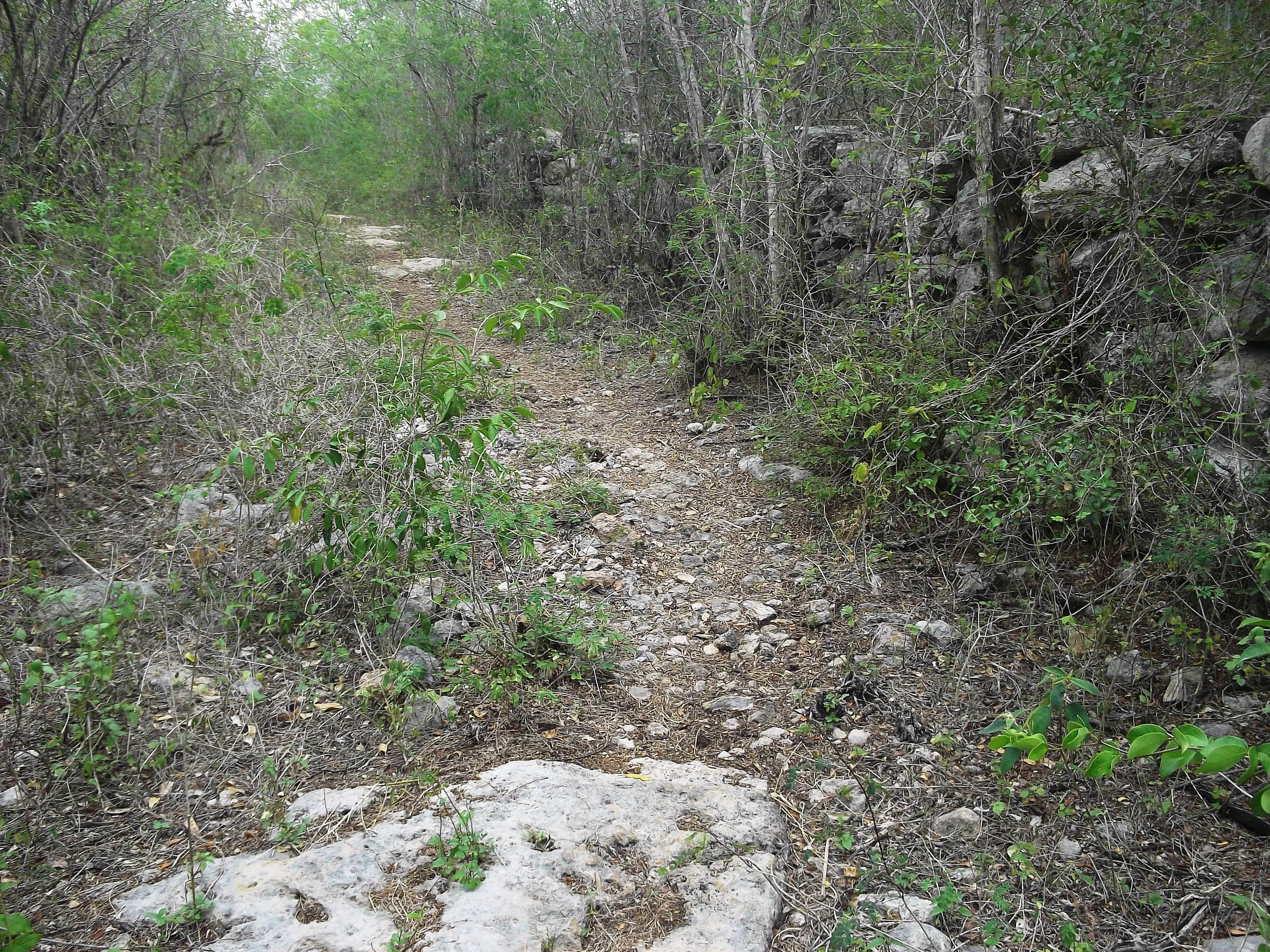
Cuca Mayan vestiges.

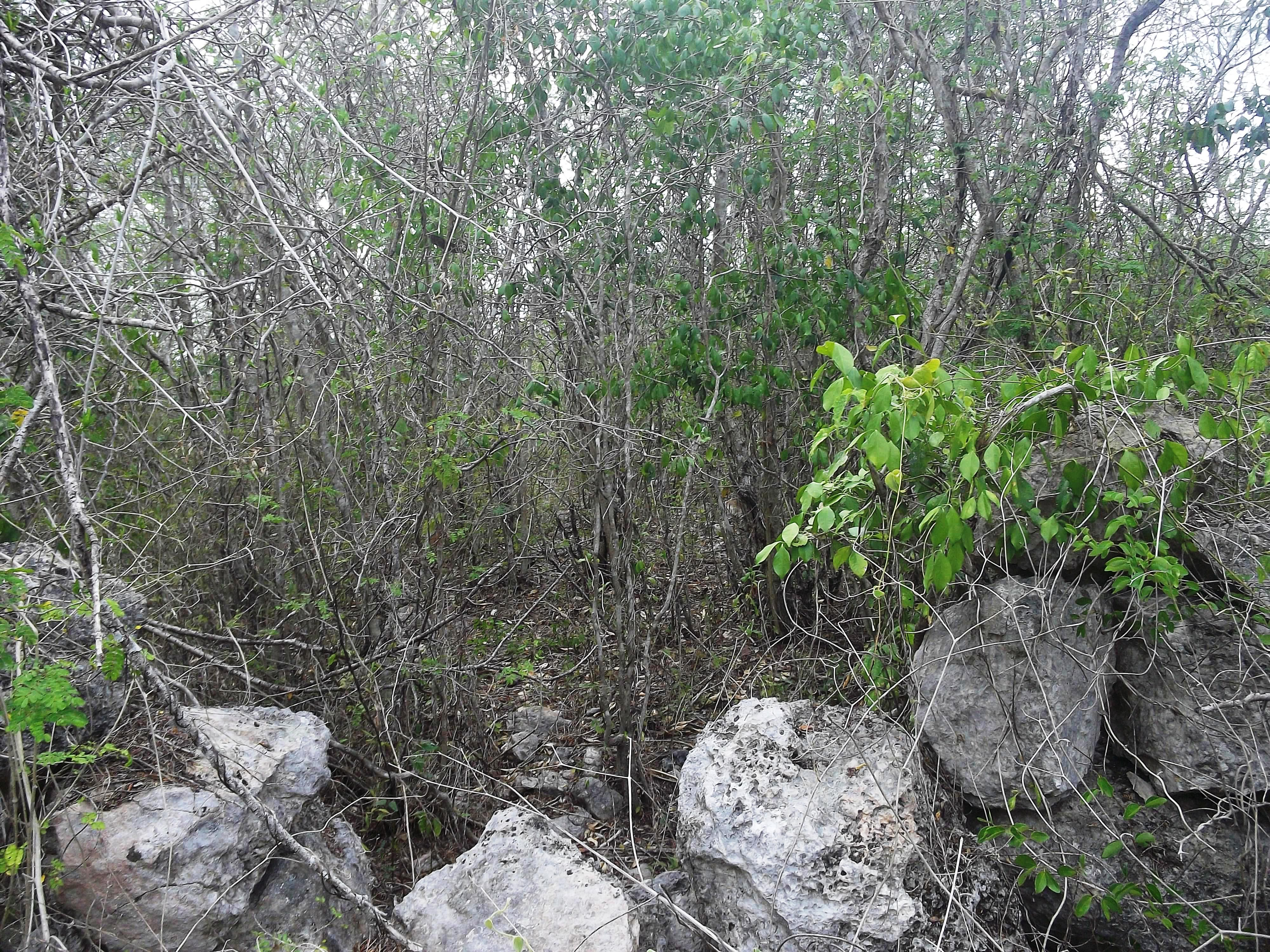
Cuca Mayan vestiges.

== See also ==
- Town and farm of Cucá in Tixpéhual, Yucatán
