= Hocabá-Homún =

Kuchkabal Hocabá-Homún
- 1443–1547
- Kuchkabals of Yucatan after 1461.
- Capital: Hocabá
- Common languages: Official language: Yucatec
- Religion: Maya religion
- Government: Monarchy
- Halach Uinik
- Historical era: Post Classic Period / Early Modern
  - Established: 1443
  - Disestablished: 1547
Preceded by	Succeeded by
League of Mayapan	New Spain

Hocabá-Homún, Hokabá-Homún or Hocabá was the name of a Maya Kuchkabal of the northwestern Yucatán Peninsula, before the arrival of the Spanish conquistadors in the sixteenth century.

== Etymology ==
The name Hocabá-Homún is derived from the name of the two main cities of the country, in the fifteenth and sixteenth centuries the two cities were joined into one urban area. Hocabá (Hó'kabá in Yucatec) means five (Hó) earth (kab) water (á).

== History ==
=== Pre-Independence ===
See also Toltec Empire See also League of Mayapan

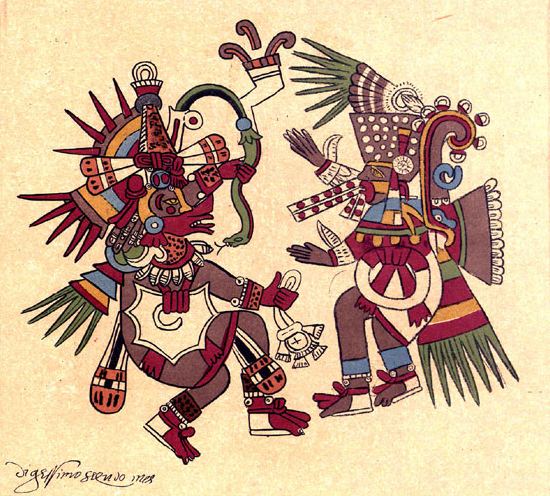
Quetzalcoatl and Tezcatlipoca, Quetzalcoatl is a Mexica god related to Ce Acatl Topiltzin

During the ninth century, the Maya civilization went into decline from overpopulation as part of the Maya collapse, The Yucatán Peninsula was divided into several different polities. Around 930 Ce Acatl Topiltzin, Tlatoani of the Toltec Empire conquered Yucatán. Toltec control over the area only lasted forty or fifty years. Around 970 Toltec power began to wane and the peninsula was separated into city states again. In 987 Ah Mekat Tutul Xiu, ruler of Uxmal and subsequently Puuc joined the cities of Mayapan, Uxmal, and Chichen Itza into a confederation called the League of Mayapan. Over the next twenty years the league grew quickly incorporating the Cocom as then fourth member of the confederation. Izamal was the fifth city to join, one of its tributaries, Tecoh, was conquered by Kʼakʼupakal one of the four k’ul kokom (rulers) of Chichen Itza, as well as the head of the Itza military. Yawahal Cho Chak and Hun Pik Tok May were two of the other k’ul kokom.

The League of Mayapan was the main power in Yucatán until 1441 when a civil war broke out between the Tutul-Xiu and the Cocom. The war led to the destruction of the League in 1461. Although it destroyed the country, the Tutul-Xiues were victorious in killing all the members of the Cocom family except for one who was traveling in Honduras when the war broke out.

=== Post Independence ===
Like most of the Kuchkabalob of Yucatán, Hocabá-Homún was a province of the League of Mayapan before 1441. After the League was destroyed its former territory was separated into seventeen polities. These Kuchkabalob (plural of Kuchkabal the form of government used by the polities) were mostly monarchies although some were oligarchies. Hocabá-Homún was constantly at war with the surrounding Kuchkabalob, Sotuta, Tutul-Xiu (who conquered the Kuchkabal Calotmul), Ah Kin Chel, Ceh Pech, and Chakan. Hocabá-Homún was a monarchy run by a Halach Uinik, the royal family in Hocabá-Homún was the Luit family.

=== Conquest ===
The Spaniards attempted to conquer Yucatán three times, only succeeding on the final attempt in 1547. The last Halach Uinik (ruler) of Hocabá-Homún was Nadzal Luit. In 1549 Hocabá-Homún was one of the countries in north east Yucatán to join a rebellion against Spain. The confederation that was formed after the war lasted only one year, its capital was Zací, a city now named Valladolid.

== Government ==
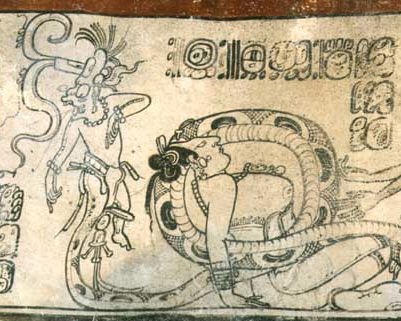
K'awiil was depicted on Manikin scepters, a royal object carried by Halach Uiniks

The Kuchkabalob were divided into municipalities called batalib (plural batalibob) each Batalib was ruled by a batab (batabob plural). The ruler of a Kuchkabal was called a Halach Uinik which means "person of fact, person of command". A Halach Uinik was a monarch, but some kuchkabalob were oligarchies, with batabil having a seat on a senate. As in the case of Ekab one batalib usually had more powerful batabob. The batabob were normally related to the Halach Uinik.

The batalib of Hocabá-Homún were Seyé, Tahmek, Hoctún, Xocchel, Huhí, Homún, Cuzamá and Hocabá. The halach uinik of Hocaba came from a lineage known as Iuit (Nahuatl for "feather"), which was rare elsewhere in the Yucatan peninsula but also found in Acalan. However, other families were more numerous, namely the Chan, Pech, May, Chim and Cocom.
