= Ah Canul =

Mayan polity

Kuchkabal Ah Canul
- 1443–1541
- Kuchkabals of Yucatan after 1461.
- Capital: Calkini
- Common languages: Official language: Yucatec
- Religion: Maya religion
- Government: Oligarchy
- Halach Uinik
- Historical era: Post Classic Period / Early Modern
  - Established: 1443
  - Disestablished: 1541
| Preceded by | Succeeded by |
| League of Mayapan | New Spain |

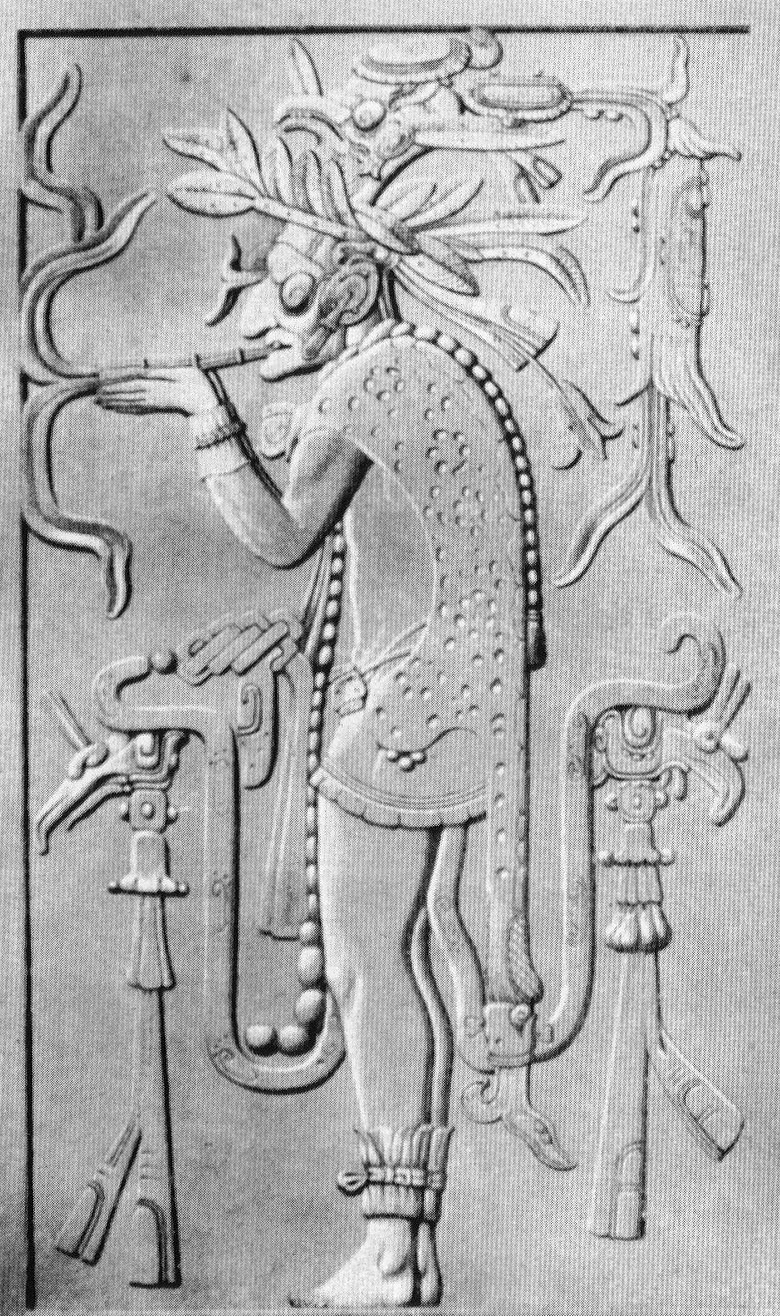
Mayan priest smoking

Ah Canul was the name of a Maya Kuchkabal of the northwest Yucatán Peninsula, before the arrival of the Spanish conquistadors in the 16th century.

== Origin of name ==
Ah Canul literally means "protector", derived from the verb canan which means to guard or protect.

== Organization ==
After the destruction of Mayapan (1441 – 1461), in the peninsula of Yucatán, the Maya great rivalries were created, and 16 or 17 were formed jurisdictions Kuchkabal separate calls. In each there was a Kuchkabal Halach Uinik (man made, man command), which had the highest military, judicial, and political authority, who lived in a major city considered the capital of the Kuchkabal.

Each kuchkabal was divided into several municipalities or batabilob (plural of batalib) which were governed by a batab. The batabob (plural of batab) obeyed the Halach Uinik and were often in their families. Each batabil was divided into several kuchkteel or residential units. This kind of small council resided in a village and was divided into extended families. Their representatives met to resolve important issues and the batab also part in these meetings, each batabil councils was composed of representatives of families or lineages called ah k'ul (delegate) and representatives appointed by the batab ah kuch called kob.

The halach uinik was the high priest of each kuchkabal. Next in the religious command Ah K'in May, after the regular priests k'in ah, ah nakom sacrificers, the chilam prophets and priests of lower rank: chako'ob.

The halach uinik was the highest military authority and appointed a captain named nacom, who coordinated the batabob also had a high military rank.

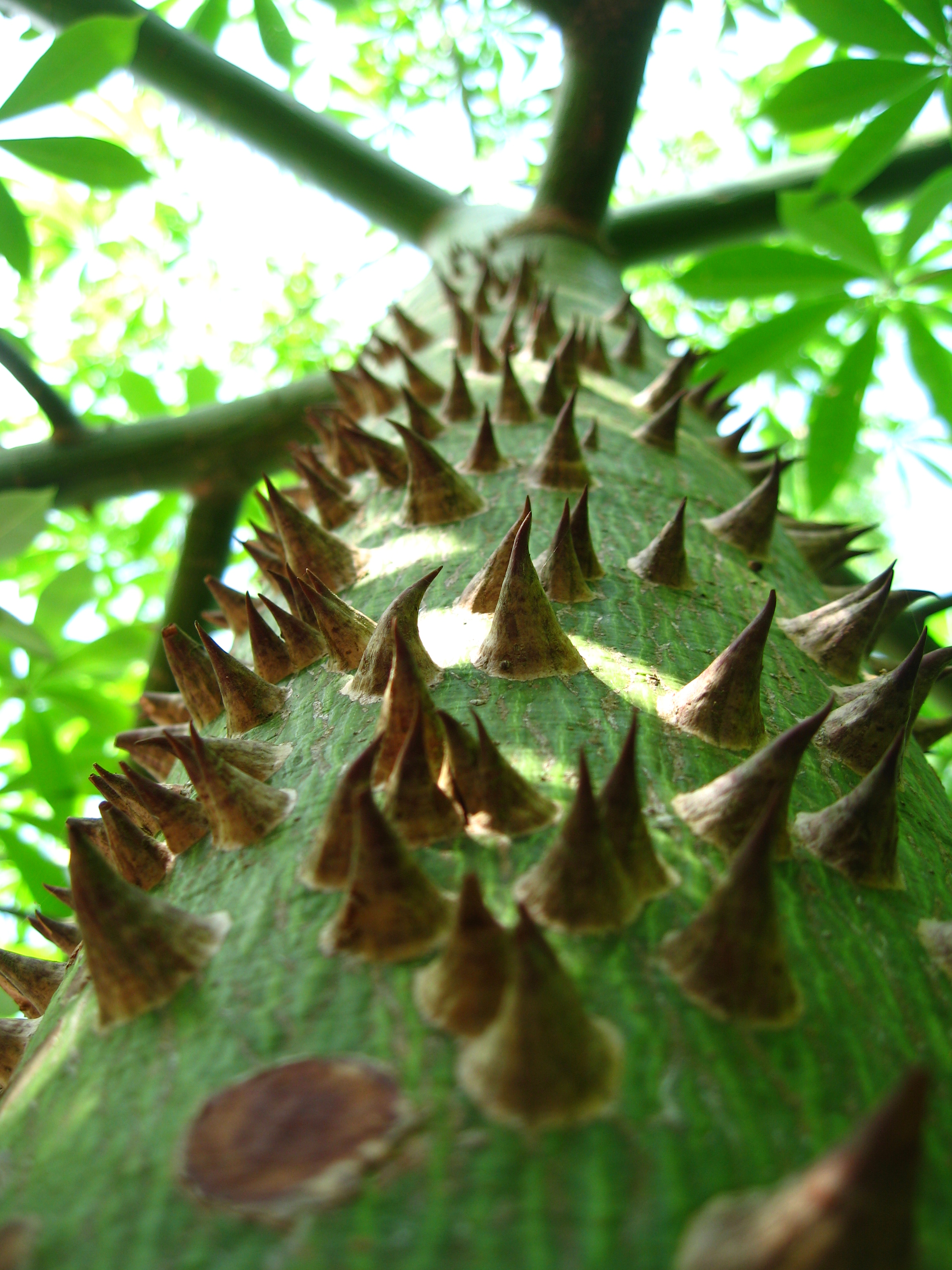
A Sacred Maya Ceiba Tree

For Ah Canul, the capital is Calkiní, but there was no halach uinik, the Kuchkabal of Ah Canul instead the Batabob had a senate. This senate was held under a Ceiba tree considered sacred, and is thus reached a consensus on the future of their communities.

== History ==
=== The end of The League ===
Shortly after the arrival of the Ah Canul, there was a civil war between Cocomes and Tutul-Xiu, two rival families in the League of Mayapan. The writings of Diego de Landa imply that the Cocom brought the Canul lineage (who were originally from the region of Tabasco) to the Yucatan to aid them against the Xiu, though the historicity of this account is disputed. Even with the Cocom enlisting the help of the Canul family, the country was destroyed by the armies of Ah Xiu Xupan, great lord of Uxmal, who was given the task of assassinating the royal family of the Cocom. Only one of the Cocom who was in Honduras survived and founded Tibolón in Sotuta.

"Who among the successors of the house of Cocom was a very proud and imitator of Cocom, and he made another league with Tabasco and put more Mexicans in the city and began bullying small people and making tham slaves. So the gentlemen gathered at the side of Tutu Xiu, who was their last great Republican, and determined to kill Cocom, which they did, also killing all his children while only one was absent, and he ransacked the house and took their property in cacao and other fruits, saying that they were paid what he had stolen. So a lasting fight started between both sides Cocomes and Xiues, ending the over 500 years prosperity of that city, leaving it deserted and depopulated, and each man to his land..." – An Account of the Things of Yucatan, Diego de Landa

Large cities were abandoned and the provinces in the league became independent Kuchkabals.

After the debacle of Mayapan, the Canul guards began to move westwards, specifically Region Camino Real, apparently the lineage Canche accompanied the Canul.

=== Founding of Ah Canul ===
The League of Mayapan was destroyed between 1441 and 1461. Ah Canul was divided into eight batabilob. The Batabob ruling them were

- Ah Tzab Canul
- Ah Dzun Canul
- Ah Kin Canul
- Ah Paal Canul ó Ah Pa Canul
- Ah Sulim Canul
- Ah Chacah Canul
- Ix Pacab Canul ó Ix Copacab Canul
- Nah Bich Canul

In 1443 they gathered under a Ceiba tree in Calkini were they agreed to form a Kuchkabal. They made Ah Tzab Canul the oldest of them their Halach Uinik (Ruler), but after he died the Batabob formed a senate instead of electing a new Halach Uinik.

=== Conquest ===
The Coat of Arms of Tenabo is an adaptation of the original symbol for the town.

The Spaniards believed that Ah Canul would ally with them in their third attempt at conquering the Maya Kuchkabals in Yucatán. But most of the Ah Canul batabob refused, especially the batab of Calkiní.

Francisco de Montejo's nephew, joined with native provinces and allied with a company of 40 men, forced the submission of the Ah Canul who tried desperately to stop the advance of the Spaniards.

After the confrontation, the Spaniards advanced through Tenabo, Hecelchakán, Calkiní, Tuchicán, and Maxcanú.

The Spaniards stopped at Tenabo and Calkiní to reorganize and supply its military forces, as in Pocboc the Palm Sunday of 1541 had a major problem, his camp was burned and lost their supplies, clothing and ammunition.

== Economy ==
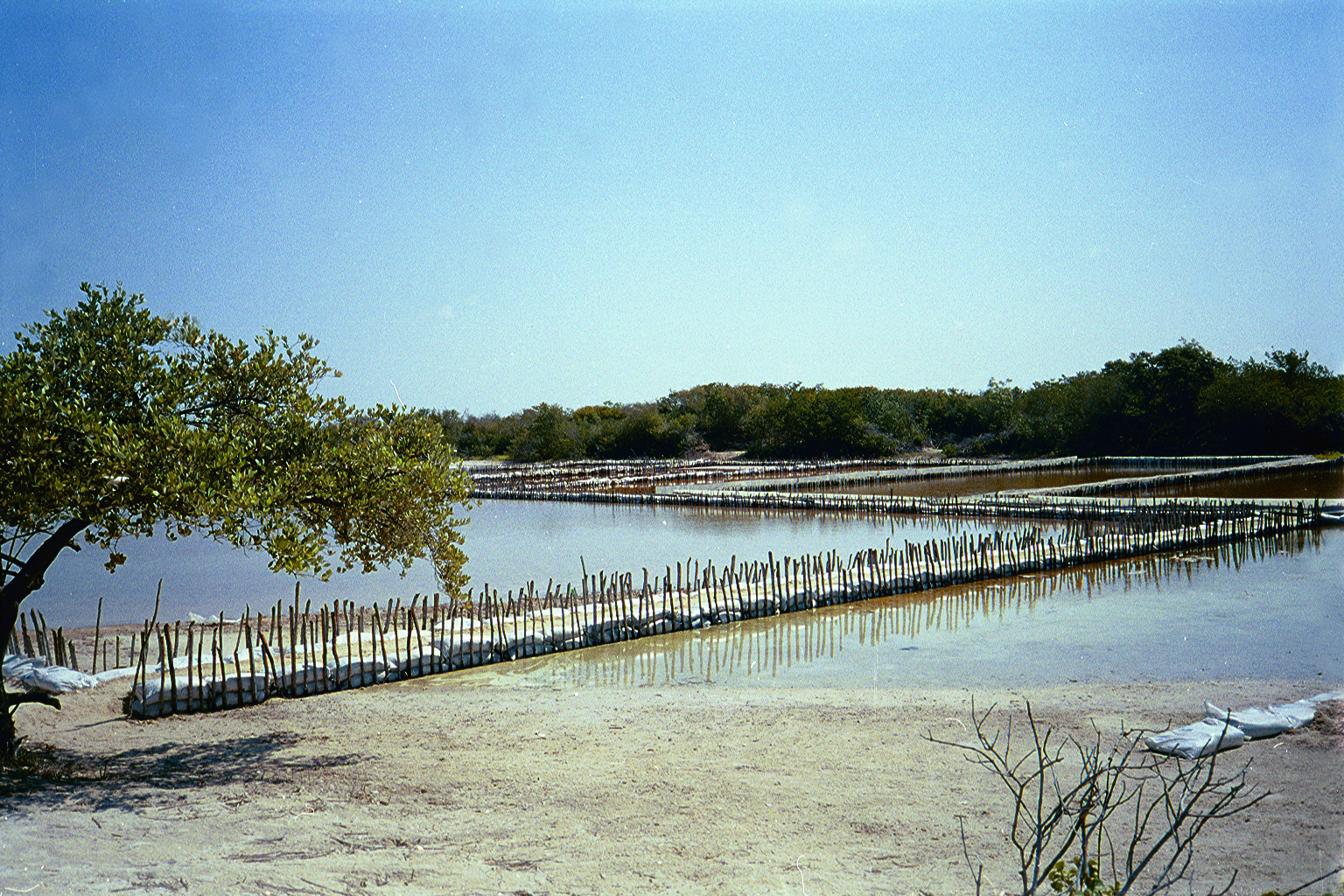
Salt production in Yucatán

Before the arrival of the Spanish conquistadors, the Maya civilization had a strong commercial and maritime activity. Whereas some Kuchkabals produced cocoa, others produced salt, in the case of Ah Canul, the product which was produced was cotton.

After conquering the entire northern and southern coast Ah Canul was a major producing region of salt, which paid tribute under the regime of the parcels.
