= League of Mayapan =

Post-classic confederation of Mayan states

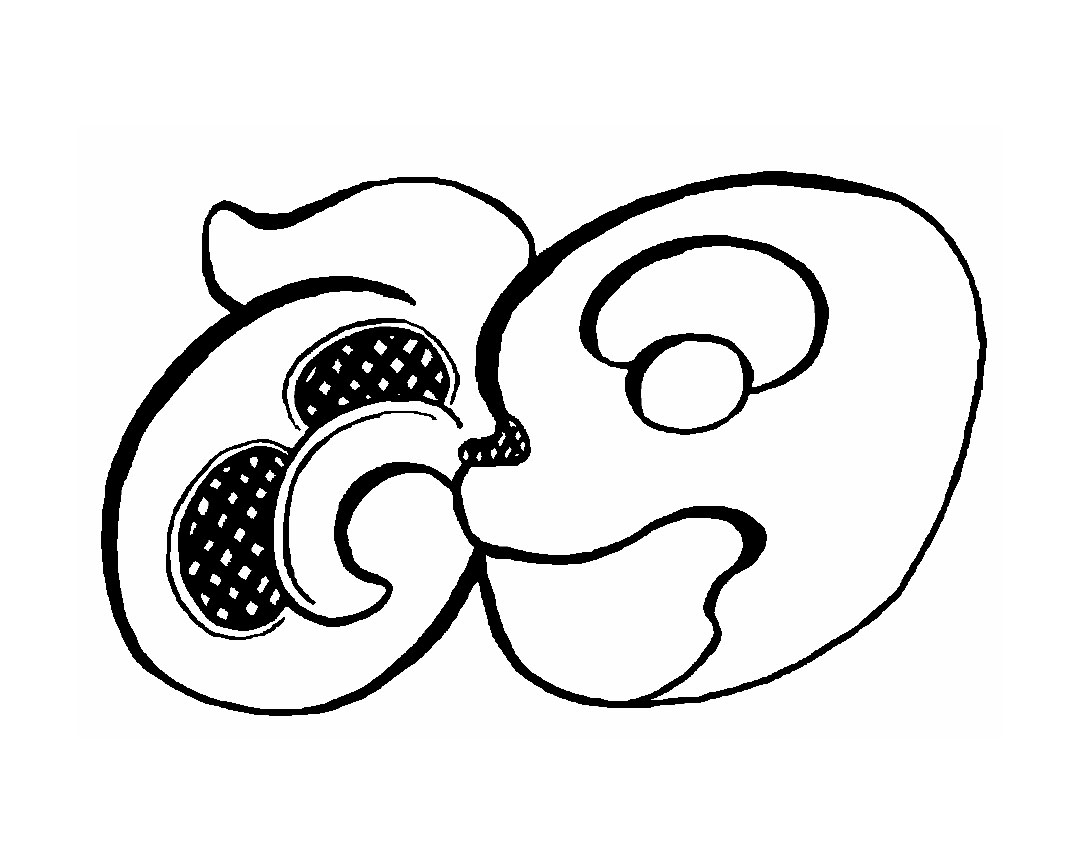
League of Mayapan Luub Mayapan
- 1007–1441
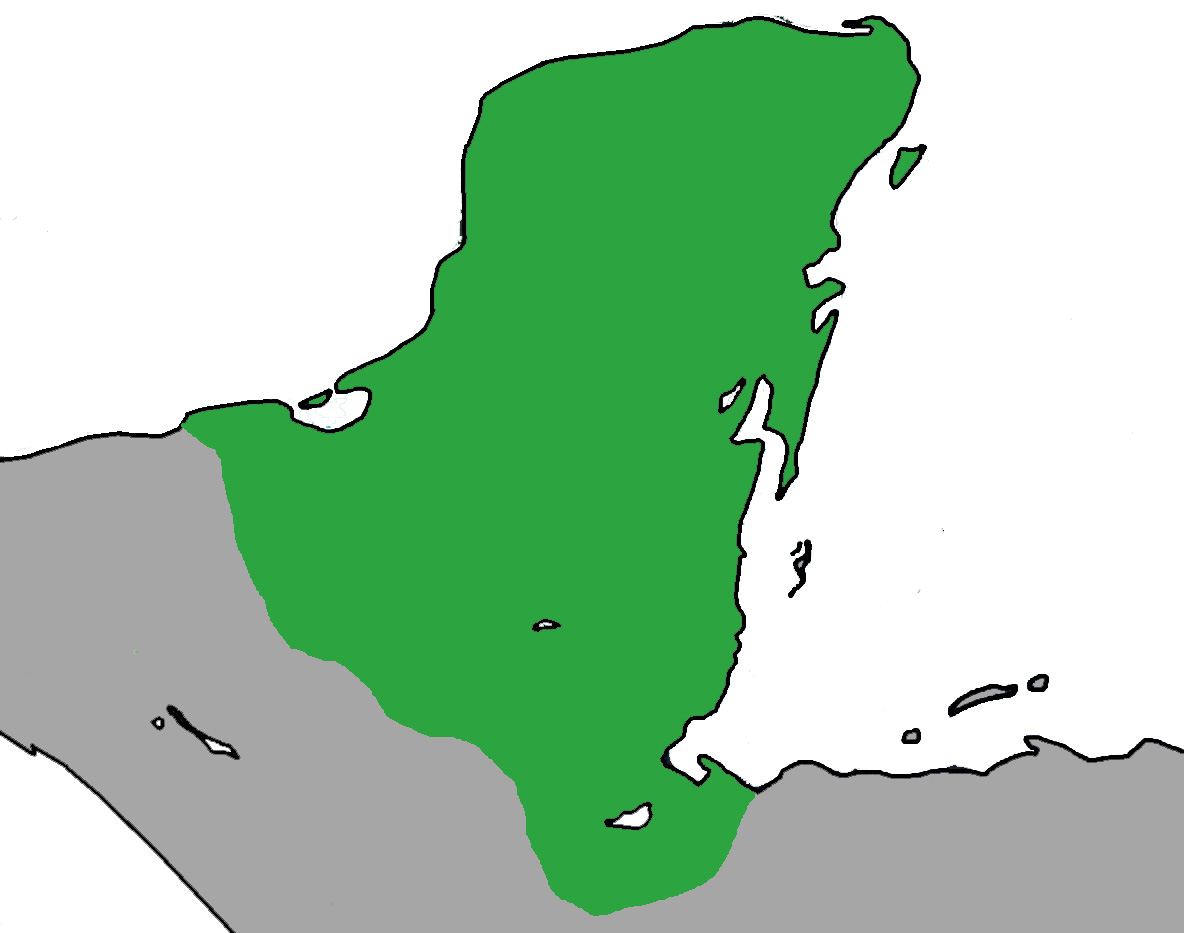
- The League of Mayapan at its greatest extent, circa 1200
- Capital: Mayapan, Uxmal, Chichen Itza
- Common languages: Yucatec Maya, likely Nahuatl and possibly Chontal for a short time among some lineages
- Religion: Maya religion
  - 987–1007: Ah Mekat Tutul Xiu (first)
  - 1441–1461: Ah Xiu Xupan (last)
- Historical era: Postclassic period
  - Ah Mekat Tutul Xiu unites Chichen Itza, Mayapan, and Uxmal: 1007
  - Hunac Ceel Cauich claims divine power and attempts to reform the government: 1194
  - Rebellions by the Tutul Xiu and their allies disintegrate the government: 1441
Preceded by
Toltec Empire
Maya collapse
Itzá Kingdom (970–987)
Ek' Balam
Succeeded by
Kuchkabal
Tabasco (former state)
Acalan
Itzá Kingdom (1194–1697)
Kowoj
Yalain
Kejache
Mopan
- Today part of: Mexico; Guatemala; Belize; Honduras

The League of Mayapan (Yucatec: Luub Mayapan Maya glyphs:) is a now outdated scientific theory about a confederation of three Maya states in the Postclassic period of Mesoamerica on the Yucatan Peninsula. According to it, the members of the league were Chichén Itzá, Uxmal und Mayapán.

The theory dates back to Sylvanus Morley in 1911, who based it on writings from colonial times. Since the 1950s it has met with growing skepticism, as it contradicts archaeological evidence. In particular, the fact that the three cities were not contemporaneous with one another in their respective heydays, and the recognition that the Chilam Balam, Morley’s main source, is not fully reliable, have led to the idea of a tripartite confederacy no longer receiving consideration; it is now mostly seen as outdated.

== Before the League ==
=== The Itza ===
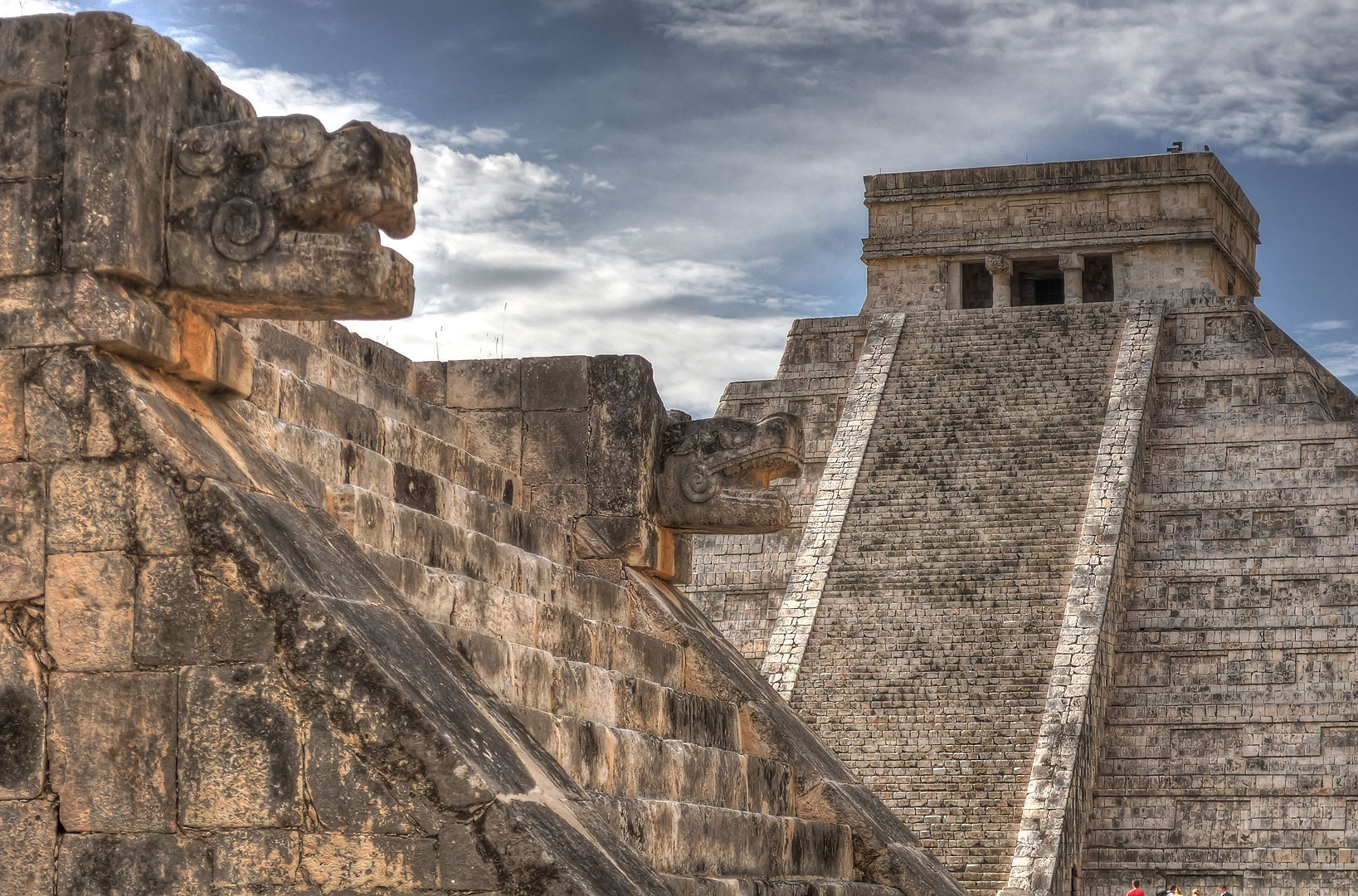
Chichen Itza

The Itza were known as water witches. According to the Chilam Balam of Chumayel, in 325, they started immigrating to Bacalar from Peten. From there many of them continued northwest, where they conquered the classical Maya city of Uuc Yabnal and renamed it as Chichen Itza. They lived there from 550 to 692. After that, for economic and political reasons, the Itza moved to Chakan Putum, where they lived until 928, when they returned to Chichen Itza.

=== The Tutul-Xiu ===
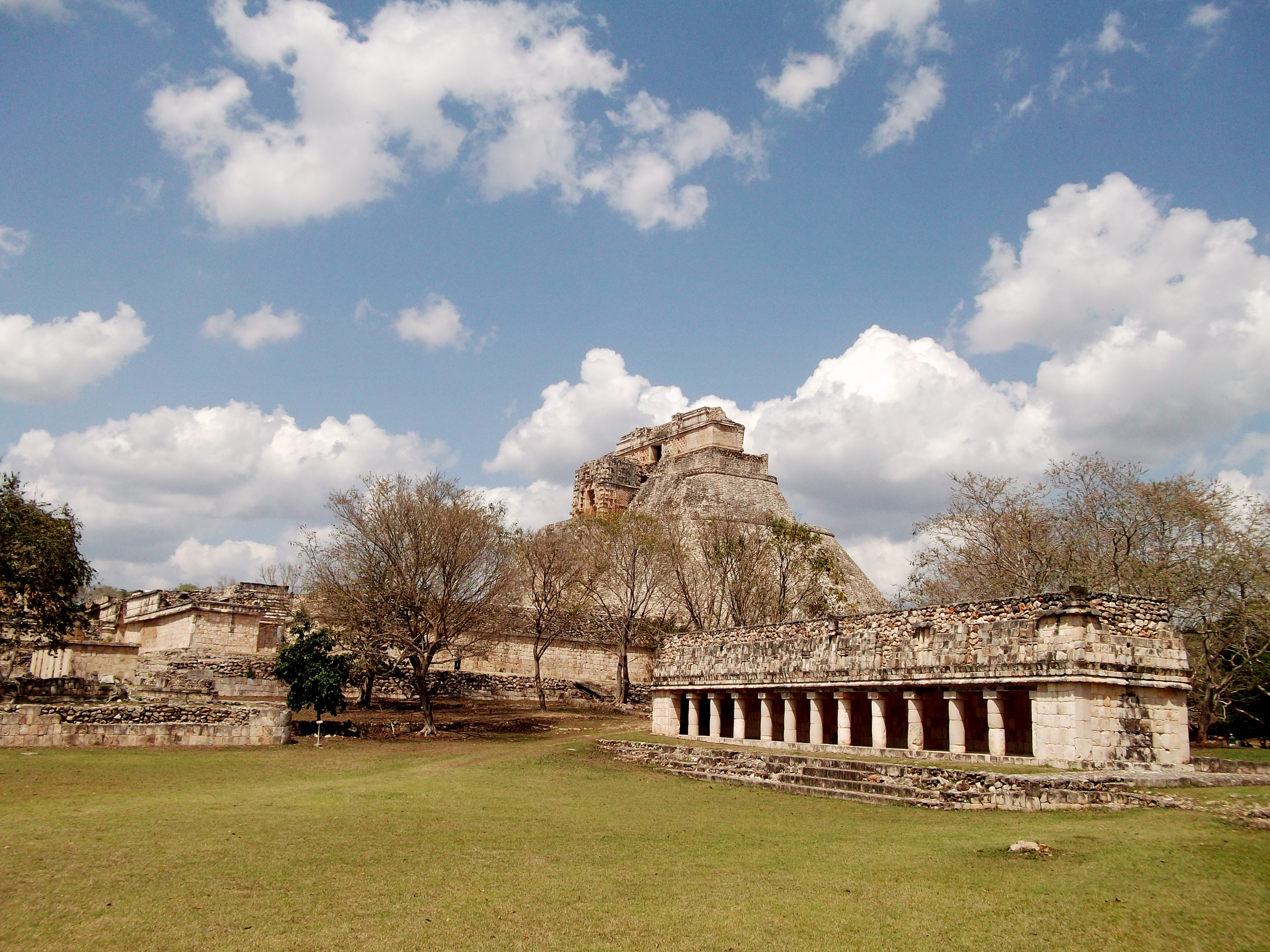
Uxmal

The Tutul-Xiu were known as overflowing virtue. In the 7th century, they migrated to Yucatan. There their leader Ah Suytok Tutul Xiu, nicknamed Chac Uitzil Hun, founded Uxmal. The date that this happened is disputed by a codex from Tizimin, and another from Mani. In 869, Ah Mekat Tutul Xiu ruler of the Tutul-Xiu moved to Uxmal from Nonohual. Nonohual's location is unknown, but was probably in Peten, it also might have been another name for Potonchán in Tabasco or Tula. The Tutul-Xiu were the main group of people forcing the Itza out of Chichen Itza.

=== Cocom ===
The Cocom were known as the lineage of the wood pigeon. They lived farther to the west and forced the Itza out of Chakan Putum. The Itza spent forty years living in the rainforest. They called it Xulucmul (living under the trees in ash and poverty).

== Foundation ==
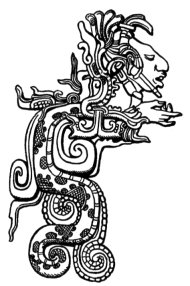
Kukulkan

Before the foundation of the league, the Toltecs invaded Yucatan. Their leader was the semi-mythical king Kukulcan. Whether Kukulkan was real or not, the Toltecs had influence over the Maya there.

"The Indians who inhabited Chichen Itza, ruled by a great lord called Kukulcan, and showing this be true named the main building Kukulcan, and say they came from the west and differing in whether entered before or after the Yzaes or with them, and said they were well prepared and had no wife or children, and say that after his return he was taken into Mexico by one of their gods and called Cezalcuati, [Quetzalcoatl]." List of things Yucatan, Diego de Landa.

Ah Mekat Tutul Xiu, is considered the ruler who founded the League of Mayapan in 987. He unified Chichen Itza, Mayapan, and Uxmal. Chichen Itza being the main city, with a population of approximately 50,000 people. He continued to incorporate other areas, Zama (Tulum), Ichpatun, Itzamal, and the Cocom region.

== Hunac Ceel Cauich ==
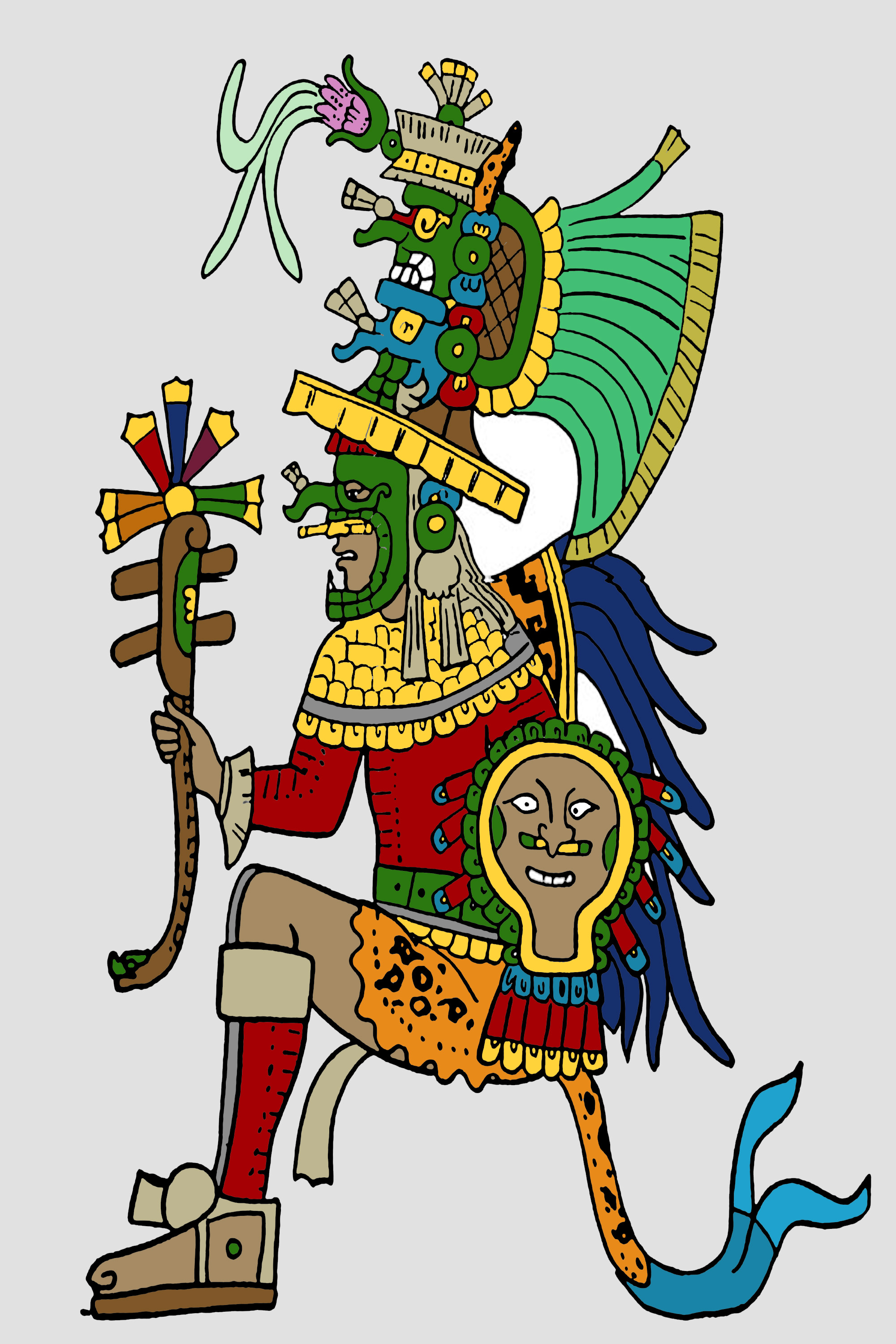
Chac Xib Chac

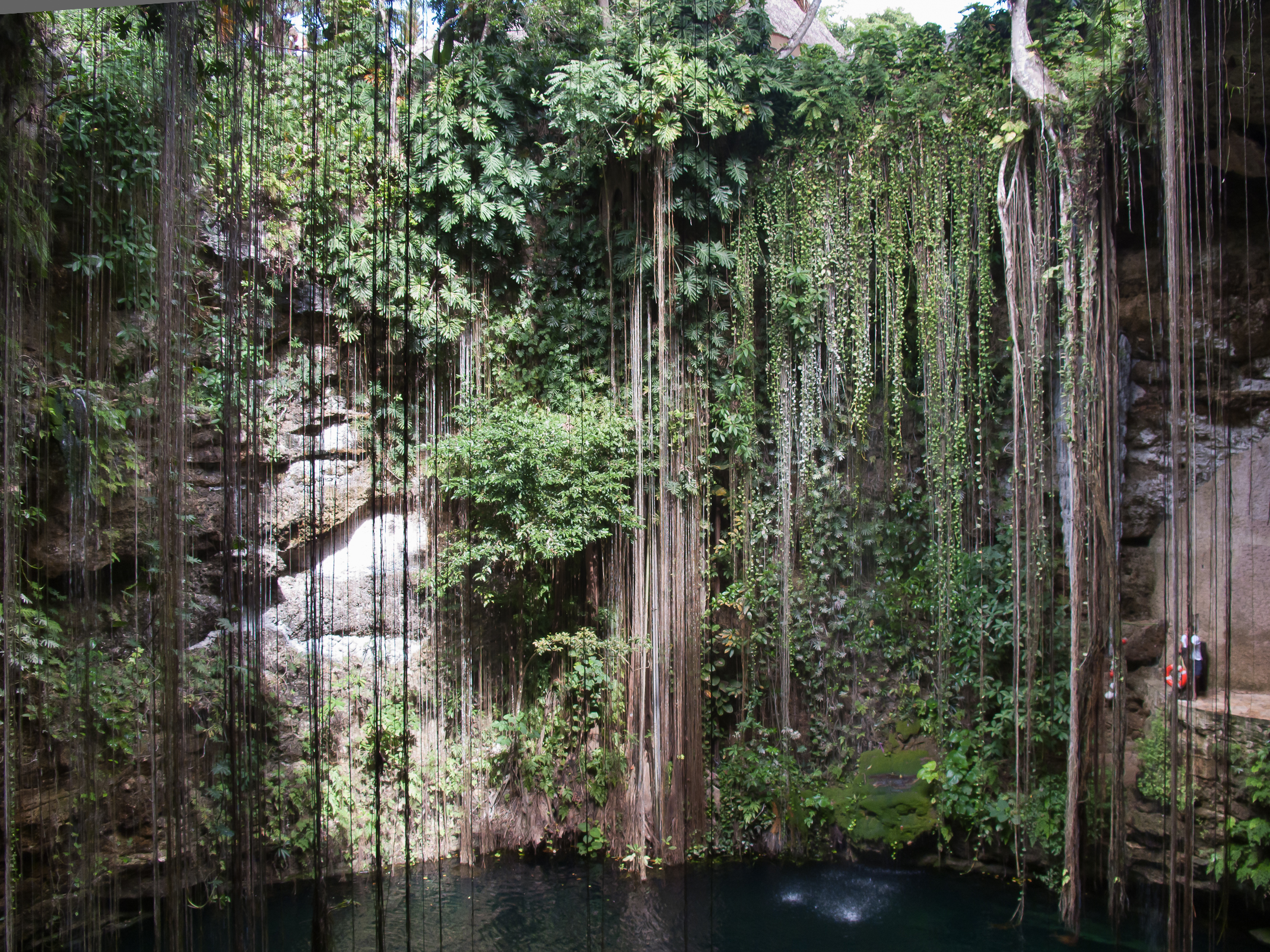
A Karstik doline known as cenote

In 1175, the league began to disintegrate. A Cocom man named Ceel Cauich Ah was ritually thrown into the cenote of Chichen Itza (cenote being the a Spanish term for the Mayan word dzonot, which is a deep, karstik sinkhole filled with water). The Sacred Cenote of Chichen Itza was specially considered an entrance to the afterlife and thus a site of pilgrimage. It is 15 meters deep from the ground to the water surface and its very steep walls made almost impossible to climb out if thrown into. However, Ceel managed to survive and climbed out, which he used as a sign of his divine right to rule and proclaimed himself Ajaw, a spiritual and political leader. He also renamed himself Hunac Ceel Cauich. The Itza did not fall for this ruse and refused to recognize his authority. Ceel gathered many followers from Mayapan and The Cocom region. In 1194, Hunac Ceel Cauich declared war on Chac-Xib-Chac one of the K'ul Kokom, the four rulers of Chichen Itza. The other three K'ul Kokom, and his brothers were Sac Xib Chac, Chac Ek Yuuan, and Hun Yuuan Chac (also called uooh Puc). Ah Itzimthul Chac was also one of the Chac brothers, he ruled Ichcanzihoo also known as T'ho in present-day Mérida.

=== Legend of the depopulation of Chichen Itza ===
Scientific data points to the fact that Chichen Itza declined before the rise of Mayapan as a regional power, but ongoing research is currently being done in several Maya sites, so there is not any chronological certainty yet.

However, traditional sources (which are often mixed with fantasy and legend) say that Hunac Ceel Cauich had a daughter named Sac Nicté (in Yucatec Maya Sac Nikté' meaning white flower). Sac Nicté fell in love with a member of the royalty of Chichen Itza named Canek (Kaan Ek in Yucatec, meaning black snake). When they met, Sac Nicté was 15 and Canek was 21. This was the same day Canek was crowned ruler of the Itza. The Itza chose new ruler every Katún Ahau (period of almost 20 years). Based on this Canek became ruler of the Itzá on 22 November 1194. Sac Nicté and Canek instantly fell in love. Sac Nicté was destined, by prearranged marriage, to marry Ah Ulil, Batab of Izamal. Canek and Sac Nicté slept together, later Canek stayed awake all night crying because he knew he could not marry Sac Nicté. Ah Ulil and Sac Nicté's wedding was to take place 37 days after Canek's coronation (29 December 1194). Three days before, the wedding fiancés arrived in Uxmal. Gifts from all over Mayeb arrived, Gold, animal tusks, perfume, emeralds, and turtle shells filled with quetzal feather. These gifts came from distant and near cities - except nothing arrived from Chichen Itza. On the day of the wedding, Uxmal was decorated with ribbons, feather, plants, and brightly painted bows, the people of the city were dancing and having parties in the street. Ajaws, Batabs, Halch Uiniks, Nobles, and other elites arrived with minstrels. Canek had been invited and he arrived, with him he brought the Itza sixty best soldiers. Canek and his warriors ran to the altar where Sac Nicté was being married. Incense was burning and a priest was chanting. Sac Nicté, Canek, and the sixty warriors fled Uxmal, everything had happened so fast that nobody was able to try and stop them. Hunac Ceel, Ah Ulil, and other leaders traveled with a large army to Chichen Itza only to find the city completely abandoned. Sac Nicté led the Itzá to Nojpetén where they established a new Itza Kingdom.

== Important people ==
- Ah Ulil
- Ah Itzimthul Chac, a Batab
- Chac-Xib-Chac, a ruler of Chichen Itza
- Hapay Can, was probably a ruler of Chichen Itza
- Sac Xib Chac, a ruler of Chichen Itza
- Chac Ek Yuuan, a ruler of Chichen Itza
- Hun Yuuan Chac (also called uooh Puc), a ruler of Chichen Itza
- Ix Zacbeliz, a queen of Chichen Itza
- Zac Xib Chac, Chac-Xib-Chacs brother
- Uayom-chich, a priest
- Uxmal Chac, a Batab and a priest
- Cabal Xiu, a priest
- Hunac Ceel
- Ah Mekat Tutul Xiu, founded the league
- Ah Xiu Xupan, started the war that ended the league
- Mo-Chel, a nobleman from Mayapan
- Ah Yamazi, Batab of Yobain
- Xkil Itzam Pech, Batab of Kini
- The Pech family
- The Cupul family
- The Cochuah family
- The Cocom family
- The Xiu family
- The Chel family, descendants of Mo-Chel
- The Canul family
- The Cauich family

== End of the League ==
The Kuchkabals of Yucatan after the league. The borders closely resemble those of the provinces that were there before. Calotmul was controlled by Tutul Xiu.

In 1441, Ah Xiu Xupan, the great ruler of Uxmal, was given the task of making war on the royal family of the Cocom, whom he managed to kill. Only one of the Cocom, who was in Honduras at the time, survived and later founded Tibolón. The war between Uxmal and Cocom plunged the league into chaos. There was segregation in the provinces and several uprisings broke out. By 1461, the league was completely disintegrated.

After the war, Yucatan broke up into seventeen Kuchkabals.
