= Sotuta =

Town in Yucatán, Mexico

Coordinates: 20.5968°N 89.0082°W

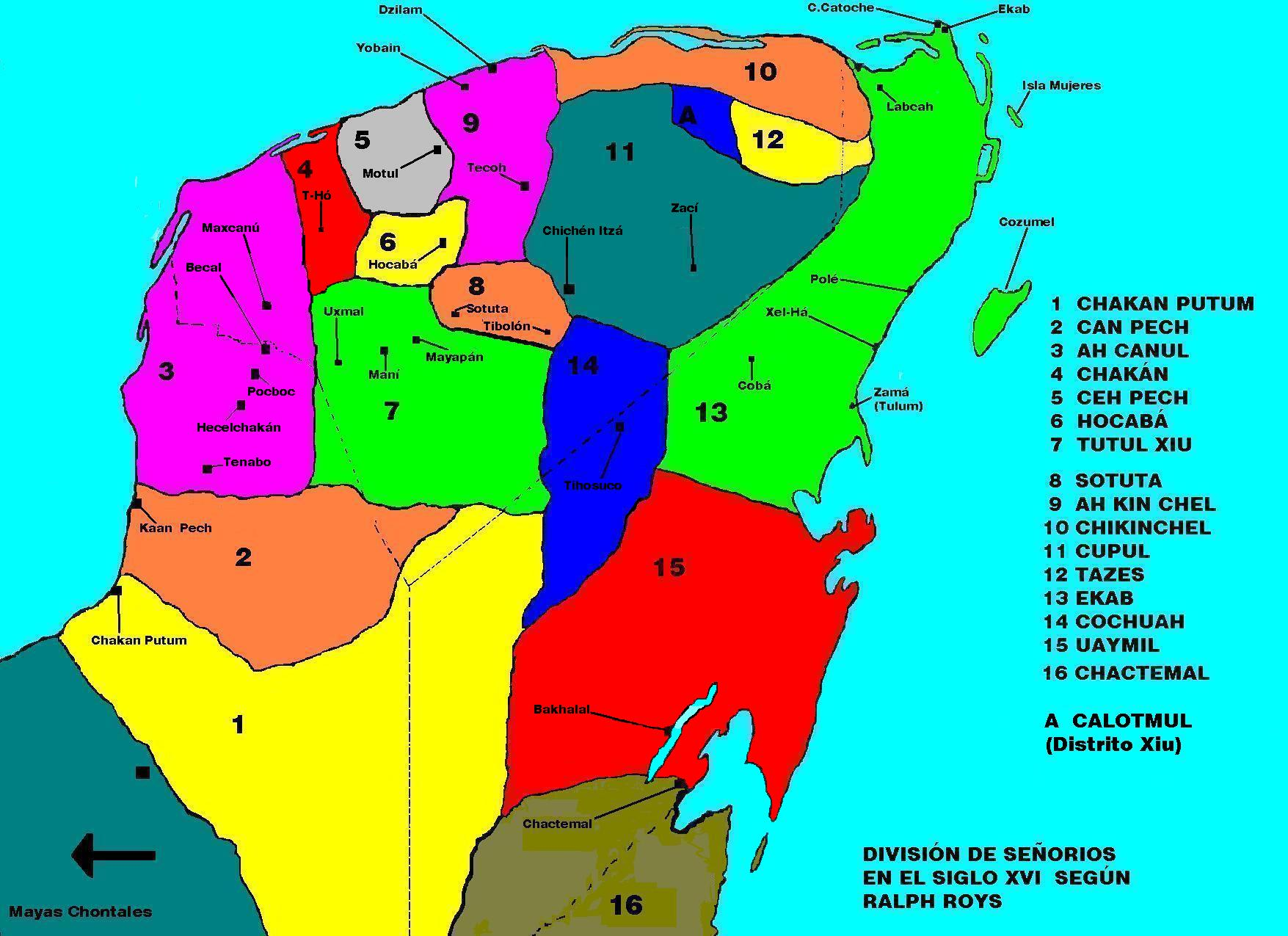
Chiefdoms of Yucatán: marked 8

Sotuta is a small town and municipality of the Mexican state of Yucatán.

It also was the name of a Maya kuchkabal (polity) of the northern central Yucatán Peninsula, before the arrival of the Spanish conquistadors in the sixteenth century. It was founded by remnants of the Cocom family who survived the 1441 massacre of Ah Xiu Xupan and the collapse of Mayapan, and the head of the Cocom family was the halach uinik of the province. Sotuta engaged in warfare with its neighbors of Ah Kin Chel, Tutul-Xiu and Hocaba. Besides the Cocom, other prominent families included the Chi, Euan, Chan and May. At the time of the conquest, the reigning halach uinik was Nachi Cocom. Pech accounts describe Sotuta as within the kuchkabal of Chichen Itza, which may refer to the pre-1441 political geography. The halach uiniks of Sotuta claimed descent from Kukulkan.

== See also ==
- Ah Kin Chel
- Ah Canul
- Ceh Pech
- Chakan
- Chetumal
