= Canek (disambiguation) =

Canek may refer to:

- Canek, Itza Mayan rulers
- Canek (chiefdom), a chiefdom of Yucatán
- El Canek, a Mexican masked lucha libre wrestler
- Jacinto Canek, Mayan revolutionary
