= Ah Mekat Tutul Xiu =

Founder of the League of Mayapan

Ah Mekat Tutul Xiu established an alliance between Uxmal, Chichen Itza and Mayapan in the span of thirteen years (987–1007 AD). He founded the League of Mayapan; a confederation between the Maya in Yucatán. Other than the three capitals, it included the manors of Izamal, Tulum, Ichpatún, the Cocom and others. This alliance existed from 987 to 1461. In 1194, the Itza for the second time abandoned Chichén Itzá to settle in the Petén. Later, Hunac Ceel would separate the Itza from the rest of the League.
