= Ah Suytok Tutul Xiu =

Spiritual leader of the Maya Tutul Xiu people

- Ruler of Tutul Xiu
- Reign: 6th–7th century
- Predecessor: ?
- Successor: ?
- Born: 6th century Tula, Potonchán, or Peten
- Died: 7th century Uxmal
- Issue: founded Uxmal

Ah Suytok Tutul Xiu or Ah Zuytok Tutul Xiu was the spiritual leader of the Maya Tutul Xiu people. Founder of the city of Uxmal in the 7th century, he was from the Nonohual. Nonohual's location is unknown, but was probably in Peten, it also might have been another name for Potonchán in Tabasco or Tula. He was also known by his nickname coconut kaba or "Hun Uitzil Chac" ("the only mountain of Chaac").

The Chilam Balam of Tizimín, describes Zuytok Ah Tutul Xiu as the founder of the city of Uxmal in the Katun 10 Ahau (669). However, the Chilam Balam of Mani describes the same fact in the Katun 2 Ahau (620).

Three centuries later the priestly house of Tutul-Xiu of Uxmal was part of the League of Mayapan. This dynastic line of succession is believed to have begun around 435 AD. The eruption of a volcano in 430 AD may have disrupted the line of succession.
