= Peten Itza kingdom =

Postclassic Maya state

Peten Itza Kingdom
- 1194–1697
- The Itza kingdom
- Status: Kingdom
- Capital: Nojpetén
- Common languages: Itza’
- Religion: Maya religion
- Government: Monarchy
- Historical era: post classic period
  - Hunac Ceel forces the Itza people out of Chichen Itza: 1194
  - Fall of Nojpetén: 1697
Preceded by	Succeeded by
League of Mayapan	New Spain
- Today part of: Mexico; Guatemala; Belize

The Peten Itza kingdom was a kingdom centered on the island-city of Nojpetén on Lake Peten Itza.

== Nojpetén ==
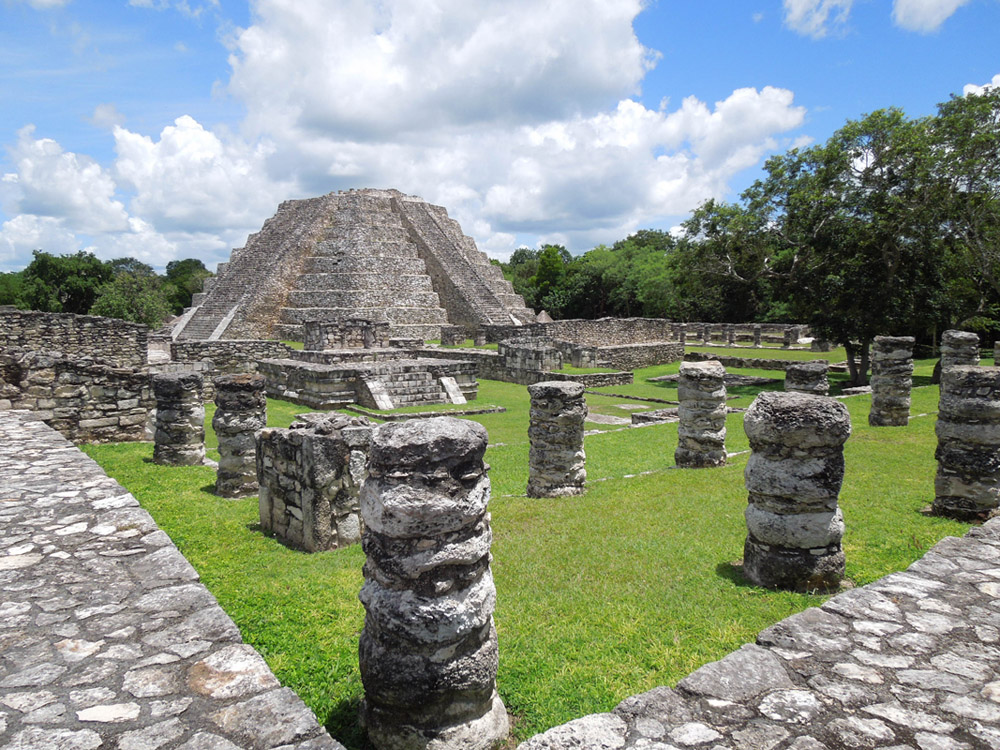
The main Temple in Mayapan would have looked similar to the one in Nojpetén

Tayasal is on a small island surrounded by water, and unless the natives go by canoe, they cannot enter by land; and they whitewash the houses and temples so they may be seen from more than two leagues distant

— Bernal Díaz del Castillo, Historia verdadera de la conquista de la Nueva España - Chapter CLXXVIII

Nojpetén was closely packed with buildings that included temples, palaces and thatched houses.

In 1698 Spanish accounts describe the city as having had 21 temples, the largest of these (which the Spanish called a castillo (castle or palace) had a square base measuring 16.5 metres (54 ft) on each side. It had 9 stepped levels and faced northward; it appeared very similar in design to the principal pyramids at Chichen Itza and Mayapan in Yucatán. This was about half the size of the Mayapan castillo; its 9 levels may each have been less than 1 metre (3.3 ft) high; the pyramid would still have been imposing. It possibly had only one access stairway rather than the four radial stairways found in the examples in Yucatán. The pyramid was topped by a flat-roofed summit shrine that contained idols representing Itza gods. The dismantling of this pyramid would have required considerable effort but no mention of this is found in Spanish records.

When Spanish missionary Andrés de Avendaño y Loyola visited the city in early 1696, nine of the temples had recently been burnt during a Kowoj Maya attack and subsequently rebuilt; during the attack many houses had also been destroyed. Ritual ceramics, identified by the Spanish as idols, were arranged in pairs upon small benches throughout the city. The Spanish set about destroying the pagan idols after conquering the city.

== History ==
=== Separation ===
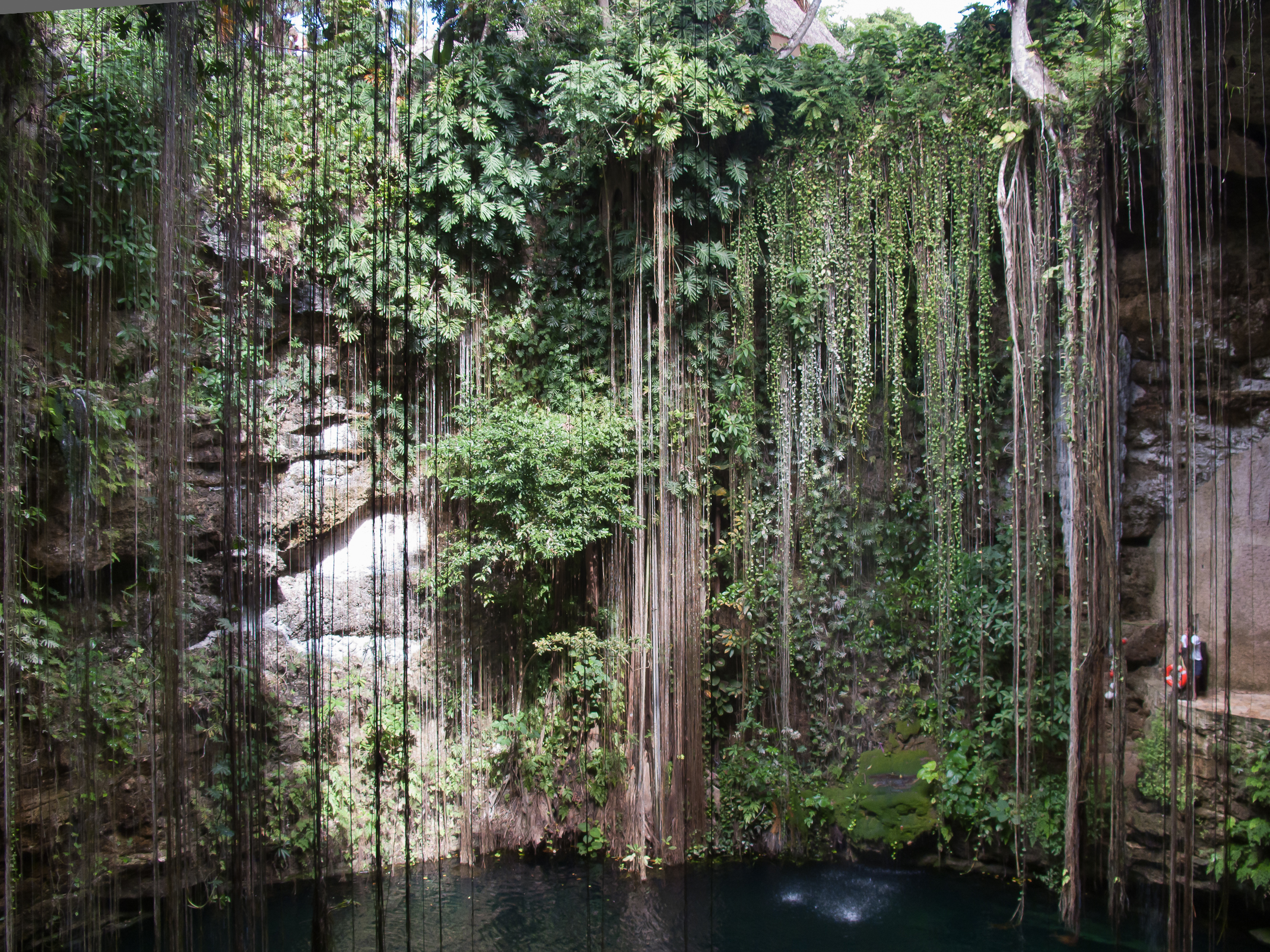
The Sacred Cenote in Chichen Itza

In 1175, the league began to disintegrate. A Cocom man named Ceel Cauich Ah was thrown into the cenote of Chichen Itza. The cenote is a deep hole filled with water. It is 15 meters from the ground to the water, and the walls are very steep. It is considered an entrance to the afterlife, and it is almost impossible to climb out. But Ceel managed to climb out. He proclaimed himself Ajaw, a spiritual and political leader. He also renamed himself Hunac Ceel Cauich. The Itzas did not recognize his authority. Ceel gathered many followers from Mayapan and the Cocom region. In 1194 Hunac Ceel Cauich declared war on Chac Chac Xib, one of four rulers of Chichén Itzá. The other three brothers were Sac Xib Chac, Chac Ek Yuuan and Hun Yuuan Chac (also called uooh Puc). Itzáes finally migrated to Tayasal, an island on Lake Peten Itza, in 1194.

=== Early 16th century ===
In 1525, after the Spanish conquest of the Aztec Empire, Hernán Cortés led an expedition to Honduras over land, cutting across the Itza kingdom en route. His aim was to subdue the rebellious Cristóbal de Olid, whom he had sent to conquer Honduras, but Cristóbal de Olid had set himself up independently on his arrival in that territory. Cortés arrived at the north shore of Lake Petén Itzá on 13 March 1525; he was met there by the Aj Kan Ek'. The Roman Catholic priests accompanying the expedition celebrated mass in the presence of Kan Ek', who was said to be so impressed that he pledged to worship the Cross and to destroy his idols. Cortés accepted an invitation from the king to visit Nojpetén, and crossed to the Maya city with a small contingent of Spanish soldiers while the rest of his army continued around the lake to meet him on the south shore. Cortés left behind a lame horse that the Itza treated as a deity, attempting to feed it poultry, meat, and flowers, but the animal soon died.

=== Early 17th century ===
Following Cortés' visit, no Spanish attempted to visit the warlike Itza inhabitants of Nojpetén for almost a hundred years. In 1618 two Franciscan friars set out from Mérida in Yucatán on a mission to attempt the peaceful conversion of the still pagan Itza in central Petén. Bartolomé de Fuensalida and Juan de Orbita were accompanied by the alcalde of Bacalar (a Spanish colonial official) and some Christianised Maya. After an arduous six-month journey the travellers were well received by the current Kan Ek'. They stayed at Nojpetén for some days in an attempt to evangelise the Itza but the Aj Kan Ek' refused to renounce his Maya religion, although he showed interest in the masses held by the Catholic missionaries. Kan Ek' informed them that according to ancient Itza prophecy it was not yet time for them to convert to Christianity. In the time since Cortés had visited Nojpetén, the Itza had made a statue of the deified horse. Juan de Orbita was outraged when he saw the idol and he immediately smashed it into pieces. Fuensalida was able to save the lives of the visitors from the infuriated natives by means of a particularly eloquent sermon that resulted in them being forgiven. Attempts to convert the Itza failed and the friars left Nojpetén on friendly terms with Kan Ek'.

The friars returned in 1619, arriving in October and staying for eighteen days. Again Kan Ek' welcomed them in a friendly manner; however the Maya priesthood were hostile and jealous of the missionaries' influence upon the king. They persuaded Kan Ek's wife to convince him to expel the unwelcome visitors. The missionaries' lodgings were surrounded by armed warriors and the friars and their accompanying servants were escorted to a waiting canoe and instructed to leave and never come back. Juan de Orbita attempted to resist and was rendered unconscious by an Itza warrior. The missionaries were expelled without food or water but survived the journey back to Mérida.

=== Interlude ===
In 1622 Captain Francisco de Mirones set out from Yucatán to launch an assault upon the Itza. His army was later joined by Franciscan friar Diego Delgado. En route to Nojpetén, Delgado believed that the army's treatment of the Maya was excessively cruel and he left the army to make his own way to Nojpetén with eighty Christianised Maya from Tipu in Belize. When the party arrived at Nojpetén, they were all seized and sacrificed to the Maya gods. Soon afterwards, the Itza caught Mirones and his soldiers off guard and unarmed in the church at Sacalum; they were slaughtered to a man. These events ended all Spanish attempts to contact the Itza until 1695.

=== Late 17th century ===
Second War of Tayasal
- Part of Spanish conquest of Guatemala
Date	1685 – 13 March 1697
Location	Nojpetén
Result	Spanish victory

Belligerents
Spanish Empire	Petén Itzá kingdom Zacpeten

Commanders and leaders
Martín de Ursúa	Kan Ekʼ

Strength
60 soldiers	2,000 warriors

In 1695, the governor of Yucatán, Martín de Ursúa y Arizmendi, began to build a road from Campeche south towards Petén. Franciscan Andrés de Avendaño followed the new road as far as possible then continued towards Nojpetén with local Maya guides. They arrived at the western end of Lake Petén Itzá to an enthusiastic welcome by the local Itza. The following day, the current Aj Kan Ek' travelled across the lake with eighty canoes to greet the visitors. The Franciscans returned to Nojpetén with Kan Ek' and baptised over 300 Itza children over the following four days. Avendaño tried to convince Kan Ek' to convert to Christianity and surrender to the Spanish crown, without success. The king of the Itza, like his forebear, cited Itza prophecy and said the time was not yet right. He asked the Spanish to return in four months, at which time the Itza would convert and swear fealty to the King of Spain. Kan Ek' learnt of a plot by a rival Itza group to ambush and kill the Franciscans and the Itza king advised them to return to Mérida via Tipu. The Spanish friars became lost and suffered great hardships but eventually arrived back in Mérida after a month travelling.

Kan Ek' sent emissaries to Mérida in December 1695 to inform Martín de Ursúa that the Itza would peacefully submit to Spanish rule. A Spanish party led by Captain Pedro de Zubiaur arrived at Lake Petén Itza with 60 soldiers, friar San Buenaventura and allied Yucatec Maya warriors. Although they expected a peaceful welcome they were immediately attacked by approximately 2000 Maya warriors. San Buenaventura and one of his Franciscan companions, a Spanish soldier and a number of Yucatec Maya warriors were taken prisoner. Spanish reinforcements arrived the next day but were beaten back. This turn of events convinced Martín de Ursúa that Kan Ek' would not surrender peacefully and he began to organise an all-out assault on Nojpetén.

=== War with the Ko'woj ===
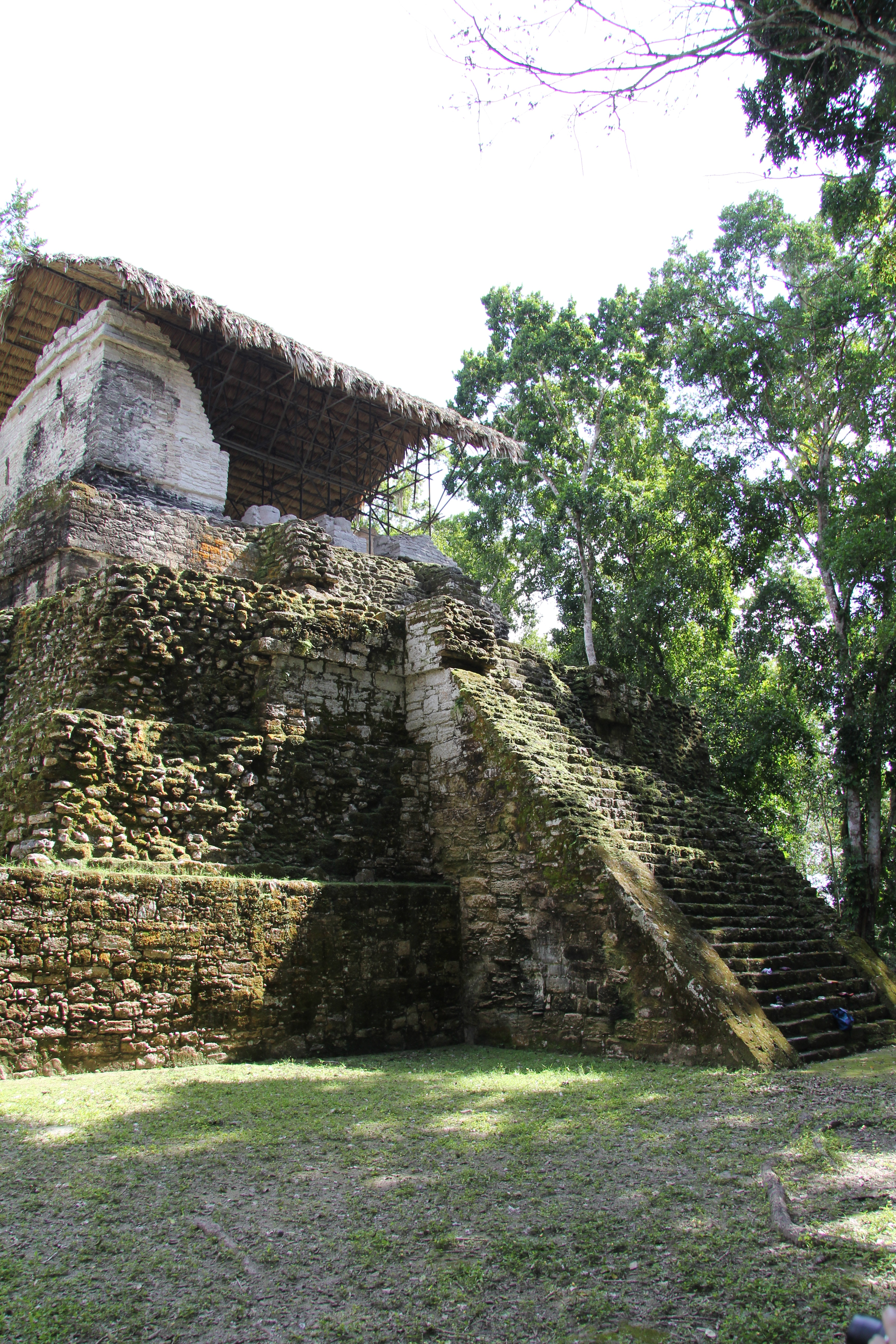
Topoxté was the secondary city of the Ko'woj, it was abandoned before the Spanish conquest

In 1696 the Ko'woj kingdom launched an attack upon Nojpetén. The Itza were able to push the Ko'woj out of Nojpetén, but the city had been significantly damaged.

=== Conquest ===
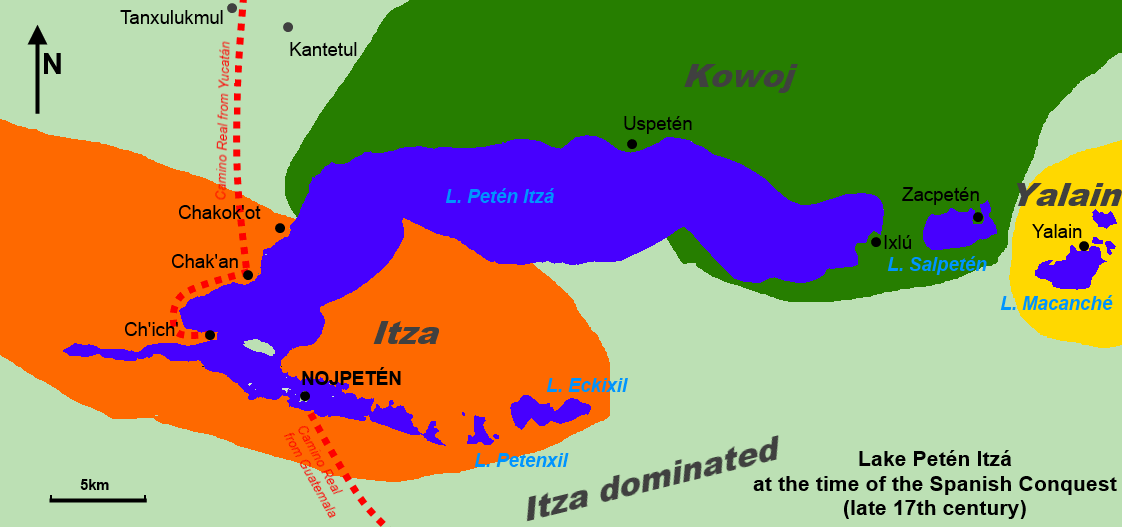
Lake Peten Itza in 1697

Martín de Ursúa arrived at the lakeshore with a Spanish army on 1 March 1697 and built a fortified camp and an attack boat. On 10 March Kan Ek' sent a canoe with a white flag raised bearing emissaries, including the Itza high priest, who offered peaceful surrender. Ursúa received the embassy in peace and invited Kan Ek' to visit his encampment three days later. On the appointed day Kan Ek' failed to arrive; instead Maya warriors amassed both along the shore and in canoes upon the lake. Ursúa decided that any further attempts at peaceful incorporation of the Itza into the Spanish Empire were pointless and a waterbourne assault was launched upon Kan Ek's capital on 13 March. The city fell after a brief but bloody battle in which many Itza warriors died; the Spanish suffered only minor casualties. The surviving Itza abandoned their capital and swam across to the mainland with many dying in the water. Martín de Ursúa planted his standard upon the highest point of the island and renamed Nojpetén as Nuestra Señora de los Remedios y San Pablo, Laguna del Itza ("Our Lady of Remedy and Saint Paul, Lake of the Itza"). Kan Ek' was soon captured with help from the Yalain Maya ruler. Ursúa returned to Mérida, leaving Kan Ek' and other high-ranking members of his family as prisoners of the Spanish garrison at Nuestra Señora de los Remedios y San Pablo. Reinforcements arrived from Santiago de los Caballeros de Guatemala (modern Antigua Guatemala) in 1699 but they did not stay long due to an outbreak of disease. When they returned to the Guatemalan capital they took Kan Ek', his son and two of his cousins with them. The cousins died en route but the last Kan Ek' and his son spent the remainder of their lives under house arrest in the colonial capital.
