= Ah Ulil =

11th-century Maya ruler of Izamal

Ah Ulil or more commonly Ulil was a Maya ruler of Izamal during the eleventh century.

Before Ulil was born his uncle, Ah Tunal saw the invasion of Chichen Itza by the Toltecs. They were led by Ce Acatl Topiltzin, referred to in Maya mythology as Kukulcan. One day Ulil was attacked by a jaguar. He managed to kill it but was seriously wounded. He was saved Ix Xail, sister of Chaka, his most serious rival at pok-ol-pok. While recovering from his wounds he worked with his uncle. Ah Tunal had the task of carving frescoes of the Toltec conquerors Ulil sculpted a jaguar. Later, Ulil's team won the Chichen Itza pok-ol-pok championship. They visited other cities. Kukulcan commissioned a statue of himself to remind the people of his rule while he was away in Tula. During this time there was a drought and Ix Xail was chosen as a sacrifice to the rain god Yum Chac. A large rain storm stopped the drought and saved her.

In 1194 Canek was the king of Chichen Itza. The same day he was elected king he met princess Sac-Nicte. She was 15 years old, they fell in love. But Sac-Nicte was destined to marry Ah Ulil.

Legend says that a young adviser to the princess told Canek that Sac-Nicte would be waiting among green flowers.

The day of the wedding, Canek arrived with 60 of his best warriors and climbed to the altar screaming "Itzalan! Itzalan!" As if he was in the battlefield and stole the princess from the altar. These events may have been one of the things that caused Hunac Ceel to overthrow the government of Chichen Itza.
