= Ceh Pech =

Name of a post-classic Maya ruling family

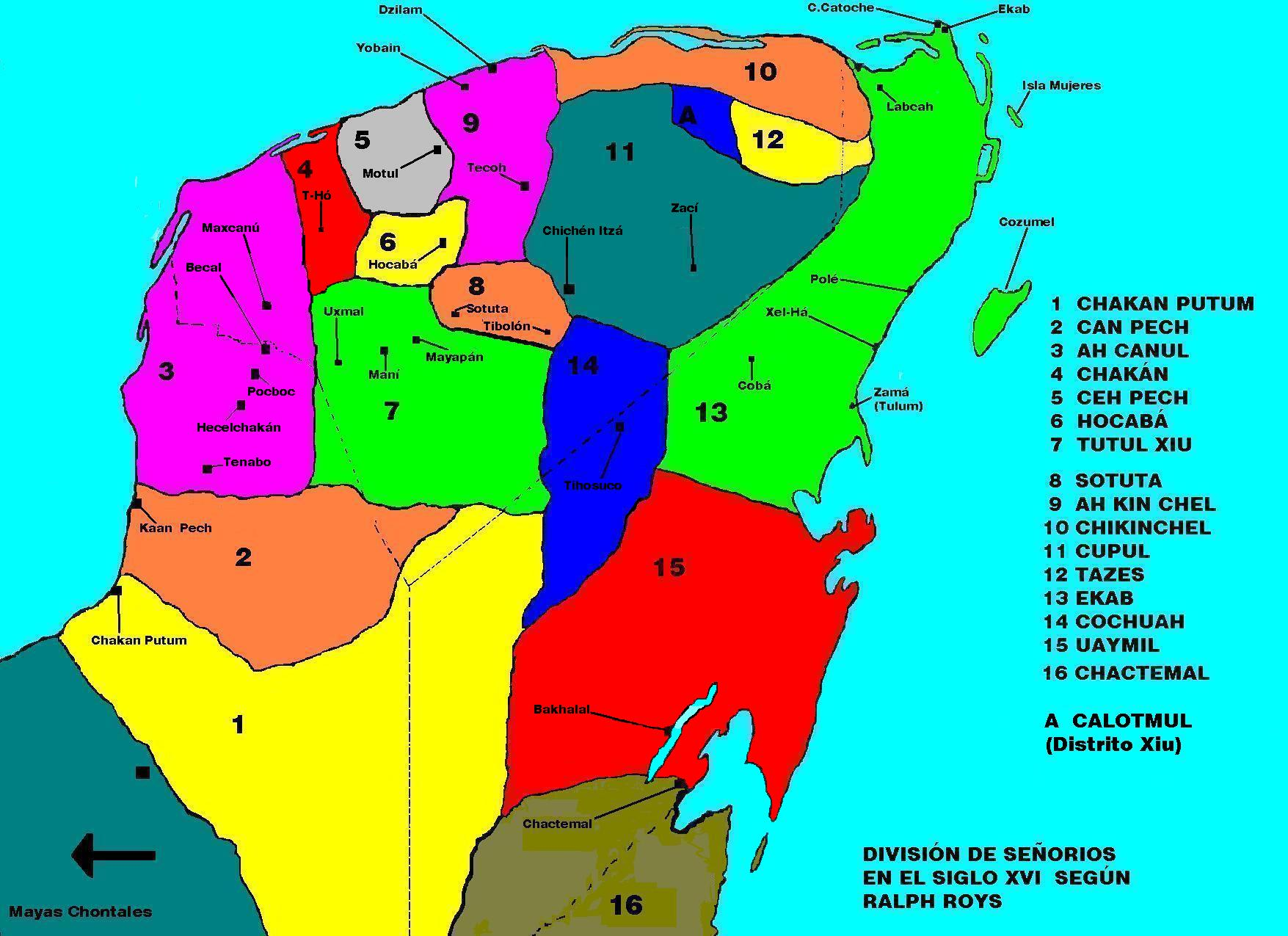
Chiefdoms of Yucatán: Ceh Pech in grey, marked 5

Ceh Pech (pronounced Keh Pech, 'Ceh (deer): patronymic, perhaps Ah Ceh; Pech (tick), perhaps also a patronymic composed of the union of two family names') is the name of a post-classic Maya ruling family and a province, or kuchkabal of the northern Yucatán Peninsula.

It existed before the Spanish conquest of the Yucatán in the 16th century. The Pech family exists to the present day. Other numerous families in the province included the Ek, Chable, Ake (mainly in Nolo), May (mainly in Tixkokob) and Cat.

== History ==
=== 15th century ===
The socio-political dissolution of the League of Mayapan occurred in the mid-15th century, before the arrival of Europeans. 16 jurisdictions ended, who occupied the territory now comprised by the Mexican states of Yucatán, Campeche, and Quintana Roo

Naum Pech is considered to be the founder of the dynasty. He was a relative of the Cocomes dynasty of Mayapan and reigned as the Halach Uinik from 1470 in Motul (now in the Mexican state of Yucatán), the capital of the principality that was named after his family: Ceh Pech.

Other members of the family's lineage of the Pech appeared in other locations such as: Tunal Ah Pech and their children, who settled in Maxtunil, Ah Kom Pech, seated in Xulcumcheel, Nakuk Pech, the batab of Chicxulub Pueblo. Ah Makam Pech, batab of Yaxkukul, and other relatives played leadership roles in the region.

=== 16th century ===
Similar to the Tutul Xiu, the Ceh Pech cooperated early on, although not consistently, with the Spanish conquistadores. At times the Ceh Pech even provided auxiliary troops against principalities of the free Maya, pursuing traditional local policies of enmity. Nevertheless, their capital was conquered in 1538 and they lost their sovereignty. However, the Ceh Pech received recognition of their nobility by the Spanish and were allowed to carry the title of Don, usually reserved for the head of the family. In addition, the family retained their inherent economic and social supremacy over their former estates.

On May 8, 1544 members of the Ceh Pech family sent a letter to the Spanish King Charles V in order to draw attention to their situation.

Between December 25, 1557 and January 6, 1558 Alonso Ortiz de Argueta, the Spanish governor of Yucatán, received homage of Melchor Pech from Chuburna and Francisco Pech from Concal as representatives of their family on the occasion of the accession of Philip II to the throne. In 1567 the Pech family represented the Batab (governor) in 21 of 25 towns in Ceh Pech.

=== Later centuries ===
In 1688 15 adult members of the family are mentioned in tax lists, although a total number of 34 family members were known at that time.

As late as the 17th and 18th century the office of Batab in Yaxkukul, Ixil, Motul, Chuburna and Chicxulub was run by a member of the Pech. In Ixil the Pech possessed by far the largest estates.

== Family Members ==
- Ah Kom Pech
- Ah Makam Pech
- Francisco Pech
- Melchor Pech
- Naum Pech, Halach Huinik in Motul from 1470 onwards
- Nakuk Pech (1490–1562), Batab of Xulub Chen (today's Chicxulub), author of The history of Xulub Chen. (1562)
- Tunal Ah Pech

== See also ==
- History of the Yucatán Peninsula
- Maya civilization
- Maya culture
- Spanish colonization of the Americas
