= Canek (chiefdom) =

Mayan chiefdom of the Yucatán Peninsula

Canek was the name of a Mayan chiefdom of the Yucatán Peninsula, before the arrival of the Spanish conquistadors in the sixteenth century.

== See also ==
- Kan Ek'
