= Chac-Xib-Chac =

- ruler of Chichén Itzá
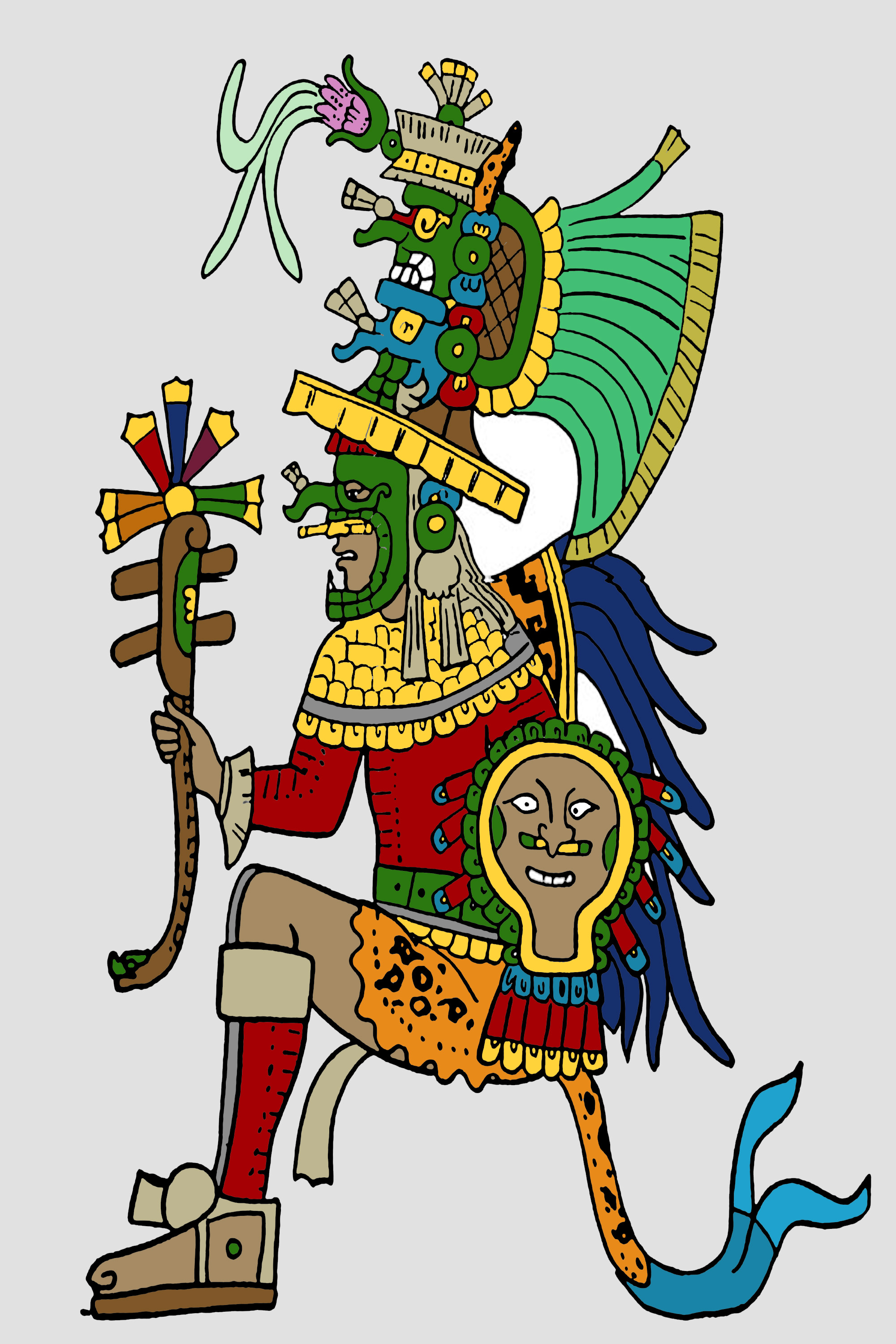
- Reconstructed 2D-portrait of "Chac Xib Chac"
- Reign: 12th century
- Religion: Maya religion
- Occupation: ruler

Chac-Xib-Chac (Maya Glyphs ) is a figure in Maya mythology. He was a ruler of Chichén Itzá. He probably ruled during the plot of Hunac Ceel. He is mentioned several times in the Chilam Balam of Chumayel. Chac-Xib-Chac was said by some scholars to be one of the names of the Red Bacab, and some experts believe that this may actually be the name of the red rain god who lived in the east.

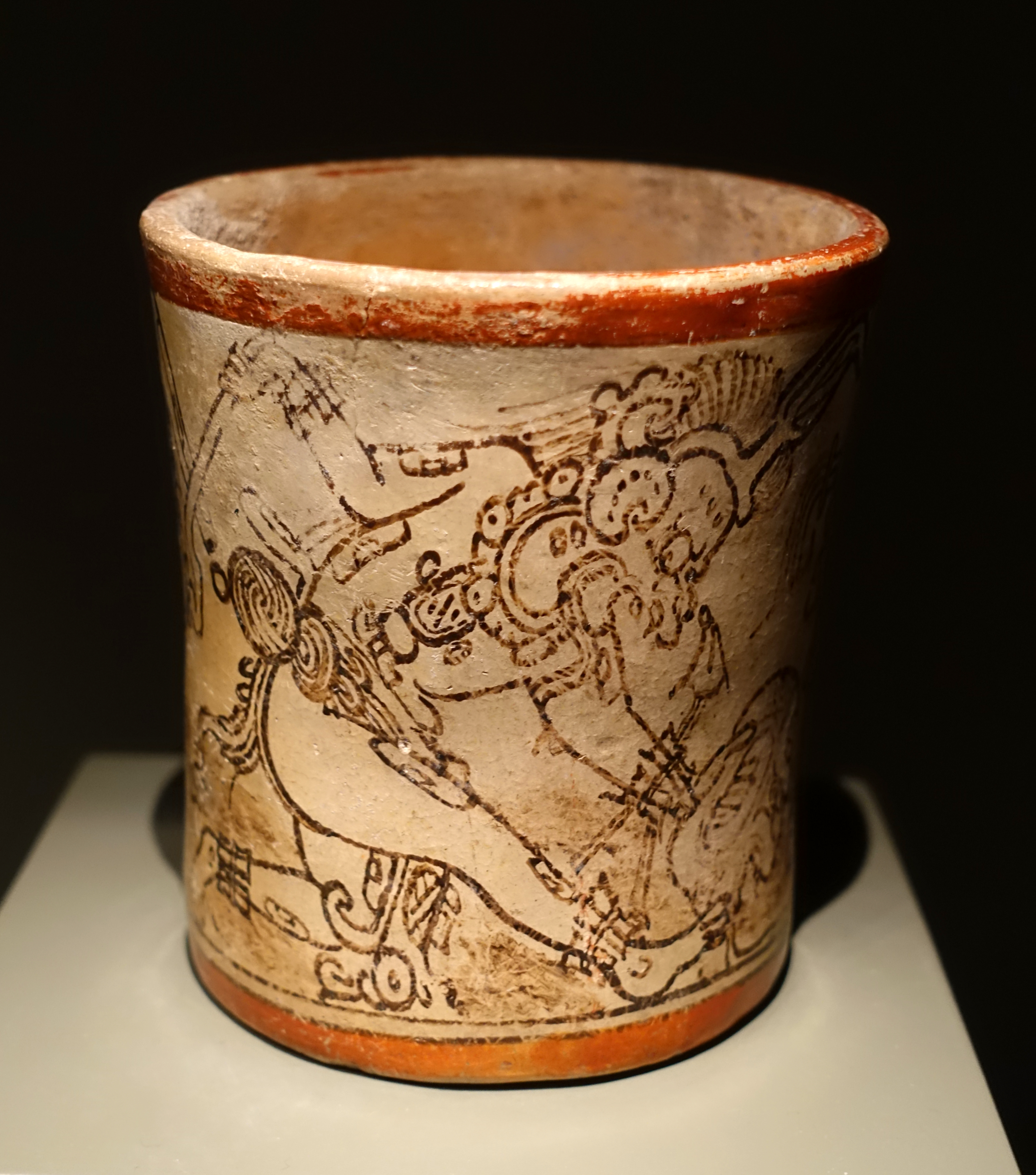
Cylindrical vessel depicting Chac-Xib-Chac and God A in the underworld, Maya, attributed to the Metropolitan Vase Painter, Mexico or Guatemala, Late Classic period, ceramic - Dallas Museum of Art
