= Hunac Ceel =

Postclassic Maya general and king

Hunac Ceel Cauich
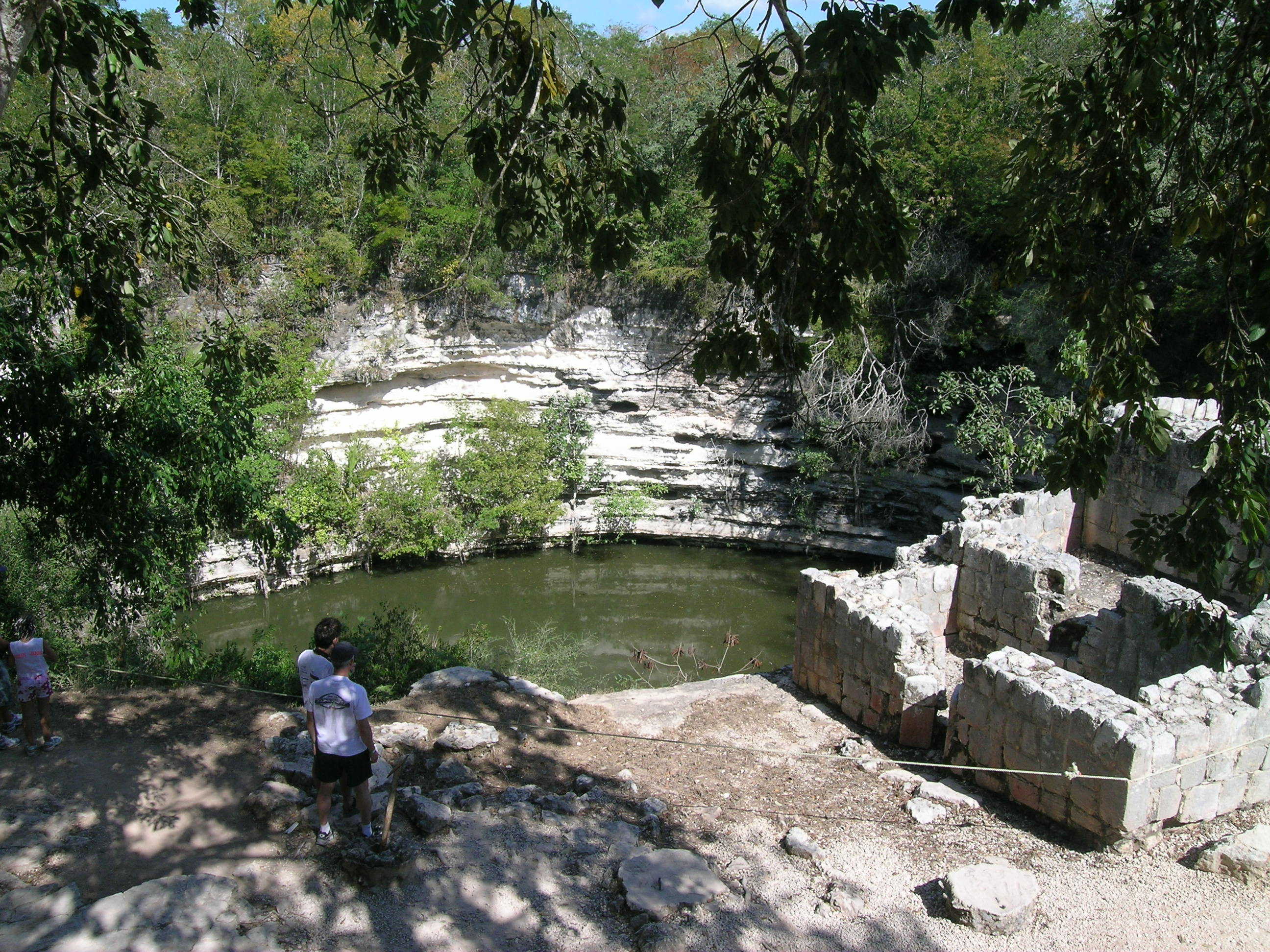
- Sacred Cenote at Chichén Itzá
- Reign: Late 12th century – early 13th century
- Born: 12th century AD; Mayapan
- Died: c. 1210 AD; Mayapan
- Dynasty: Cocom
- Religion: Maya religion
- Occupation: Military leader

Hunac Ceel Cauich (fl. late 12th and early 13th centuries) was a Maya general from Telchaquillo who conquered Chichen Itzá and founded the Cocom dynasty. While the rulers of Chichen Itzá may have been in part descendants of Toltec outsiders who might have been disliked for being foreign oppressors or the war a simple one of conquest, the Maya history attributes the cause of the war to the kidnapping of a wife of a powerful ruler by a powerful lord. (On the other hand, rulers of both the attackers and the attacked are labeled Itzá.)

According to the history, Hunac Ceel, also known as Cauich, unsuccessfully fought the Itzás, having been taken captive. Ah Mex K'uuk threw him into the sacred cenote of Chichén Itzá as a sacrifice to the gods. However, he survived an entire night in the water. He told a prophecy of the rain god Chaac about the year's coming harvest. He went on, under the sponsorship of Ah Mex K'uuk, to become lord of Mayapan, a city which, along with Chichen Itzá and Uxmal, ruled northern Yucatan (Chapter II, "The Rise of Hunac Ceel" in the Chilam Balam of Chumayel. (Note: See translation here) With the assistance of highland forces, he attacked Chichen Itzá, overthrowing the local ruling elite and establishing Mayapan as the sole ruler of the region. Ralph L. Roys, in his commentary on the Book of Chilam Balam of Chumayel posits the interpretation that someone from Chichen Itzá stole away with the bride of Ah Ulil, the ruler of Izamal. Hunac Ceel and his Mexican allies used this as a pretext or reason to sack the city in Izamal's name and to go on to profoundly re-order the entire political landscape (Appendix C: "The Hunac Ceel Episode").

== Legacy ==
Hunac Ceel's actions upset not only the political balance of power in north Yucatan but the demographics of Chichen Itzá and the Lake Petén Itzá area, where the Itzá were still living at the time of European contact.

The feature film Kings of the Sun begins with Hunac Ceel's forces attacking Chichen Itzá. He is played by Leo Gordon.

In the year 2000, the Mexican folk dance and music group Hunac-Ceel was founded in San Luis Potosí.

== Sources ==
The main source describing Hunac Ceel's conspiracy and conquest is the Books of Chilam Balam, especially the Books of Chilam Balam of Mani and of Chumayel, which describe Hunac Ceel as using treachery to drive Chac-Xib-Chac out of Chichen Itzá in the year Tun 10 of Katun 8 Ahau, accompanied by the depopulation of the city and of his rise to power resulting from the event at the cenote.
