= Ah Xiu Xupan =

The kuchkabals of Yucatán after the league. The borders closely resemble those of the provinces that were there before. Calotmul was controlled by Tutul Xiu.

Ah Xiu Xupan (Maya glyphs ) was the last known ruler of the Mayan chiefdom of Tutul-Xiu when it was part of the League of Mayapan.

In 1441, Ah Xiu Xupan, who was the great ruler of Uxmal at that time, was given the task of starting a war with the royal family of Cocom, which founded Tibolón. He managed to kill everyone except for one Cocom survivor. The war between Uxmal and Cocom plunged the league into chaos; there was segregation in the provinces and several uprisings broke out. By 1461, the league had completely disintegrated.

After the war, Yucatán was divided into sixteen kuchkabals.
