= Tutul-Xiu =

Mayan chiefdom

Kuchkabal Tutul Xiu
- 1441–1547
- Kuchkabals of Yucatan after 1461.
- Capital: Maní
- Common languages: Official language: Yucatec
- Religion: Maya religion
- Government: Monarchy
- Halach Uinik
- Historical era: post classic / Early Modern
  - Established: 1441
  - Disestablished: 1547
Preceded by	Succeeded by
League of Mayapan	New Spain

Tutul-Xiu (Mayan pronunciation: [tutul ʃíːw]), also Tutul Xiues or Mani, was the name of a Mayan chiefdom of the central Yucatán Peninsula with capital in Maní, before the arrival of the Spanish conquistadors in the sixteenth century. The name "Tutul-Xiu" was said to be of "Mexican" (Nahuatl) origin, xiu meaning "herbaceous plant". Besides the ruling Xiu family, other numerous lineages in the province included the Na, Ku, Dzul, Tun, Cime and Uluac.

== Earlier history ==
In later accounts the Cocom family are stated to have founded Mayapan in the Yucatán Peninsula. However earlier accounts state that the earliest rulers were the Xiu. They held dominance in the settlement for the first century of its existence (c. 1180–1280). This period is marked by an increasing number of stelae being dedicated to mark the end of k'atun periods, perhaps inspired by practices in the city of Uxmal. During this time Mayapan worked cooperatively with Uxmal and also Chichen Itza, which by this point had entered its decline.

The Xiu gradually lost control of Mayapan, which was in the hands of the Cocom and their Canul mercenaries by 1300. In c. 1400 the Cocom expelled a large number of Xiu from the settlement. However the Xiu plotted revenge and in 1441 revolted against the Cocom. One party, led by Ah Xiu Xupan and assisted by mercenaries from elsewhere in Pre-Columbian Mexico, killed all members of the Cocom in Mayapan. There was only one significant survivor of that family, who was away on a trading mission. Archaeological excavations have shown evidence of burnt structures, ceremonial deposits and human bones from this period. The destruction led to the decline of the cities of Northern Yucatán. The leading families of Mayapan left to found new settlements and Yucatán fragmented into 18 petty kingdoms. The Chel established themselves at Tecoh, the surviving Cocom at Tibolon and the Xiu at Mani.

== During the Spanish conquest ==
The Xiu were among the most willing allies of the Spanish, who counted the Capul and Cocom among their fiercest opponents. The Xiu later claimed to have submitted to the Spanish because of prophecies foretelling their arrival but their cooperation seems to have been motivated by the possibility of Spanish assistance against the Cocom, as the rivalry had intensified. The first ambassadors from the Xiu met with Spanish conquistador Francisco de Montejo the Younger at Tuchi-caan, around 1539. In 1547 a Spanish mission was established at Mani, the Xiu capital. The Mani Land Treaty of 1557 resolved a border dispute between the Xiu of Mani, the Cocom of Sotuta and the Copul.
