= Kan Ekʼ =

Maya royal honorific

Kan Ekʼ (sometimes spelt Canek or Kanek) was the name or title used by the Itza Maya kings at their island capital Nojpetén upon Lake Petén Itzá in the Petén Department of Guatemala. The full title was Aj Kan Ekʼ or Ajaw Kan Ekʼ , and in some studies Kan Ekʼ is used as the name of the Late Postclassic (c. 1200 to 1697) Petén Itza polity.

The earliest known use of the title comes from a Maya stela at the archaeological site of Yaxchilan and dates to the mid 8th century AD. The name is recorded in inscriptions at widely spaced Maya cities including Seibal, Motul de San José and Chichen Itza. When Spanish conquistador Hernán Cortés crossed Petén in the early 16th century, he met with an Itza king identified by the name Kan Ekʼ. The Itza were not contacted again until the early 17th century when Franciscan friars were initially welcomed by the current Aj Kan Ekʼ before being expelled. This was followed by several incidents in which attempts to interact with the Itza resulted in the slaughter of the Spanish and their Maya converts, resulting in a long lull before attempts were resumed with a new Kan Ekʼ in the closing years of the 17th century. These culminated in a bloody battle, after which the last Kan Ekʼ was captured; he spent the rest of his life under arrest in the colonial capital of the Captaincy General of Guatemala.

== Etymology ==
The two elements in the Kan Ekʼ name represent surnames taken from the mother's and father's lineage respectively. In Petén during the Postclassic period a person belonged to two lineage groups. The individual's chʼibal group was determined by their father's lineage and their tzʼakab group was determined by their mother's lineage group. Individuals simultaneously inherited their surname and property from the father's lineage group and a surname, titles and religious leanings from the lineage group of their mother. Maya rulers were members of royal lineage groups and the kan element of the king's name was inherited from the royal tzʼakab while the Ekʼ' element was derived from the royal chʼibal ʼ. Due to this, all the Itza kings of Petén bore the name Kan Ekʼ. Among the Itza, kan ekʼ meant "serpent star"; it may also have had a secondary meaning of "sky star" (kaʼan ekʼ ).

== Polity ==
At the time of the Spanish conquest of Petén in 1697, the Kan Ekʼ kingdom was one of the three dominant polities in the central Petén Basin.

== History ==
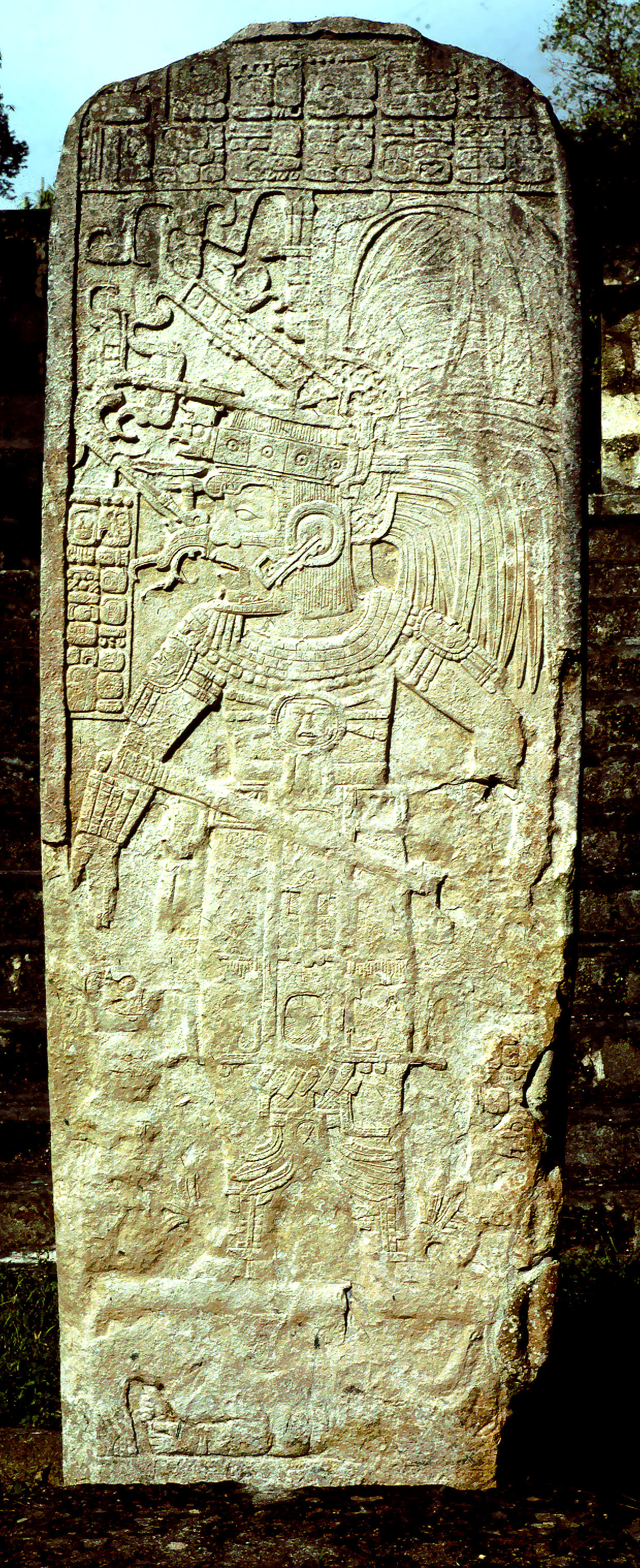
The Kan Ekʼ name is recorded in the hieroglyphic text on Seibal Stela 11

The Kan Ekʼ name is recorded as being used by a king of Motul de San José, just north of Lake Petén Itzá, as far back as the Late Classic period (c. AD 600-900) of Mesoamerican chronology. Kan Ekʼ is mentioned in a hieroglyphic text dated to AD 766 upon Stela 10 at Yaxchilan on the west bank of the Usumacinta River. At Seibal, on the Pasión River, Stela 10, dating to 849 AD, has an inscription naming Kan Ekʼ as ruler of Motul de San José, which is recorded as being one of the four paramount polities in the mid-9th century, along with Calakmul, Tikal and Seibal itself. The name is also recorded on Seibal Stela 11, erected at the same time as Stela 10; it is additionally contained within inscriptions at the Great Ballcourt of Chichen Itza in Yucatán, which date to the Late Classic period.

=== Early 16th century ===
In 1525, after the Spanish conquest of the Aztec Empire, Hernán Cortés led an expedition to Honduras over land, cutting across the Itza kingdom en route. His aim was to subdue the rebellious Cristóbal de Olid, whom he had sent to conquer Honduras, but Cristóbal de Olid had set himself up independently on his arrival in that territory. Cortés arrived at the north shore of Lake Petén Itzá on 13 March 1525; he was met there by the Aj Kan Ekʼ. The Roman Catholic priests accompanying the expedition celebrated mass in the presence of Kan Ekʼ, who was said to be so impressed that he pledged to worship the Cross and to destroy his idols. Cortés accepted an invitation from the king to visit Nojpetén, and crossed to the Maya city with a small contingent of Spanish soldiers while the rest of his army continued around the lake to meet him on the south shore. Cortés left behind a lame horse that the Itza treated as a deity, attempting to feed it poultry, meat and flowers but the animal soon died.

=== Early 17th century ===
Following Cortés' visit, no Spanish attempted to visit the warlike Itza inhabitants of Nojpetén for almost a hundred years. In 1618 two Franciscan friars set out from Mérida in Yucatán on a mission to attempt the peaceful conversion of the still pagan Itza in central Petén. Bartolomé de Fuensalida and Juan de Orbita were accompanied by the alcalde of Bacalar (a Spanish colonial official) and some Christianised Maya. After an arduous six-month journey the travellers were well received by the current Kan Ekʼ. They stayed at Nojpetén for some days in an attempt to evangelise the Itza but the Aj Kan Ekʼ refused to renounce his Maya religion, although he showed interest in the masses held by the Catholic missionaries. Kan Ekʼ informed them that according to ancient Itza prophecy it was not yet time for them to convert to Christianity. In the time since Cortés had visited Nojpetén, the Itza had made a statue of the deified horse. Juan de Orbita was outraged when he saw the idol and he immediately smashed it into pieces. Fuensalida was able to save the lives of the visitors from the infuriated natives by means of a particularly eloquent sermon that resulted in them being forgiven. Attempts to convert the Itza failed and the friars left Nojpetén on friendly terms with Kan Ekʼ.

The friars returned in 1619, arriving in October and staying for eighteen days. Again Kan Ekʼ welcomed them in a friendly manner; however the Maya priesthood were hostile and jealous of the missionaries' influence upon the king. They persuaded Kan Ek's wife to convince him to expel the unwelcome visitors. The missionaries' lodgings were surrounded by armed warriors and the friars and their accompanying servants were escorted to a waiting canoe and instructed to leave and never come back. Juan de Orbita attempted to resist and was rendered unconscious by an Itza warrior. The missionaries were expelled without food or water but survived the journey back to Mérida.

=== Interlude ===
In 1622 Captain Francisco de Mirones set out from Yucatán to launch an assault upon the Itza. His army was later joined by Franciscan friar Diego Delgado. En route to Nojpetén, Delgado believed that the army's treatment of the Maya was excessively cruel and he left the army to make his own way to Nojpetén with eighty Christianised Maya from Tipu. When the party arrived at Nojpetén, they were all seized and sacrificed to the Maya gods. Soon afterwards, the Itza caught Mirones and his soldiers off guard and unarmed in the church at Sacalum; they were slaughtered to a man. These events ended all Spanish attempts to contact the Itza until 1695.

=== Late 17th century ===
In 1695 the governor of Yucatán, Martín de Ursúa y Arizmendi, began to build a road from Campeche south towards Petén. Franciscan Andrés de Avendaño followed the new road as far as possible then continued towards Nojpetén with local Maya guides. They arrived at the western end of Lake Petén Itzá to an enthusiastic welcome by the local Itza. The following day, the current Aj Kan Ekʼ travelled across the lake with eighty canoes to greet the visitors. The Franciscans returned to Nojpetén with Kan Ekʼ and baptised over 300 Itza children over the following four days. Avendaño tried to convince Kan Ekʼ to convert to Christianity and surrender to the Spanish crown, without success. The king of the Itza, like his forebear, cited Itza prophecy and said the time was not yet right. He asked the Spanish to return in four months, at which time the Itza would convert and swear fealty to the King of Spain. Kan Ekʼ learnt of a plot by a rival Itza group to ambush and kill the Franciscans and the Itza king advised them to return to Mérida via Tipu. The Spanish friars became lost and suffered great hardships but eventually arrived back in Mérida after a month travelling.

Kan Ekʼ sent emissaries to Mérida in December 1695 to inform Martín de Ursúa that the Itza would peacefully submit to Spanish rule. A Spanish party led by Captain Pedro de Zubiaur arrived at Lake Petén Itza with 60 soldiers, friar San Buenaventura and allied Yucatec Maya warriors. Although they expected a peaceful welcome they were immediately attacked by approximately 2000 Maya warriors. San Buenaventura and one of his Franciscan companions, a Spanish soldier and a number of Yucatec Maya warriors were taken prisoner. Spanish reinforcements arrived the next day but were beaten back. This turn of events convinced Martín de Ursúa that Kan Ekʼ would not surrender peacefully and he began to organise an all-out assault on Nojpetén.

Martín de Ursúa arrived at the lakeshore with a Spanish army on 1 March 1697 and built a fortified camp and an attack boat. On 10 March Kan Ekʼ sent a canoe with a white flag raised bearing emissaries, including the Itza high priest, who offered peaceful surrender. Ursúa received the embassy in peace and invited Kan Ekʼ to visit his encampment three days later. On the appointed day Kan Ekʼ failed to arrive; instead Maya warriors amassed both along the shore and in canoes upon the lake. Ursúa decided that any further attempts at peaceful incorporation of the Itza into the Spanish Empire were pointless and a waterbourne assault was launched upon Kan Ek's capital on 13 March. The city fell after a brief but bloody battle in which many Itza warriors died; the Spanish suffered only minor casualties. The surviving Itza abandoned their capital and swam across to the mainland with many dying in the water. Martín de Ursúa planted his standard upon the highest point of the island and renamed Nojpetén as Nuestra Señora de los Remedios y San Pablo, Laguna del Itza ("Our Lady of Remedy and Saint Paul, Lake of the Itza"). Kan Ekʼ was soon captured with help from the Yalain Maya ruler. Ursúa returned to Mérida, leaving Kan Ekʼ and other high-ranking members of his family as prisoners of the Spanish garrison at Nuestra Señora de los Remedios y San Pablo. Reinforcements arrived from Santiago de los Caballeros de Guatemala (modern Antigua Guatemala) in 1699 but they did not stay long due to an outbreak of disease. When they returned to the Guatemalan capital they took Kan Ekʼ, his son and two of his cousins with them. The cousins died en route but the last Kan Ekʼ and his son spent the remainder of their lives under house arrest in the colonial capital.
