= Cocom =

Postclassic Maya dynasty

The Cocom or Cocomes were a Maya family or dynasty who controlled the Yucatán Peninsula in the late Postclassic period. Their capital was at Mayapan. The dynasty was founded by Hunac Ceel, and was overthrown sometime between 1440 and 1441 by Ah Xupan of the Xiu lineage. Most of the family was massacred and there was said to only be one survivor who was travelling in Honduras at the time. However, they ultimately survived and founded the kuchkabal of Sotuta, and were also present in Hocaba-Homun.

The Cocom family continued to live as a leading political power, even in modern-day Yucatan as official political representatives.
