= Izamal =

City in the Mexican state of Yucatán

- City
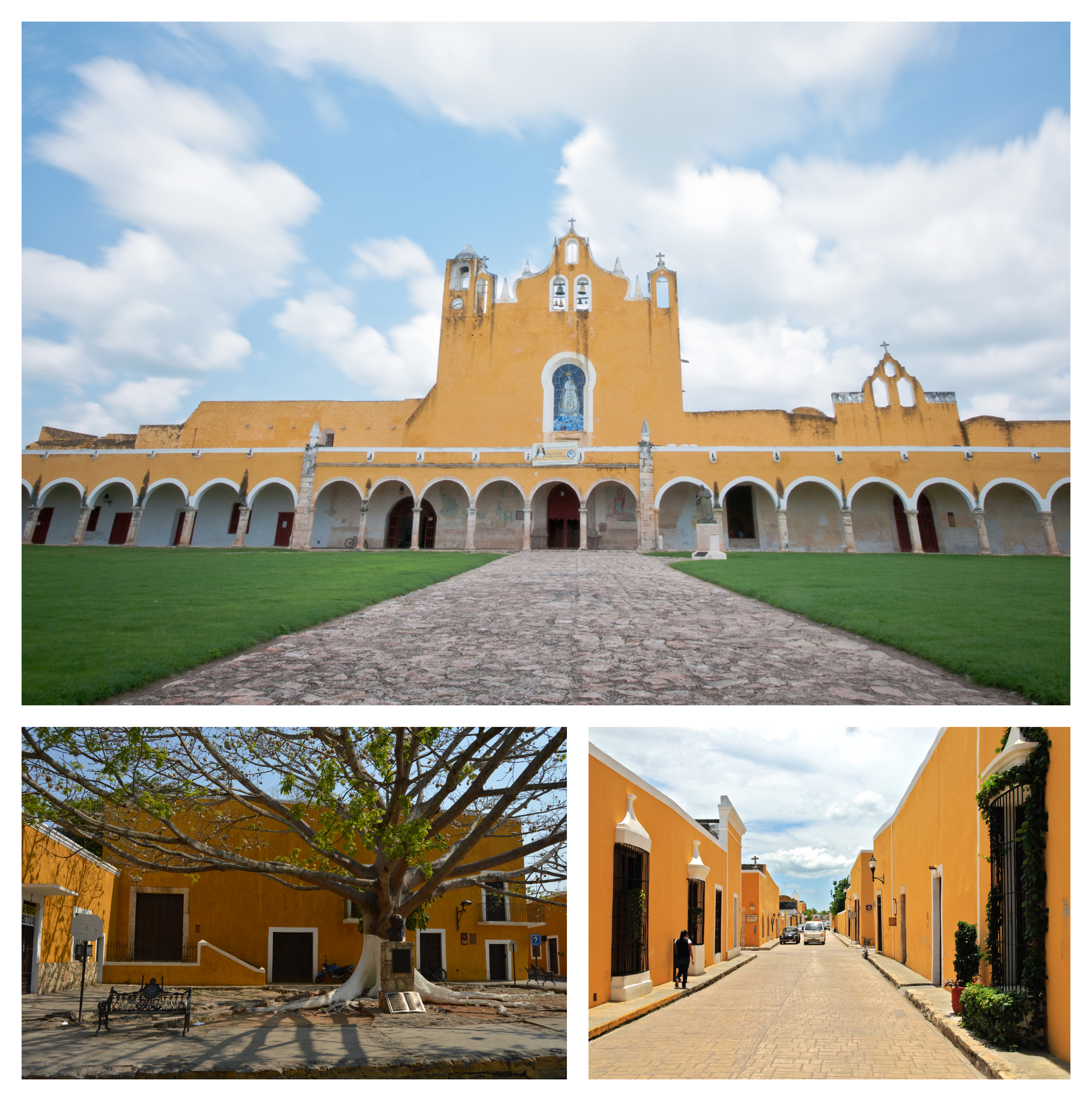
- Nicknames: The Yellow City, The City of Three Cultures
- Location of Izamal, Yucatan
- Coordinates: 20°55′53″N 89°01′04″W
- Country: Mexico
- State: Yucatán
- Municipality: Izamal
- City Founded: December 4, 1841
- Elevation: 13 m (43 ft)

Population (INEGI, 2005)
  - Total: 15,101
- Time zone: UTC-6 (Central)
- ZIP code: 97540
- Area code: 988
- INEGI Code: 310400001
- Website: www.izamal.gob.mx

Izamal (Spanish: [isaˈmal]) is a small city in the Mexican state of Yucatán, 72 kilometres (45 mi) east of state capital Mérida, in southern Mexico.

Izamal was continuously occupied throughout most of Mesoamerican chronology; in 2000, the city's estimated population was 15,000 people. Izamal is known in Yucatán as the Yellow City (most of its buildings are painted yellow) and the City of Hills (that actually are the remains of ancient temple pyramids). It is one of the oldest continuously inhabited cities in the Americas as well as in the World.

== Pre-Columbian Izamal ==
Izamal is an important archaeological site of the Pre-Columbian Maya civilization. It is probably the biggest city of the Northern Yucatec Plains, covering a minimal urban extension of 53 square kilometres (20 sq mi). Its monumental buildings exceed 1,000,000 cubic meters of constructive volume and at least two raised causeways, known by their Mayan term sacbeob, connect it with other important centers, Ruins of Ake, located 29 kilometres (18 mi) to the west and Kantunil, 18 kilometers to the south, evidencing the religious, political and economic power of this political unit over a territory of more than 5,000 square kilometres (1,900 sq mi) in extension. Izamal developed a particular constructive technique involving use of megalithic carved blocks, with defined architectonical characteristics like rounded corners, projected mouldings and thatched roofs at superstructures, which also appeared in other important urban centers within its hinterland, such as Ake, Uci and Dzilam.

The city was founded during the Late Formative Period (750–200 BC) and was continuously occupied until the Spanish Conquest. The most important constructive activity stage spans between Protoclassic (200 BC – 200 AD) and Late Classic (600–800 AD). It was partially abandoned with the rise of Chichen Itza in the Terminal Classic (800–1000 A.D.) until the end of the Precolumbian era, when Izamal was considered a site of pilgrimages in the region, rivaled only by Chichen Itza. Its principal temples were sacred to the creator deity Itzamna and to the Sun god Kinich Ahau.

Five huge Pre-Columbian structures are still easily visible at Izamal (and two from some distance away in all directions). The first is a great pyramid to the Maya Sun god, Kinich Kak Moo (macaw of the solar fire face) with a base covering over 2 acres (8,000 m^{2}) of ground and a volume of some 700,000 cubic meters. Atop this grand base is a pyramid of ten levels. To the south-east lies another great temple, called Itzamatul, and placed at the south of what was a main plaza, another huge building, called Ppap Hol Chak, was partially destroyed with the construction of a Franciscan temple during the 16th century.

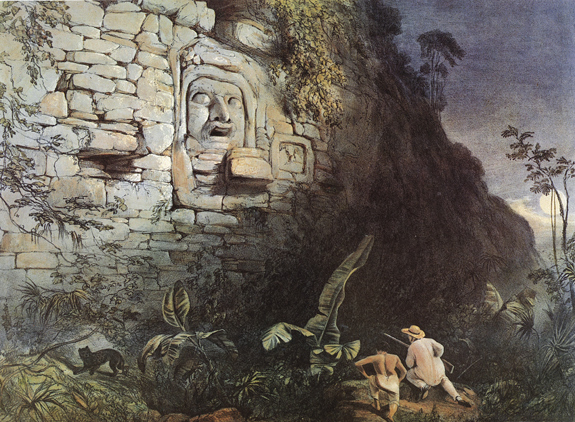
Izamal, colossal Maya stucco head set in a wall, after Catherwood

The south-west side of the plaza is partially limited by another pyramid, the Hun Pik Tok, and in the west lie the remains of the temple known as Kabul, where a great stucco mask still existed on one side as recently as the 1840s, as seen in a colored lithograph after a drawing by Frederick Catherwood. All these large man-made mounds probably were built up over several centuries and originally supported city palaces and temples. Other important residential buildings which have been restored and can be visited are Xtul (The Rabbit), Habuc and Chaltun Ha.

After more than a decade of archaeological work done by Mexican archaeologists at Izamal, over 163 archaeologically important structures have been found there, and thousands of residential structures at surrounding communities have been located.

Hydrologically, the urban center relied on an extensive network of subterranean chultuns and modified karst sinkholes to store rainwater, sustaining its dense population across the dry northern Yucatecan plain.

== Spanish Colonial era ==
After the Spanish conquest of Yucatán in the 16th century, a Spanish colonial city was founded atop the existing Maya one. However, due to the immense effort required to level the two massive structures, the Spanish opted to place a small Christian temple atop the great pyramid and construct a large Franciscan Monastery on the acropolis. It was named after San Antonio de Padua. Completed in 1561, the open atrium of the Monastery is still today second in size only to that at the Vatican. Most of the cut stone from the Pre-Columbian city was reused to build the Spanish churches, monastery, and surrounding buildings.

Izamal was the first seat of the Bishops of Yucatán before they were moved to Mérida. The fourth Bishop of Yucatán, Diego de Landa lived here.

== Modern history ==
The town of Izamal was first granted the status of city by the government of Yucatán on 4 December 1841. On 13 August 1923 it was demoted to town status. It regained its status as a city on 1 December 1981.

For much of the 19th and 20th centuries, the henequen industry formed the basis of Izamal's economy. When that industry declined in the 1960s, the municipal and state government began efforts to turn Izamal into a tourist destination, transforming the city's appearance in the process. Izamal's buildings owe their distinctive color scheme to Jorge Carlos González Rodríguez, mayor of Izamal from 1959 to 1961, who ordered the removal of the commercial signs that blighted the facades and rooftops of many buildings at the time, and the painting of those buildings in yellow and white. In 1965, Governor of Yucatán Luis Torres Mesías ordered the demolition of several buildings surrounding the San Antonio de Padua convent. He and his successor Carlos Loret de Mola Mediz also oversaw the conversion of Plaza Zamná from a public market into a park.

Pope John Paul II visited Izamal in August 1993, where he performed a mass and presented the statue of the Virgin with a silver crown.. This vist was part of his second pastoral trip to Mexico, where he met with representatives of Indigenous peoples at the Convent of San Antonio de Padua. In his address, he emphasized the dignity and rights of Indigenous communities across the Americas and criticized historical efforts to suppress their cultures, calling for greater respect and support.

== Present day ==
Izamal remains a place of pilgrimage within the state of Yucatán, now for the veneration of Roman Catholic saints. Several saints statues at Izamal are said to perform miracles. An early colonial era statue of the Virgin of the Immaculate Conception ("Our Lady of Izamal") is particularly venerated, and is the state's patron saint.

The Yucatec Maya language is still heard at least as much as Spanish in Izamal. It is the first language in the homes of the majority of the people. Most signs are in both languages.

Major Fiestas are held in Izamal on April 3, May 3, August 15, and December 8.

Izamal is the home of a distillery which produces an eponymous mezcal from the hearts of the locally grown agave plants.

Izamal was named a "Pueblo Mágico" in 2002.

== Geography ==
=== Climate ===
Climate data for Izamal
Month	Jan	Feb	Mar	Apr	May	Jun	Jul	Aug	Sep	Oct	Nov	Dec	Year
Mean daily maximum °C (°F)	30.1 (86.2)	31.3 (88.3)	33.2 (91.8)	35.2 (95.4)	35.7 (96.3)	34.7 (94.5)	33.8 (92.8)	33.7 (92.7)	33.7 (92.7)	32.3 (90.1)	31 (88)	30.4 (86.7)	32.9 (91.2)
Mean daily minimum °C (°F)	17.0 (62.6)	17 (63)	18.5 (65.3)	20.2 (68.4)	21.5 (70.7)	22.1 (71.8)	21.7 (71.1)	21.9 (71.4)	21.8 (71.2)	20.6 (69.1)	19.3 (66.7)	18 (64)	20 (68)
Average precipitation mm (inches)	38 (1.5)	30 (1.2)	20 (0.8)	23 (0.9)	81 (3.2)	140 (5.6)	130 (5.2)	160 (6.4)	190 (7.4)	97 (3.8)	33 (1.3)	30 (1.2)	980 (38.5)
Source: Weatherbase

== Gallery ==
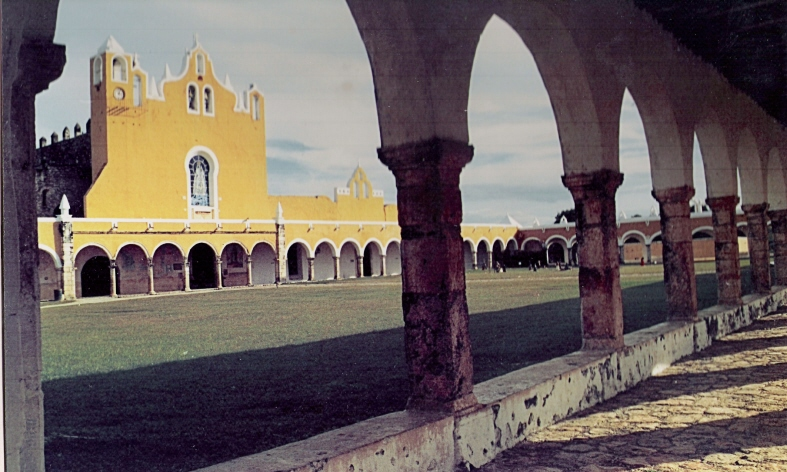
Main arcade of convent and church entrance

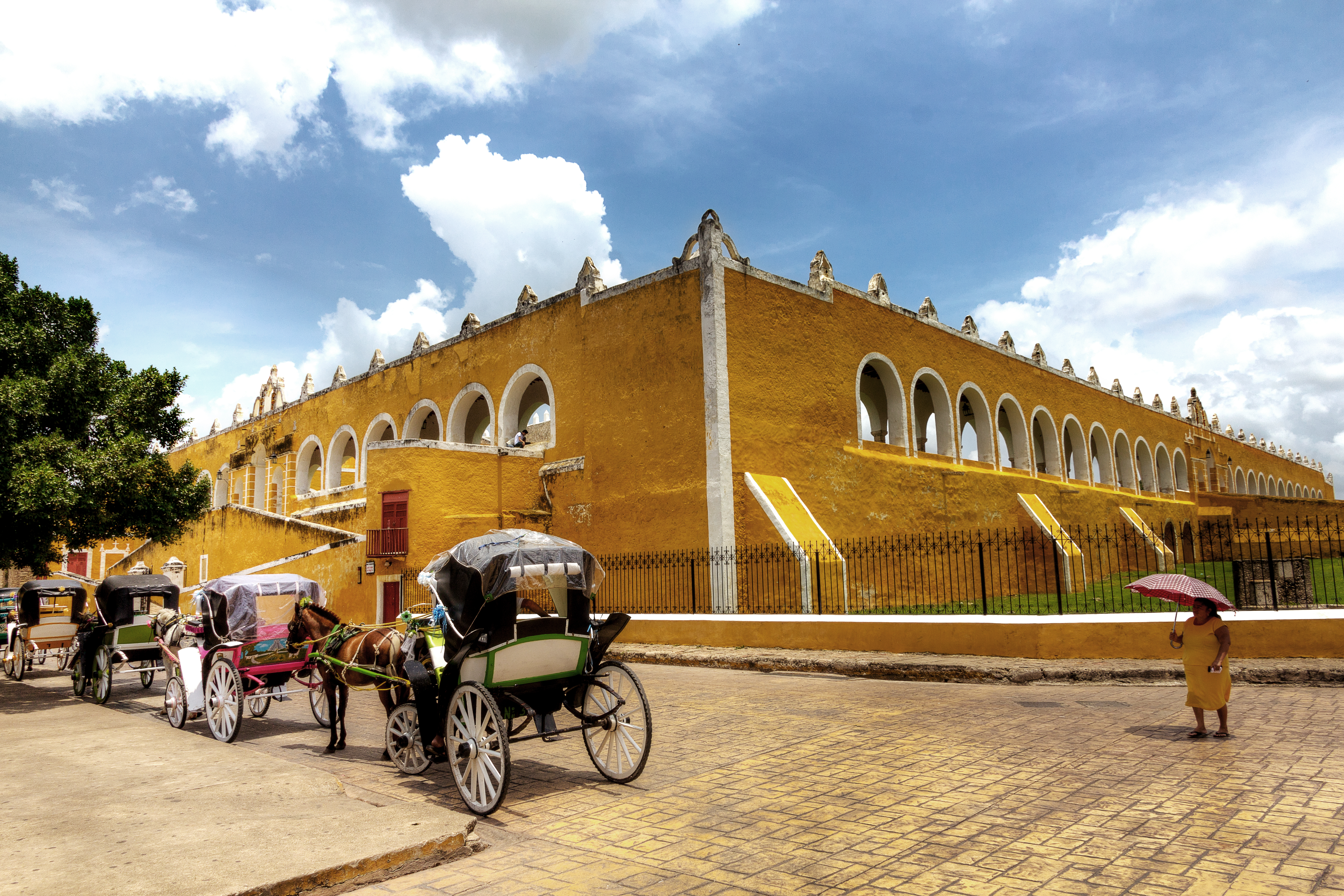
Real-life scene in front of Convento de San Antonio

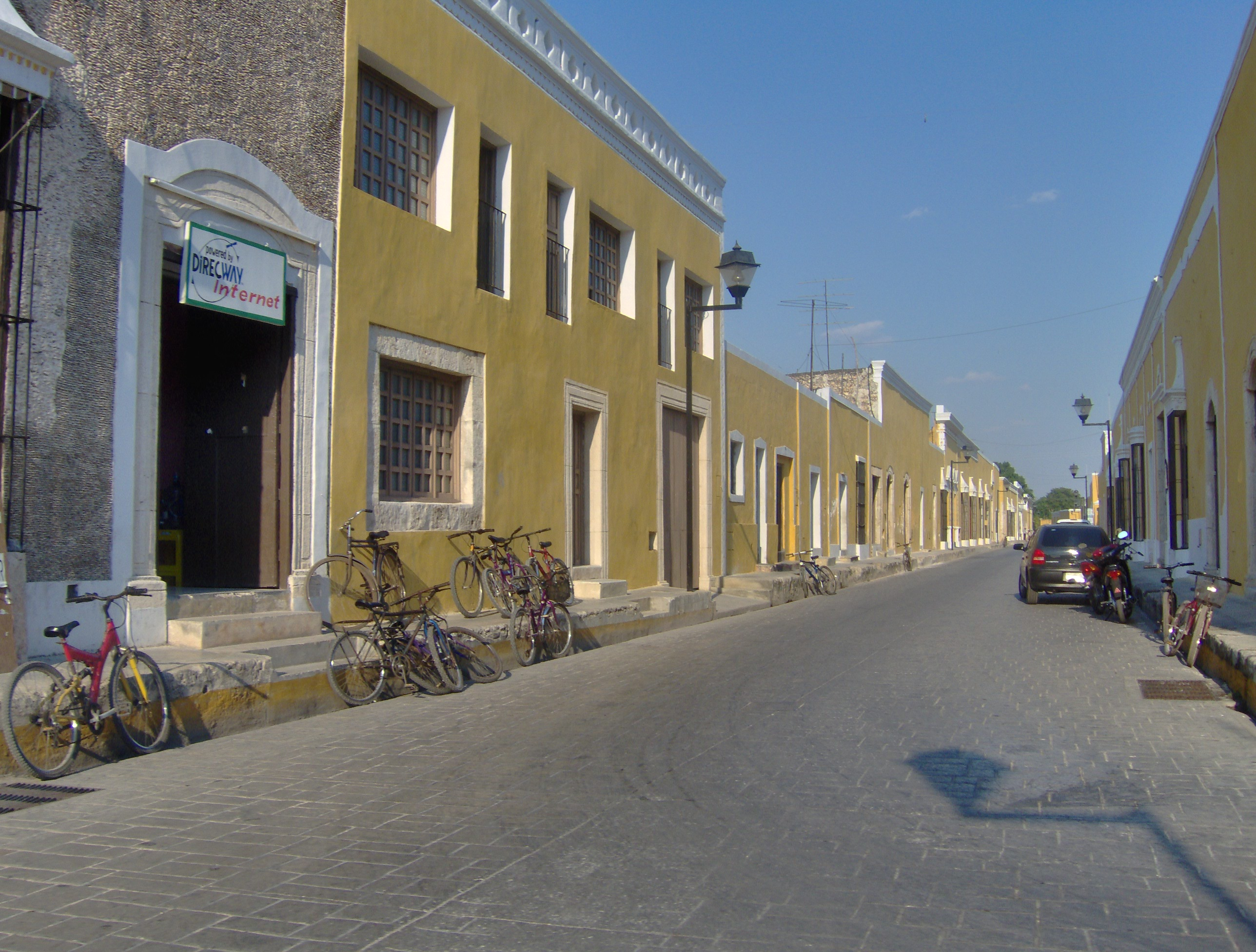
The placid streets of Izamal

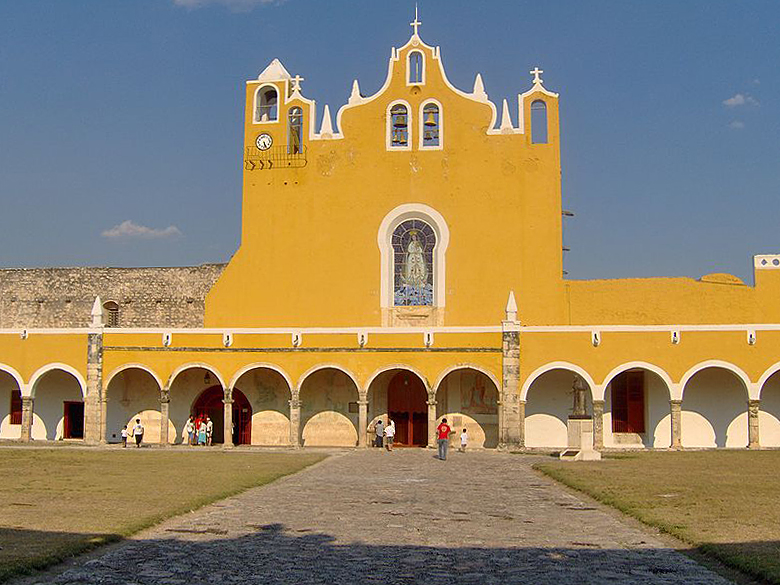
Monastery facade

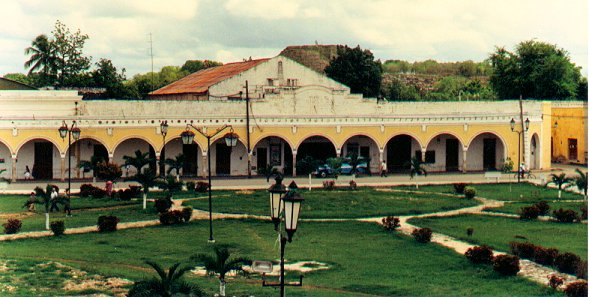
Arcade with pyramid in background

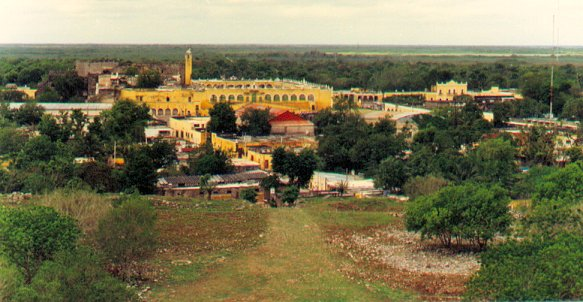
Convent as viewed from atop Kinich Kak Mo pyramid
