= Ah Kin Chel =

Mayan polity

Kuchkabal Ah Kin Chel
- 1441–1547
- Capital: Tecoh
- Religion: Maya religion
- Government: Monarchy
- Halach Uinik
  - 1441-?: Mo-Chel
  - 1527-1547: Namux Chel
- Historical era: Post classic and Early modern
  - Mo-Chel flees Mayapan with his followers to Tecoh where he establishes an independent state: 1441
  - Spanish conquest of Yucatán: 1547
Preceded by	Succeeded by
League of Mayapan	New Spain

Ah Kin Chel was the name of a Maya chiefdom or Kuchkabal of the northern Yucatán Peninsula, before the arrival of the Spanish conquistadors in the 16th century.

Ah Kin Chel was founded with the capital at Tecoh in 1441 by Mo-Chel when the League of Mayapan collapsed and was divided into seventeen nations.

== History ==
=== Before Mo-Chel ===
In the mid 9th century, Maya civilization began to collapse. In the early 10th century, Yucatán was divided into many different polities. At this time Ce Acatl Topiltzin Tlatoani of the Toltec Empire conquered the Yucatán Peninsula. Toltec control however did not last long. In 987 Ah Mekat Tutul Xiu united the cities of Uxmal, Mayapan, and Chichen Itza to form the League of Mayapan. The League was a confederation of Maya polities, which promised peace, and many cities joined it. Most places joined of their own free will. Izamal was the fifth city to join, but Tecoh was conquered by Kʼakʼupakal, one of the four k’ul kokom (rulers) of Chichen Itza, as well as the head of the Itza military. Yawahal Cho Chak and Hun Pik Tok May were two of the other k’ul kokom. Prior to the collapse of the League, Izamal was the main city of the province which later became Ah Kin Chel.

=== Independence ===
Mo-Chel was the first Halach Uinik of Ah Kin Chel. He started the rule of the Chel family and the political state ruled by them. He was originally a nobleman, the son in law of one of the principal priests at Mayapan. Another priest Ah Xupan Nauat married his daughter Namox Chel to Mo. Mo-Chel is said to have foreseen the destruction of the League of Mayapan, and he fled with some followers to Tecoh near Izamal, where he established an independent state. He named the nation Ah Kin (high priest, literally means is from the sun) Chel (from his last name, a way of naming used by many Kuchkabal). Soon afterwards the League of Mayapan descended into a civil war between the Cocom and the Tutul-Xiu. The war started in 1441 and ended with the destruction of Mayapan and the League fracturing into seventeen states called Kuchkabal in 1461.

The Chel family remained in rule until the end of Ah Kin Chel. Namux Chel, the last ruler, was already in power in 1527 when Francisco de Montejo visited. To avoid conflict he allowed the Spaniards passage through his territory. After three attempts the Spaniards conquered Yucatán in 1547.

== Organization ==
The Kuchkabals were divided into municipalities called batalib (plural: batalibob). Each Batalib was ruled by a batab (plural: batabob). The ruler of a Kuchkabal was called a Halach Uinik, which means "person of fact, person of command". A Halach Uinik was a monarch, but some kuchkabals were oligarchies, with each batalib having a seat on a senate. As in the case of Ekab, one batalib usually had more powerful batabob. The batabob were normally related to the Halach Uinik.
