= Chel family =

Mayan ruling family

- Current region: Ah Kin Chel
- Etymology: From Yucatec Che'el Staff / rod of justice or Chel arch sky / rainbow
- Origin: Mayapan / Tecoh
- Members: Mo-Chel, Namox Chel, Namux Chel
- Connected families: Pech family, Cocom family, Xiu family, Canul family
- Distinctions: Rulers of Ah Kin Chel

The Chels, Cheles, or Che'els (From Yucatec Che'el Staff / rod of justice or Chel arch sky / rainbow )(in Maya glyphs) were the ruling family of the Maya Kuchkabal of Ah Kin Chel.

The Chels originally hailed from Mayapan, one of the three capitals of the League of Mayapan, where they were traditionally priests and nobles.

Mo-Chel was the first ruler of Ah Kin Chel. He was originally a nobleman, the son-in-law of one of the principal priests at Mayapan. Another priest Ah Xupan Nauat married his daughter Namox Chel to Mo.

Mo-Chel is said to have foreseen the destruction of the League of Mayapan in 1441 and he fled with some followers to Tecoh near Izamal, where he established an independent state which he named Ah Kin (high priest, literally is from the sun) Chel (from his last name; this was a naming tradition used by many Kuchkabals).

The Chel family remained in rule until the end of Ah Kin Chel. Namux Chel was the last ruler of Ah Kin Chel, and was in power in 1527 when Francisco de Montejo visited. To avoid conflict he allowed the Spaniards passage through his territory.
