= Tecoh International Poetry Festival =

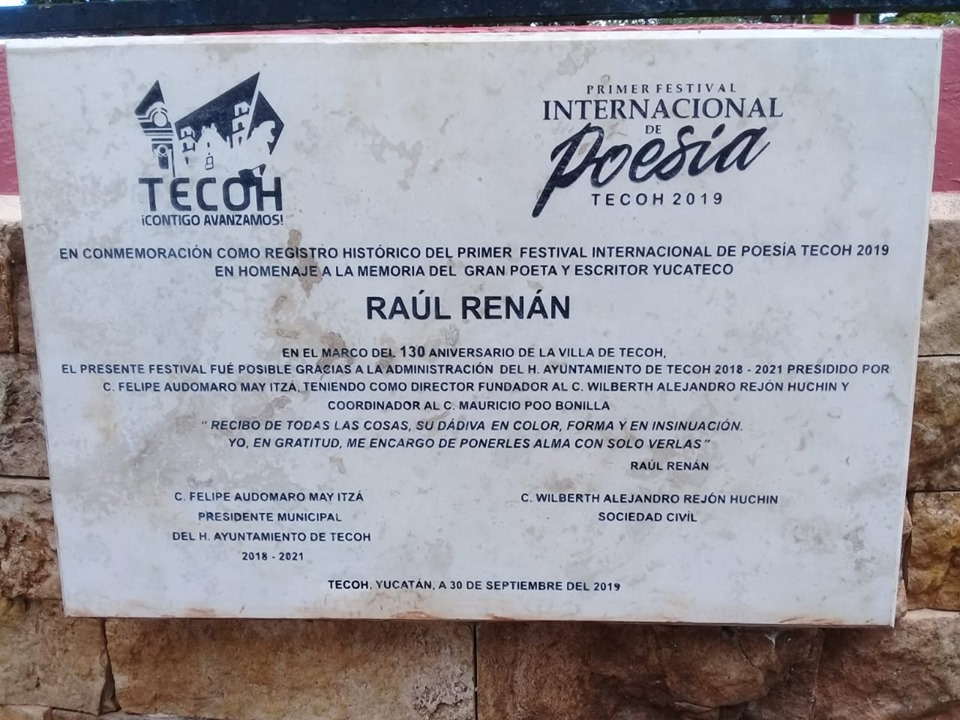
Plaque commemorating the festival placed in the park of the municipality of Tecoh, Mexico.

Tecoh International Poetry Festival is an event that consists of public poetry readings harmonized with cultural activities, by poets and artists from different countries, held in the municipality of Tecoh, Yucatán . The festival is supported by the H. Ayuntamiento de Tecoh.

== History ==
In order to increase the cultural program of the state of Yucatán and as a result of the 130th anniversary of the municipality of Tecoh, the poet and cultural promoter Alejandro Rejon Huchin proposed to inaugurate an international festival to help raise awareness among different audiences, contributing to social and cultural development of the community, the festival also had a contribution to cultural memory by paying tribute to the Mexican poet Raúl Renán through the unveiling of a plaque and the delivery of the international medal that bears his name. the reception of the first edition was positive before the media, due to the rapprochement of the community in general, especially children and young people.

== Participants of the first edition ==
Poets and artists from the United States, Cuba, Colombia, Guatemala, Argentina, and Mexico participated in the festival, including Mexican poets Marcos Rodríguez Leija and Víctor Toledo .

== Raúl Renán International Poetry Presea ==
The festival's international poetry prize was awarded to the following poets:

Rubén Reyez Ramírez: For his contribution from an anthropological, philosophical and humanistic perspective to Mexican literature, but especially to the Yucatecan.

Juan Arabia and Camila Evia: For the great work in the Buenos Aires Poetry editorial and magazine, whose international impact has supported the dissemination of the literature of the new generations.
