= Mo-Chel =

- Halach Uinik of Ah Kin Chel

Halach Uinik of Ah Kin Chel
- Reign: 1443-?
- Born: Mayapan, Chiefdom of Tutul-Xiu
- Died: Tecoh, Chiefdom of Ah Kin Chel
- Spouse: Namox Chel
- Issue: Namux Chel
- House: Chel (founder)
- Religion: Maya religion

Mo-Chel was the first Halach Uinik of the Kuchkabal Ah Kin Chel. He started the rule of the Chel family and the political state ruled by them. He was originally a nobleman, the son in law of one of the principal priests at Mayapan. Another priest Ah Xupan Nauat married his daughter Namox Chel to Mo. He is said to have foreseen the destruction of the League of Mayapan, and he fled with some followers to Tecoh near Izamal, where he established an independent state. He named the nation Ah Kin (high priest, literally means is from the sun) Chel (from his last name, a way of naming used by many Kuchkabal).

He may have founded his capital in Tecoh because of a pilgrimage he had once made to the coast in that area. He also believed that he could recruit followers there more easily.
