= Mayapan Building =

Skyscraper in Rio de Janeiro, Brazil

- Edifício Mayapan
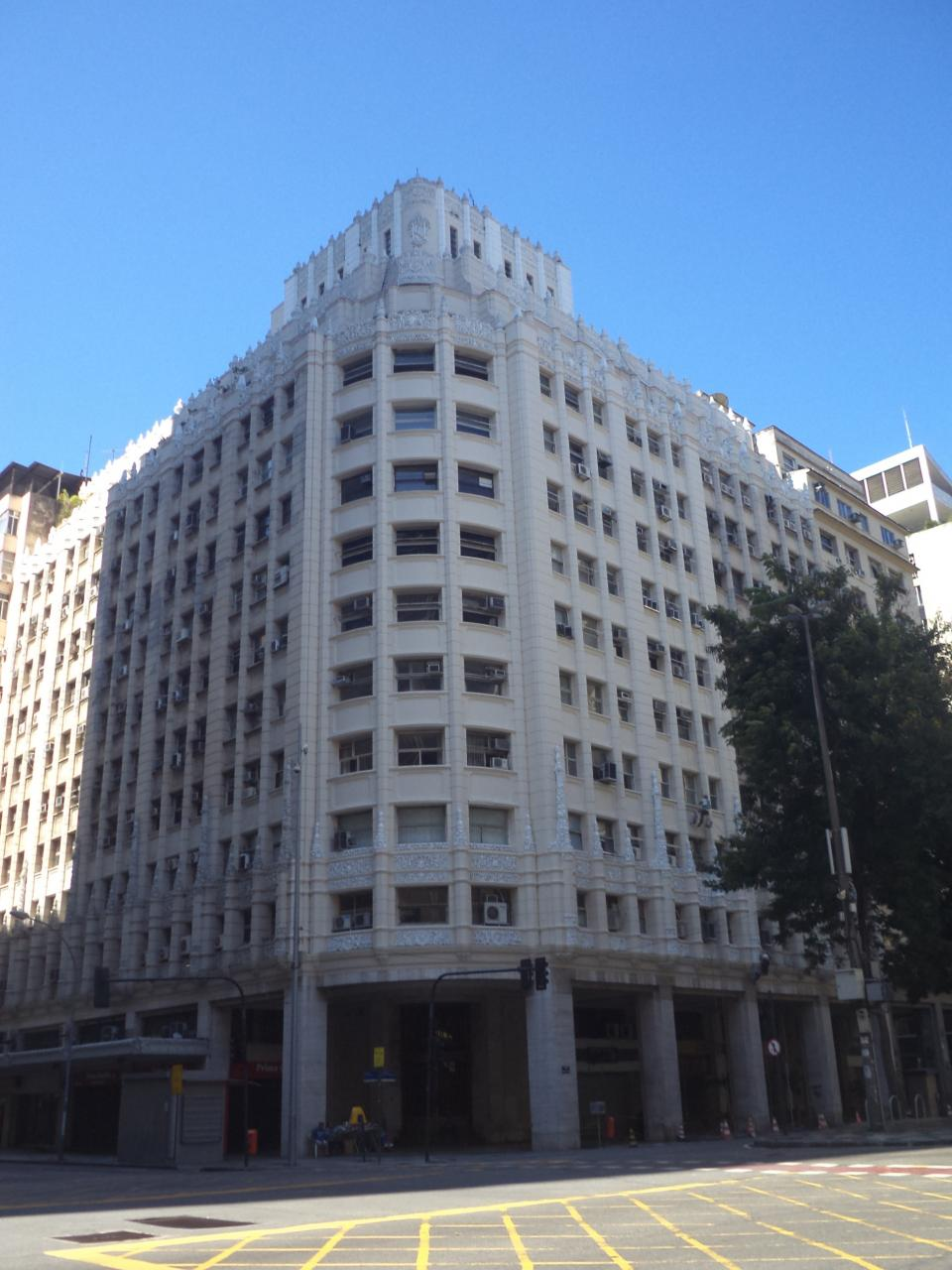
- Interactive map of the Mayapan Building area

General information
- Location: Rio de Janeiro, Brazil
- Coordinates: 22.90715°S 43.17477°W
- Opening: 1982

The Mayapan Building (Portuguese: Edifício Mayapan) is a building in Rio de Janeiro, Brazil.

== History ==
The building, designed by Mário Sodre and constructed by the firm Freire & Sodré, was completed in 1940. Its name pays tribute to the pre-Columbian archaeological site of Mayapan in Mexico. The property's original owner was the Companhia de Imóveis do Rio de Janeiro.

== Description ==
Located on a corner lot in downtown Rio de Janeiro, the building is designed in the Art Deco style. Its richly ornamented façades feature decorative motifs inspired by Spanish and Mexican art on the ground and uppermost floors, as well as a bas-relief bearing the initials of the building's original owner.
