= Hacienda Itzincab Cámara =

- Private Residence / Event Venue
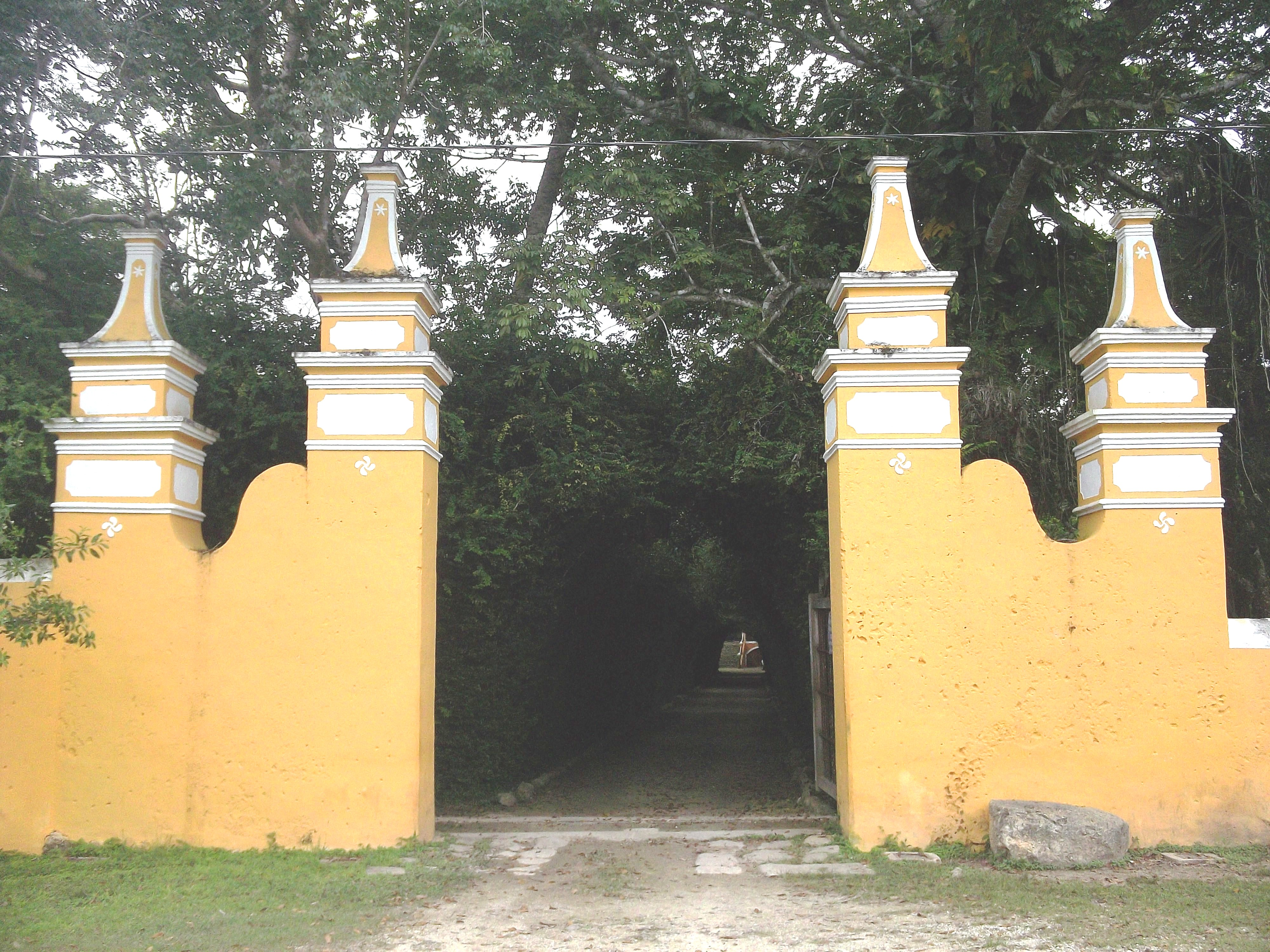
- Entrance Hacienda Itzincab Cámara, Yucatán.

- Location in Mexico
- Coordinates: 20°45′10″N 89°33′40″W
- Country: Mexico
- Mexican States: Yucatán
- Municipalities: Tecoh Municipality
- Time zone: UTC−6 (CST)
  - Summer (DST): UTC−5 (CDT)
- Postal code: 97822
- Area code: 988

Hacienda Itzincab Cámara is located in the Tecoh Municipality in the state of Yucatán in southeastern Mexico. It is one of the properties that arose during the nineteenth century henequen boom.

== Toponymy ==
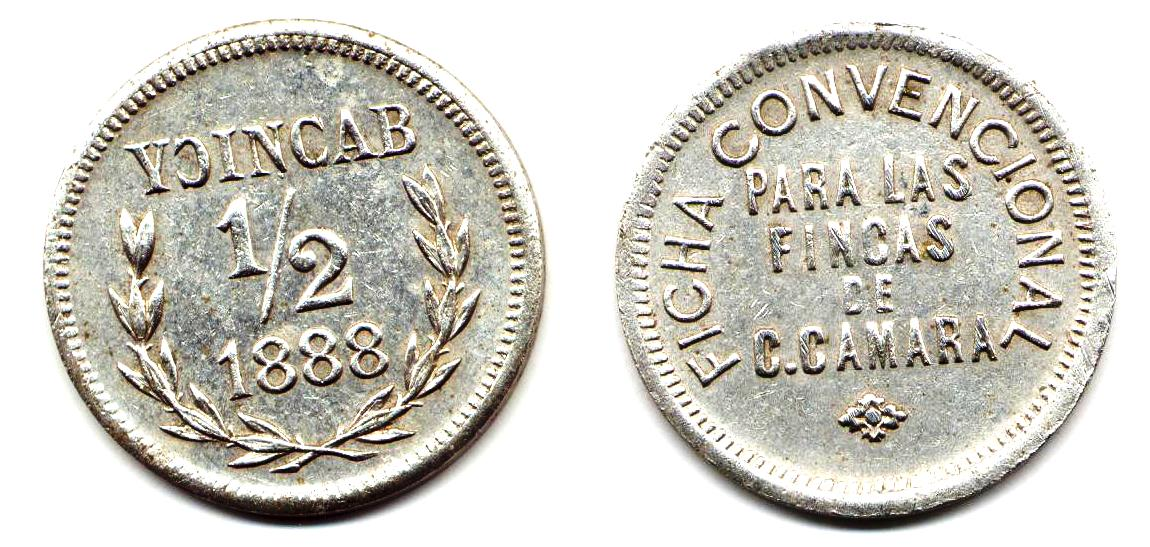
Hacienda Itzincab Cámara token

The name (Itzincab Cámara) is a combination of Maya and Spanish terms. Itzincab is a word from the Mayan language meaning brother of the earth and Cámara was the Spanish surname of one of the former owners, but the word "cámara" means chamber. Various spellings have been used in relation to the hacienda. On coins from 1888 the spelling was Yɔincab. In 1910 the name changed from Isincab to Idzincab; in 1960, it was Idzincab Cámara; in 1970, the name became Itzincab Cámara; in 1980, it was changed to Idzincab Cámara, in 1995 the name became Itzincab; and today the property is called Itzincab Cámara.

== How to get there ==
Take Calle 42 south from Mérida crossing the Periférico and continuing approximately 21 km. At a "y" on an unnamed road, turn left and proceed 2.5 km to the hacienda. An alternate route is to take highway 18 from Mérida to Tecoh. After reaching Tecoh, turn right on Calle 27 for approximately 8 km.

== History ==
The hacienda was purchased in around 1860 by Camilo G. Cámara. As early as 1898, Cuban workers were being used on the farm. In 1905, salary reports show 22 of the workers were from the newly arrived Korean indentured servants. In 1910, the owner Gonzalo Cámara Zavala, son of the previous owner, opened a rural school on the estate. It was one of the first schools in the area.

In the 1930s with the land reforms passed under the agrarian acts the size of the hacienda was greatly reduced. In 1934, the family retained 211 hectares. By 1981 only 14 hectares were still part of the hacienda and when the Cámara family sold the property in 1996, the property had 4 hectares of land remaining. It was sold in 1996 to a group of private investors. It is a private hacienda available to rent for weddings, events, and photography sessions.

== Architecture ==
On the southern boundary of the property is the oldest building on the hacienda, which has pilasters supporting transverse arches with rudimentary carvings. Nearby, an arch in the Yucatecan Moorish style with neoclassical adaptations, which faces south, appears to confirm the original entrance to the estate.

The architecture is reminiscent of the colonial style, with the front portico having three arches supported by pillars accessed by a large stone staircase flanked by iron rails. Many of the rooms have original stenciling on the walls, as can be seen in the master bedroom and oratory. In addition there is a pantry, kitchen, lobby, interior corridor with arches, a wine cellar and dining room.

On the southwest corner of the property is the small house which at one time was the company store. South of the main entrance are also the remains of what was a chapel, which has no roof. It still retains its chancel, altar, sacristy and steeple.

== Demographics ==
All of the henequen plantations ceased to exist as autonomous communities with the agrarian land reform implemented by President Lazaro Cardenas in 1937. His decree turned the haciendas into collective ejidos, leaving only 150 hectares to the former landowners for use as private property. Figures before 1937 indicate populations living on the farm. After 1937, figures indicate those living in the community, as the remaining Hacienda Itzincab Cámara houses only the owner's immediate family.

According to the 2005 census conducted by the INEGI, the population of the city was 377 inhabitants, of whom 190 were men and 187 were women.

Population of Itzincab Cámara by year
Year	1900	1910	1921	1930	1940	1950	1960	1970	1980	1990	1995	2000	2005
Population	301	367	166	199	202	210	259	281	129	255	292	335	377

== Bibliography ==
- Bracamonte, P and Solís, R., Los espacios de autonomía maya, Ed. UADY, Mérida, 1997.
- Gobierno del Estado de Yucatán, "Los municipios de Yucatán", 1988.
- Kurjack, Edward y Silvia Garza, Atlas arqueológico del Estado de Yucatán, Ed. INAH, 1980.
- Patch, Robert, La formación de las estancias y haciendas en Yucatán durante la colonia, Ed. UADY, 1976.
- Peón Ancona, J. F., "Las antiguas haciendas de Yucatán", en Diario de Yucatán, Mérida, 1971.

== Photo gallery ==
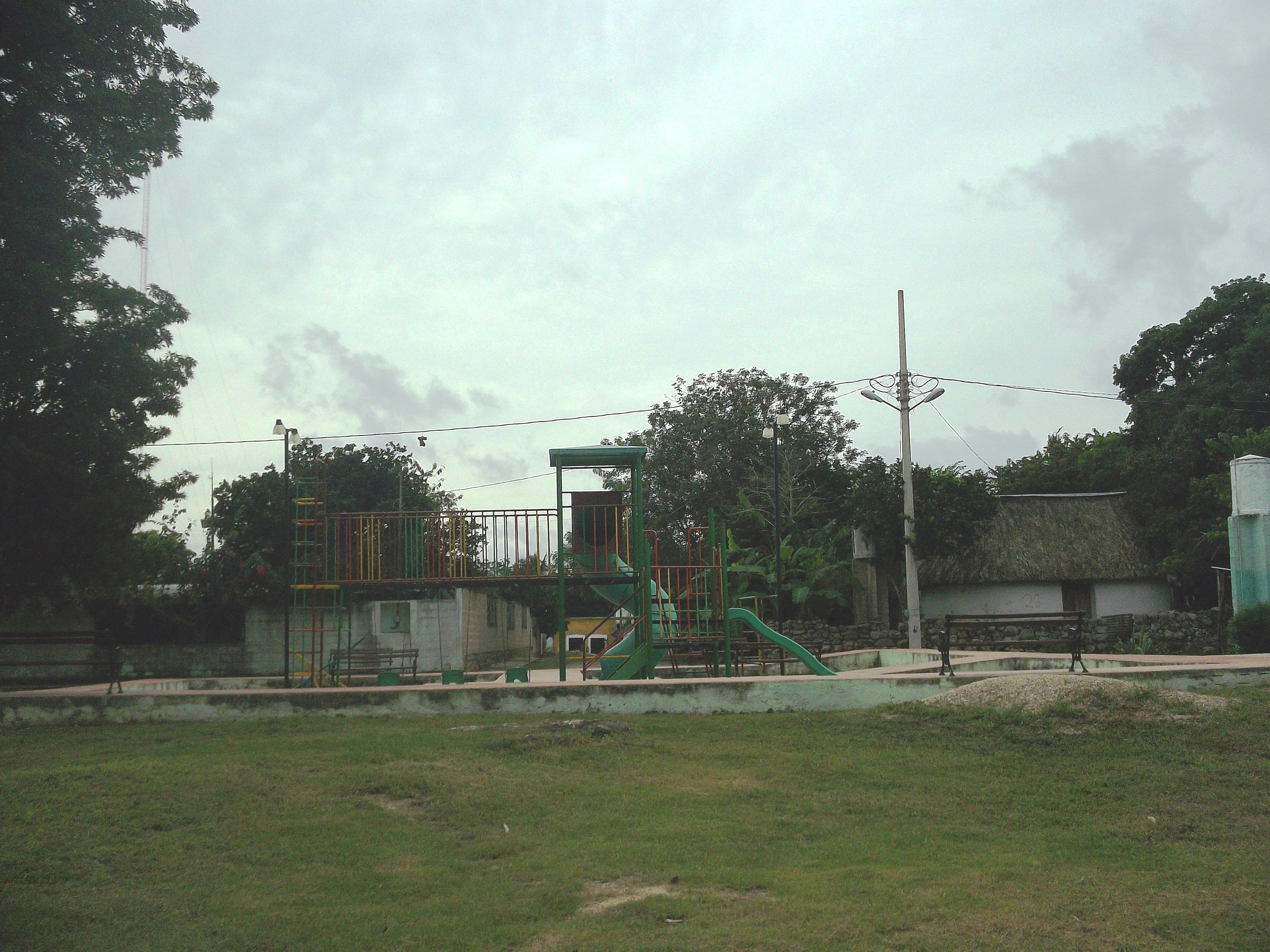
Hacienda Itzincab Cámara principal park

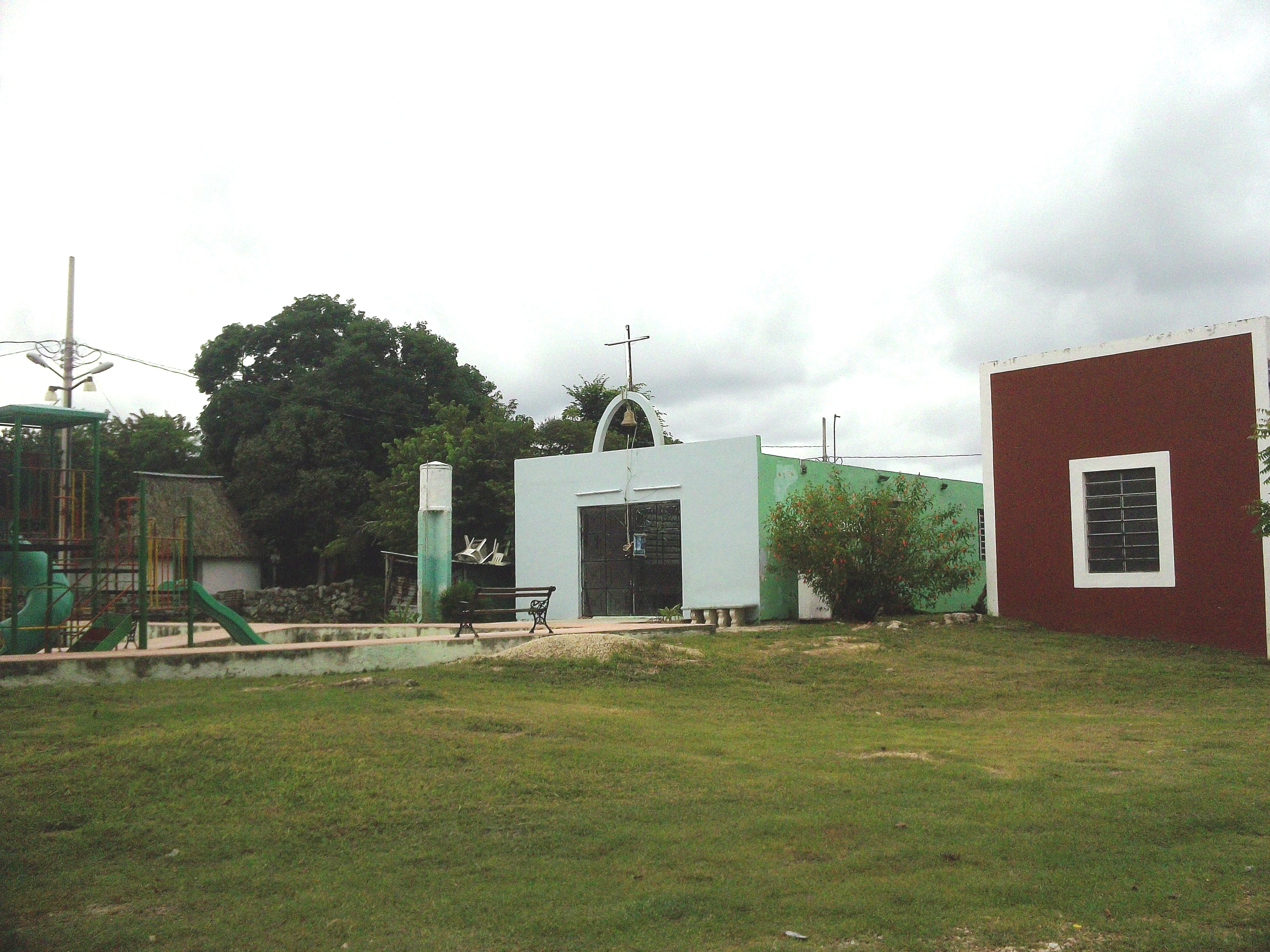
Church at Hacienda Itzincab Cámara

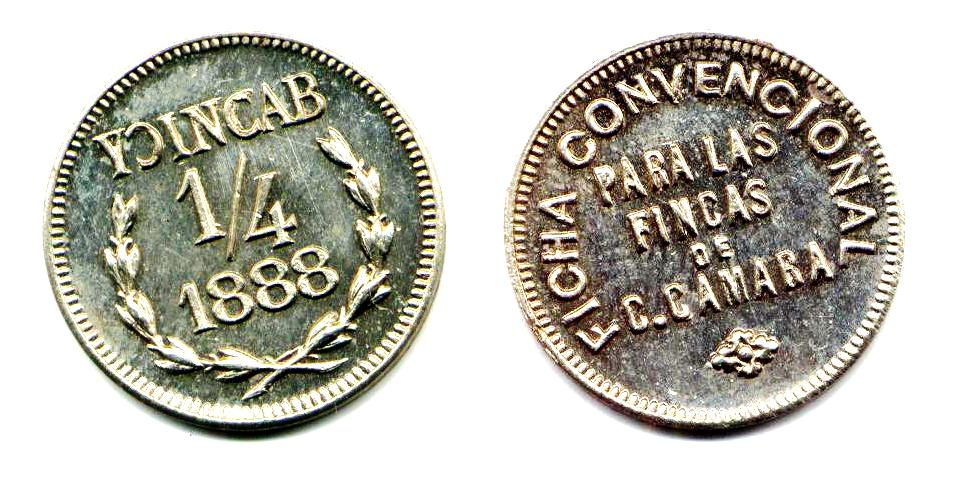
Hacienda Itzincab Cámara token
