= Alejandro Rejon Huchin =

Mexican poet (born 1997)

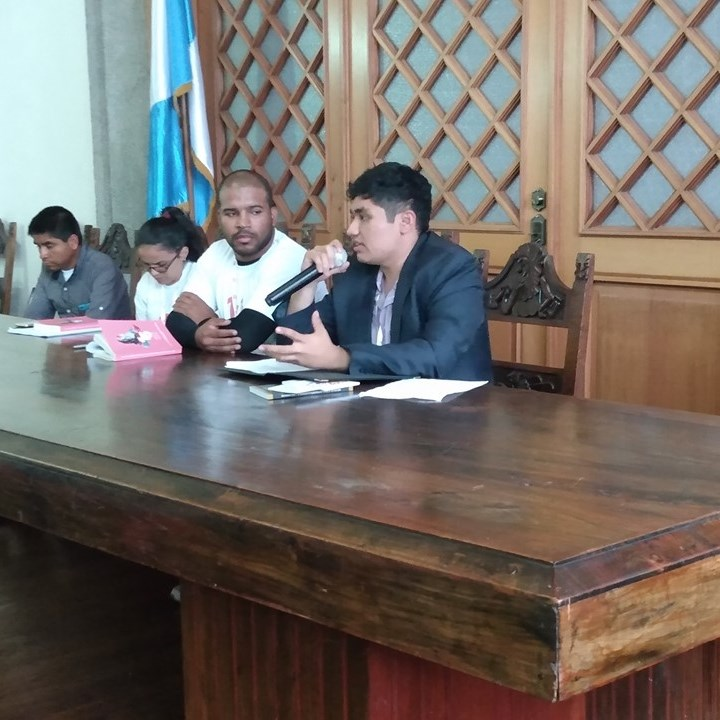
- Alejandro Rejon at the International Poetry Festival in Quetzaltenango, Guatemala
- Born: May 18, 1997 (age 29); Mérida, Yucatán, Mexico
- Occupations: Poet, author, cultural manager

Wilberth Alejandro Rejon Huchin (born May 18, 1997) is a Mexican poet and cultural manager. He was a fellow at the 2016 interface cultural festival in Mérida. Director of the Tecoh international poetry festival, Yucatán. Some of his texts have been translated into Arabic, Italian and Romanian.

== Biography ==
Rejon Huchin was born in Mérida, Yucatán on May 18, 1997. Director of the literary magazine Marcapiel, he was awarded a scholarship by the Interfaz de Mérida Cultural Festival in 2016. He has published in different national and international magazines and anthologies and participated in different literary events. In March 2019 directs the First International Meeting of Literature and Education at FILEY. In September of that same year he served as the creator and promoter of the International Poetry Festival in Tecoh, Yucatán, in which poets from Mexico, Argentina, the United States, Cuba, Colombia and Guatemala participated. Author of three books of poetry published in Chile, Argentina and United States. He is a columnist for the Mexican weekly La Revista Peninsular.

== Works ==
His poetic work has been published prolifically in magazines and anthologies in Colombia, Spain, Italy, Portugal, Argentina, Guatemala and Mexico.

=== Books published ===
- Course of a cut portrait , Argentina, editorial Buenos Aires Poetry , 2019.
- The broken water of dreams , USA, editorial Primigenios , 2020.
- Relámpago de sed , Chile, editorial Andesgraund , 2020.

=== Publications in magazines ===
- Poem "Bifurcation of matter" in Flight Bitácora , September 2015.
- Poem "Volatile Lake" in Endless , no. 14, November–December, Mexico, 2015.
- Poem "Entities that light up" , in Sinfín , no. 19, September–October, Mexico, 2016.
- Anthology "Wilberth Alejandro Rejón Huchin" , in TriploV de Artes, Religiones y Ciencias , no. 60, September–October, Portugal, 2016.
- Anthology "Fog of sun" in Rick , no. 87, July–August, Spain, 2016.
- Anthology "Current Mexican Poetry: Alejandro Rejón" in Círculo de Poesía , September 6, 2016, Mexico.
- Anthology "Poema de Wilberth Alejandro Rejón Huchin" in Revista Literaria Monolito , November 21, 2016.
- Anthology "Alejandro Rejon Huchin" in La Raíz Invertida: Latin American Poetry Magazine , January 20, 2017, Colombia.
- Anthology "Caltrops and rhymes: Alejandro Rejón Huchin" in La Máscarada , January 23, 2017, Mexico City, Mexico.
- Anthology "Poems of Alejandro Rejón" in Ómnibus , no. 54, March 2017, Spain.
- Anthology "Alejandro Rejón Huchín.Poesías" in Soma: Arte y cultura. , September 28, 2017, Mexico.
- Anthology "Poems of Alejandro Rejón Huchín" in Letralia , August 9, 2017, Venezuela.
- Anthology "Three poems" in Levadura Magazine , October 20, 2017, Mexico.
- Anthology "Alejandro Rejón Huchin – Due Inediti (Traduzione di Antonio Nazzaro)" in Alterier , April 20, 2018, Italy.
- Anthology "Rainy afternoon in Toluca de Lerdo" in Buenos Aires Poetry , July 13, 2019, Argentina.

==== Participation in anthologies ====
- "First poetic anthology: Nomadic Poetry" , nomadic editions, Argentina 2016.
- "Poetas Allende de los mares" , Spain, 2018.
- "Poets in the cosmovitral" , Town hall of Toluca, Mexico 2018.
- "Memory of 15 Quetzaltenango International Poetry Festival" , Metáfora editions, Guatemala, 2019.
- "Fragua de preces" , Abra cultural, Spain, 2020.

== Participations ==
- XVI International Congress of Poetry and Poetics (BUAP) Puebla, Mexico 2016.
- First International Poetry Festival José María Heredia, Toluca, Mexico, 2017.
- XXII International Poetry Festival of Havana, Cuba, 2018.
- International Festival of contemporary poetry, San Cristóbal de Las Casas, Chiapas, 2018.
- Second International Poetry Festival José María Heredia 2018, Toluca.
- XV International Poetry Festival of Quetzaltenango, Guatemala, 2019.

== Distinctions ==
- Distinguished visitor from the city of Toluca, Mexico, 2018.
- Harold Von Ior International Poetry Prize, 2019.
- International recognition of cultural merit, Town hall of Tecoh, Mexico, 2020.
- Recognition for its work in the creation of international projects for the benefit of the artistic, literary and cultural community, the Institute of Education and Training of Public Security of Tlaxcala, 2020.
