= Tecoh Municipality =

Municipality in the Mexican state of Yucatán

Tecoh
- Municipality
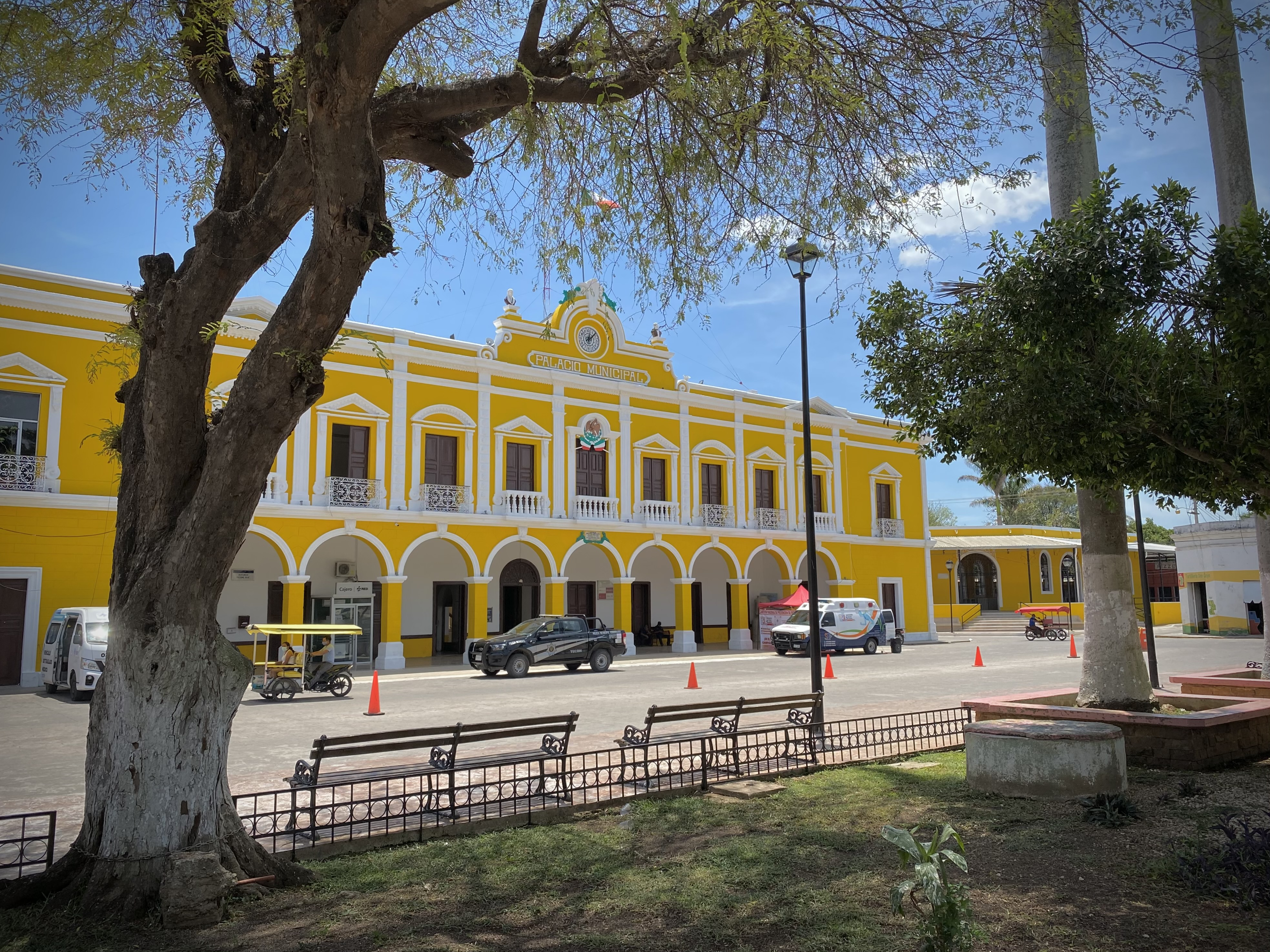
- Main square, town of Tecoh, 2021

- Region 2 Noroeste #076

- Location of the Municipality in Mexico
- Coordinates: 20°44′N 89°28′W
- Country: Mexico
- State: Yucatán

Government
  - Municipal President: Victor Armando Pacheco May

Area
  - Total: 452.2 km^{2} (174.6 sq mi)
- Elevation: 16 m (52 ft)

Population (2005)
  - Total: 15,438
  - Density: 34.14/km^{2} (88.42/sq mi)
- Time zone: UTC-6 (Central Standard Time)
- Postal Code: 97820
- Area code: 988
- INEGI Code: 076
- Major Airport: Merida (Manuel Crescencio Rejón) International Airport
- IATA Code: MID
- ICAO Code: MMMD

Tecoh Municipality is a municipality in the Mexican state of Yucatán. It is located 40 km south-east of Mérida, Yucatán. It has a municipal capital of the same name. As of 2003, the city Tecoh had a population of about 8,500 people. Most of the population is Maya. A number of buildings in the town were built atop older Pre-Columbian foundations. "Tecoh" means "Place of the Puma" in the Yucatec Maya language, which is still widely spoken here.

Most of the farms in Tecoh are used to grow henequen, sugar, corn, and tropical fruit.

== Communities ==
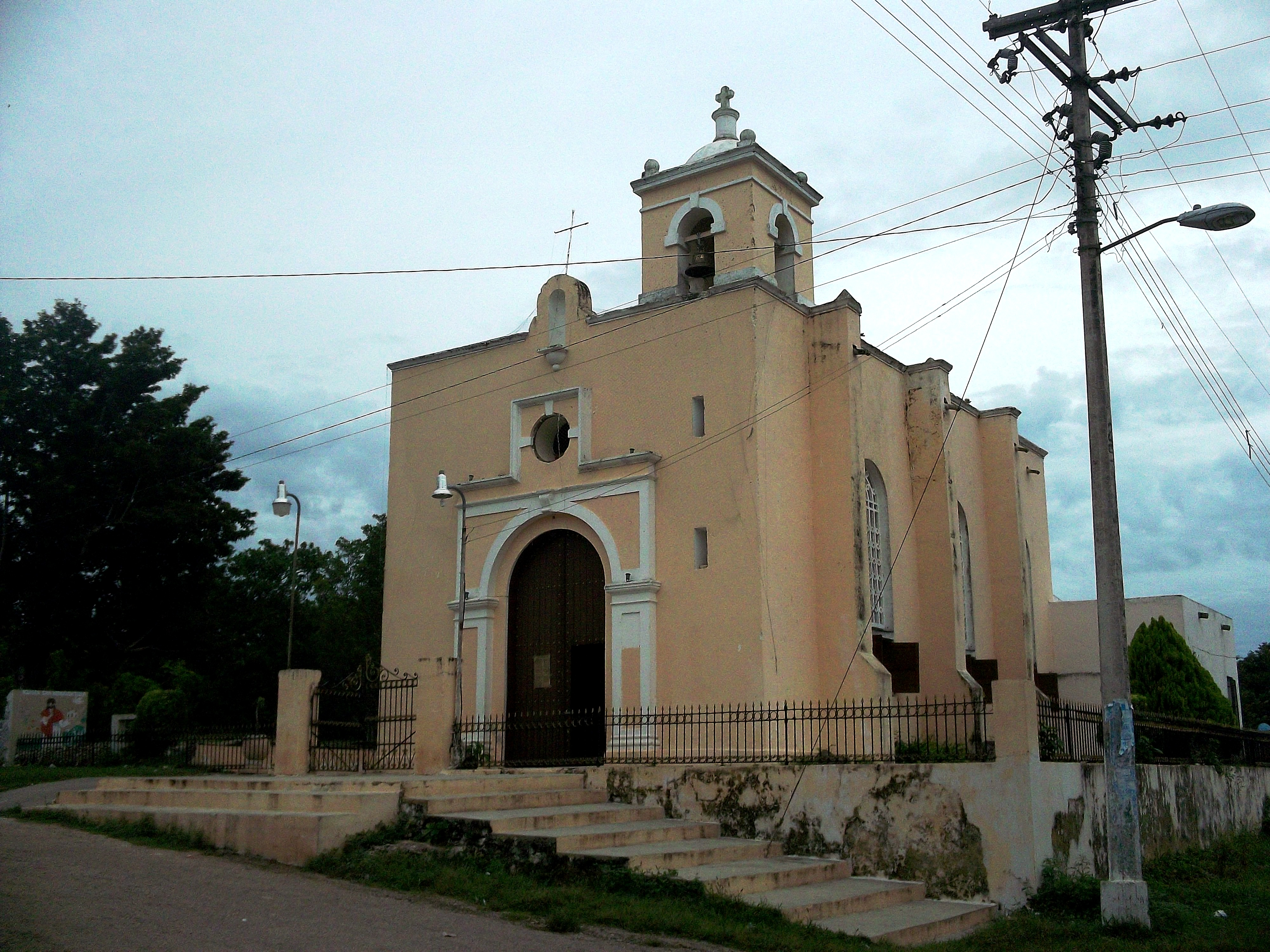
Church in Lepán

The municipality is made up of 20 communities, of which the most important are:

- Tecoh (Municipal Seat)
- Xcanchakan
- Telchaquillo
- Lepan
- Pixya

== Landmarks ==
- Cenote Nayah

=== Architectural ===
- A church erected in honor of the Virgin de la Candelaria, a chapel in honor of the Santa Cruz and a church dedicated to the Virgin de la Asunción; all built since colonial times.
- Hacienda Itzincab Cámara
- Hacienda Oxtapacab
- Hacienda Sotuta de Peón (features a 500 mm (19 3/4 in) narrow gauge horse-drawn tram providing tours around the property)
- Hacienda Xcanchakán

=== Archaeological ===
The archaeological site of Mayapan.

== Notable people ==
- Manuel Lorenzo Justiniano de Zavala y Sanchez (Known in Texas as Lorenzo de Zavala)
