= Kʼakʼupakal =

Kʼakʼupakal, or possibly Kʼakʼupakal Kʼawiil (fl. c. 869–890) was a ruler or high-ranking officeholder at the pre-Columbian Maya site of Chichen Itza, during the latter half of the 9th century CE. The name of this ruler, alternatively written Kʼahkʼupakal, Kʼakʼ Upakal or Kʼakʼ-u-pakal, is the most widely mentioned personal name in the surviving Maya inscriptions at Chichen Itza, and also appears on monumental inscriptions at other Yucatán Peninsula sites such as Uxmal.
