= Mayapan =

Pre-Columbian Maya site in Mexico

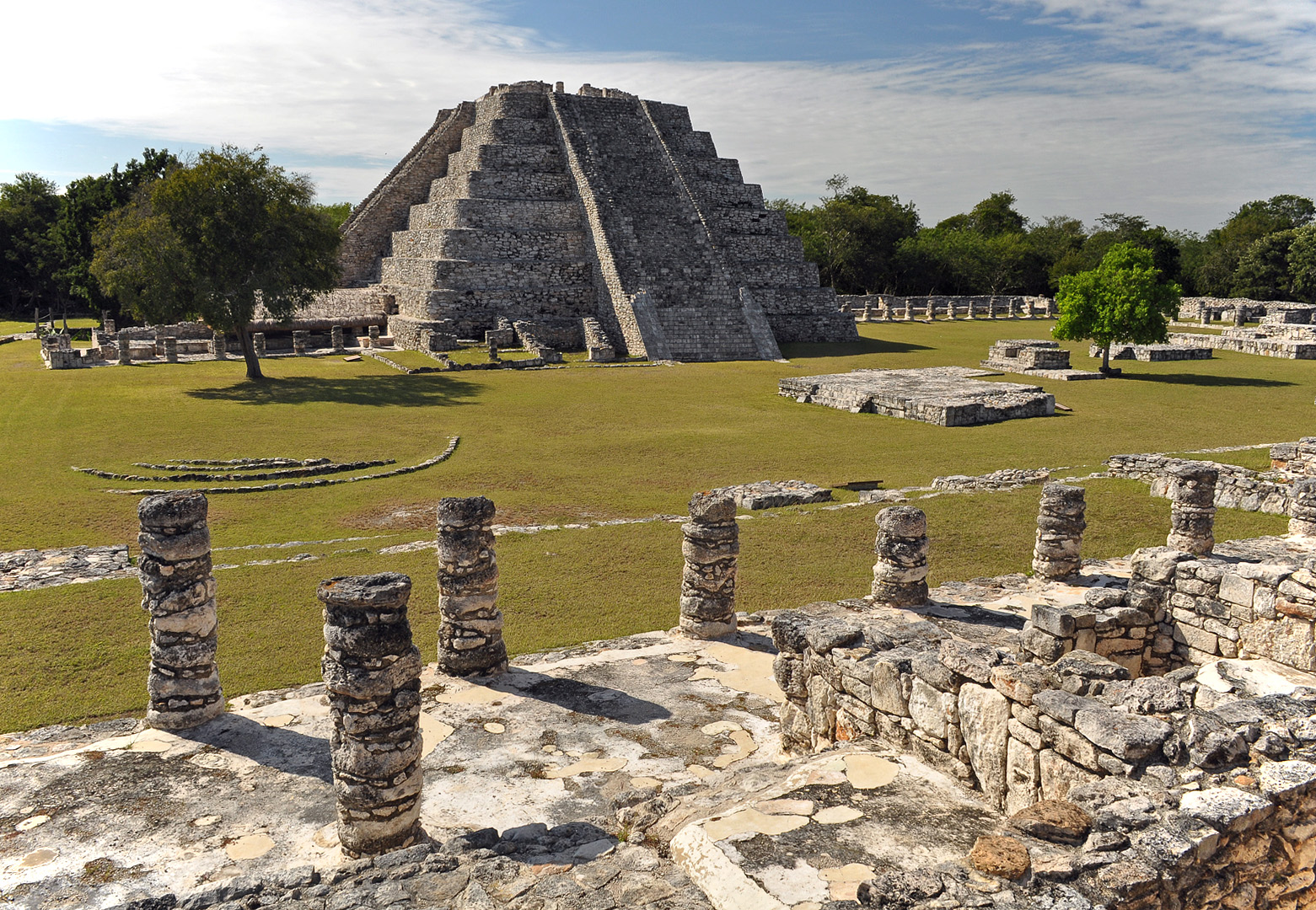
- Temple of Kukulkan at Mayapan

- Location of the site Mayapan (Yucatán (state))
- 20°37′46″N 89°27′38″W
- Periods: Middle Preclassic to Late Postclassic
- Cultures: Maya civilization
- Location: Tecoh Municipality, Yucatán, Mexico
- Region: Yucatán Peninsula

History
- Built: c. 1020 CE
- Abandoned: 15th century

Mayapan (Màyapáan in Modern Maya; in Spanish Mayapán) is a Pre-Columbian Maya site a couple of kilometers south of the town of Telchaquillo in Tecoh Municipality, approximately 40 km south-east of Mérida and 100 km west of Chichen Itza; in the state of Yucatán, Mexico. Mayapan was the political and cultural capital of the Maya in the Yucatán Peninsula during the Late Post-Classic period from the 1220s until the 1440s. Estimates of the total city population are 15,000–17,000 people, and the site has more than 4,000 structures within the city walls, and additional dwellings outside.

The site has been professionally surveyed and excavated by archeological teams, beginning in 1939; five years of work was done by a team in the 1950s, and additional studies were done in the 1990s. Since 2000, a collaborative Mexican-United States team has been conducting excavations and recovery at the site, which continue.

== Layout ==
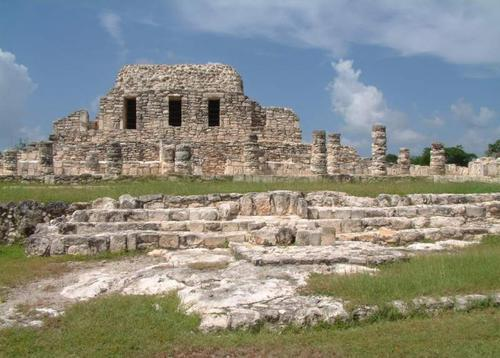
Maya Ruins in Mayapan.

Mayapan is 4.2 square kilometers (about 1.6 square miles) and has over 4000 structures, most of them residences, packed into this compound within the city walls. Built-up areas extend a half kilometer beyond the city walls in all directions. The stone perimeter wall has twelve gates, including seven major gates with vaulted entrances. The wall is 9.1 km (about 5.65 miles) long and is roughly ovate with a pointed northeast corner.

The ceremonial center of the site is located in Square Q of the city's grid in the center of the wider western half of the walled enclosure. The ceremonial center has a tightly packed cluster of temples, colonnaded halls, oratories, shrines, sanctuaries, altars, and platforms (for oration, dancing, or stela display). A.L. Smith, an archeologist with the Carnegie Institute, estimated 10–12,000 people lived within the walled city.

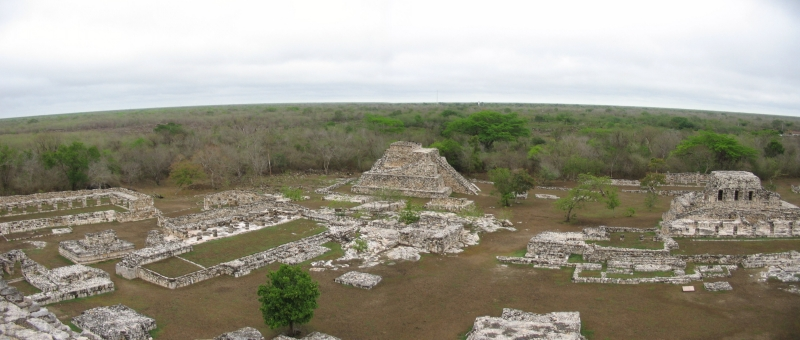
Mayan site, Mayapan. The picture was taken on the highest pyramid of the site.

According to Dr. Gregory Simons survey outside the city walls, there were numerous additional dwellings and he revised the total population estimate to between 15,000–17,000 people. His survey results are posted online at www.mayapanperiphery.net. People living outside of the city wall engaged in agriculture, animal-raising, and specialized activities such as lime production. Russell also found a colonnaded hall outside the city wall, revealing much is still to be discovered regarding the complexity of this urban landscape.

The Temple of Kukulcan, a large pyramid also known as the Castillo, is the main temple in Mayapan. It is located immediately to the east of the Cenote Ch'en Mul, which has caves radiating from it. In form, the Temple of Kukulcan (Structure Q-162 on the site map) is a radial four-staircase temple with nine terraces; it is generally similar to the Temple of Kukulcan at the earlier site of Chichen Itza. However, the Mayapan temple appears to be an inferior imitation of the one at Chichen Itza, and the city's buildings in general are not constructed as well as those in other Mayan cities. For example, most or all of the vaulted roofs in Mayapan have collapsed, while many of the better-built buildings at Chichen Itza remain intact. Other major temples in the ceremonial center include three round ones, which are unusual for the Maya area and are also linked to the deity Kukulkan/Quetzalcoatl in his wind god (Ehecatl) aspect. Unlike Chichen Itza, Mayapan has no ballcourts.

The extensive residential zones of the site are composed of dwellings and ancillary domestic structures, with those around the ceremonial district larger and of higher quality and those toward the fringes being generally poorer. The houses are often arranged in small patio groups surrounding small courtyards. Houses were built haphazardly without organized streets. Lanes wind among the residences and walls. The residential areas of the site contain many cenotes, perhaps as many as 40. Settlement was the most dense in the southwestern part of the city where cenotes are more numerous.

== Historical overview ==
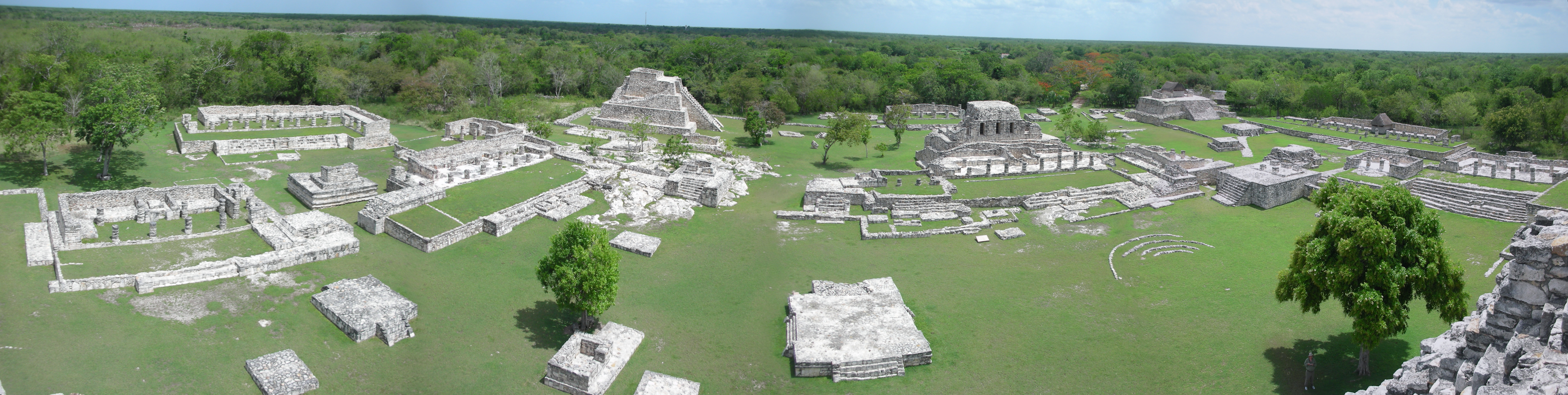
A panorama of the Mayapan excavations from the top of the Castle of King Kukulcan.

The ethnohistorical sources – such as Diego de Landa's Relacion de las Cosas de Yucatan, compiled from native sources in the 16th century – recount that the site was founded by Kukulcan (the Mayan name of Quetzalcoatl, the Toltec king, culture hero, and demigod) after the fall of Chichen Itza. He convened the lords of the region, who agreed to found a new capital at Mayapan. The lords divided the towns of Yucatán among them, and chose the chief of the Cocom family as their leader.

The ethnohistorical sources recount multiple different histories of the rise and fall of Mayapan (Roys 1962). These histories are often confusing, chronologically implausible, and difficult to reconcile. For example, some sources say that the Maya revolted in 1221 against the Maya-Toltec lords of Chichen Itza. After a short civil war, the lords of various powerful cities and families met to restore a central government to Yucatán. They decided to build a new capital city near the town of Telchaquillo, hometown of Hunac Ceel, the general who defeated the rulers of Chichen Itza. The new city was built within a defensive wall and named Mayapan, meaning "Standard of the Maya people".

The chief of the Cocom family, a rich and ancient lineage that had taken part in the revolt against Chichen, was chosen to be king, and all the other noble families and regional lords were to send members of their families to Mayapan to play parts in the government (and perhaps act as hostages for the good behavior of the subsidiary cities). Mexican mercenaries from Tabasco were also employed to keep order and maintain power. Another family, the Xiu, may have been living in the Mayapan area prior to the arrival of the Cocom; the Xiu claim to be a part of the lineage from Uxmal. This arrangement lasted for over 200 years. (An alternative account is given in a Maya chronicle from the Colonial era, claiming that Mayapan was contemporary with Chichen Itza and Uxmal and allied with those cities, but archeological evidence shows this version to be less likely.)

Mayapan became the primary city in a group of allies that included much of the northern Yucatán, and trade partners that extended directly to Honduras, Belize, and the Caribbean island of Cozumel, and indirectly to Mexico. Though Mayapan was ruled by a council, the Jalach winik and the aj k’in (the highest ruler, and the high priest) dominated the political sphere. Below the two primary officials were many other officials with varying responsibilities. The range of classes went from the nobility, down to slaves, with intermediary classes in between. The social climate of Mayapan was made complicated by the antagonistic relationship between the factions of nobles, which were often arranged by kinship (Pugh 2009; Milbrath 2003). In 1441, Ah Xiu Xupan of the powerful noble family of Xiu became resentful of the political machinations of the Cocom rulers and organized a revolt. As a result, all of the Cocom family, except one who was away in Honduras conducting trade, were killed, Mayapan was sacked, burned, and abandoned, all the larger cities went into decline, and Yucatán devolved into warring city-states.

Archaeological evidence indicates that at least the ceremonial center was burned at the end of the occupation. Excavation has revealed burnt roof beams in several of the major buildings in the site center.

== Excavations and investigations ==
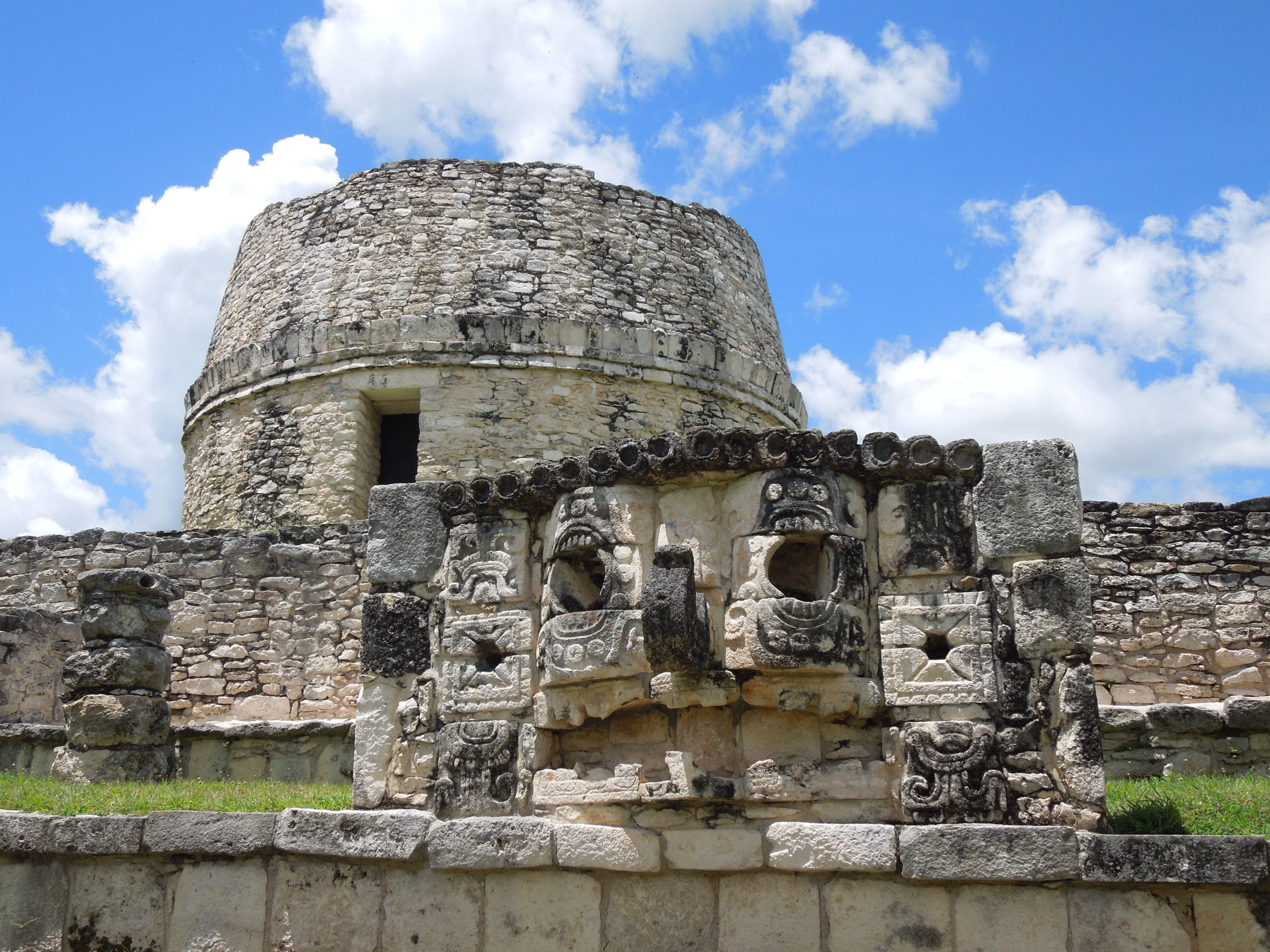
The Templo Redondo with a Mayan carving in the foreground.

In 1841 John L. Stephens was the first to document parts of the Mayapan site with two important illustrations. The first was of the Q-152 round temple, and the second was of the Pyramid of Kukulkan. He was the first in a long string of explorers who drew the ruins of Mayapan. The first large-scale archeological site surveys were not conducted until 1938 by R.T. Patton. These surveys mapped the main plaza group and the city wall, and were the basis of later maps (Russell 2008).

In the 1950s, archaeologists of the Carnegie Institution, including A. L. Smith, Robert Smith, Tatiana Proskouriakoff, Edwin Shook, Karl Ruppert and J. Eric Thompson conducted five years of intensive archeological investigations at Mayapan. Their work was published in a mimeographed series of Current Reports. The Current Reports have recently been republished in their entirety by the University of Colorado Press (John Weeks 2009). The final report was published by the Carnegie Institution as Mayapan, Yucatan, Mexico, by H. E. D. Pollock, Ralph L. Roys, A. L. Smith, and Tatiana Proskouriakoff (1962, Publication 619). Robert Smith published a two-volume monograph on The Pottery of Mayapan in 1971 (Papers of the Peabody Museum of Archaeology and Ethnology 66, Harvard University).

In the early 1990s, Clifford T. Brown of Tulane University carried out excavations in the residential zones of Mayapan as part of his doctoral dissertation research. Several years later, the National Institute of Anthropology and History (INAH) of Mexico began extensive architectural excavations and consolidation under the direction of archaeologist Carlos Peraza Lope. This work continues to the present. It has resulted in the discovery of many important artifacts, murals, stuccoes, and architectural elements.

From 2001 to 2009, further investigations were begun at the site by a team under the direction of Dr. Marilyn Masson from the State University New York at Albany, Carlos Peraza Lope of INAH, and Timothy S. Hare of Morehead State University. This "Economic Foundations of Mayapan" (PEMY) Project performed mapping, surface survey and collection, test-pitting, and horizontal excavation across the city. Major findings of this project include the identification of diverse occupational specialization among the city's commoners, who worked as craftsmen, conscripted military personnel, farmers, and domestic servants. Great variation is now recognized in the types of work performed by commoners of different households and their degrees of affluence. This project has also identified a probable major market plaza in Square K (between the site center and major north gate D); Richard Terry, Bruce Dahlin, and Daniel Bair have analyzed soil samples from this location to test the function of this locality. In 2008 and 2009, the PEMY project focused excavations on an outlying ceremonial group by the far eastern city gate (Gate H), known as Itzmal Ch'en, as part of its study of the economic and social links between governing elites and distant neighborhoods within the city.

== Chronology ==
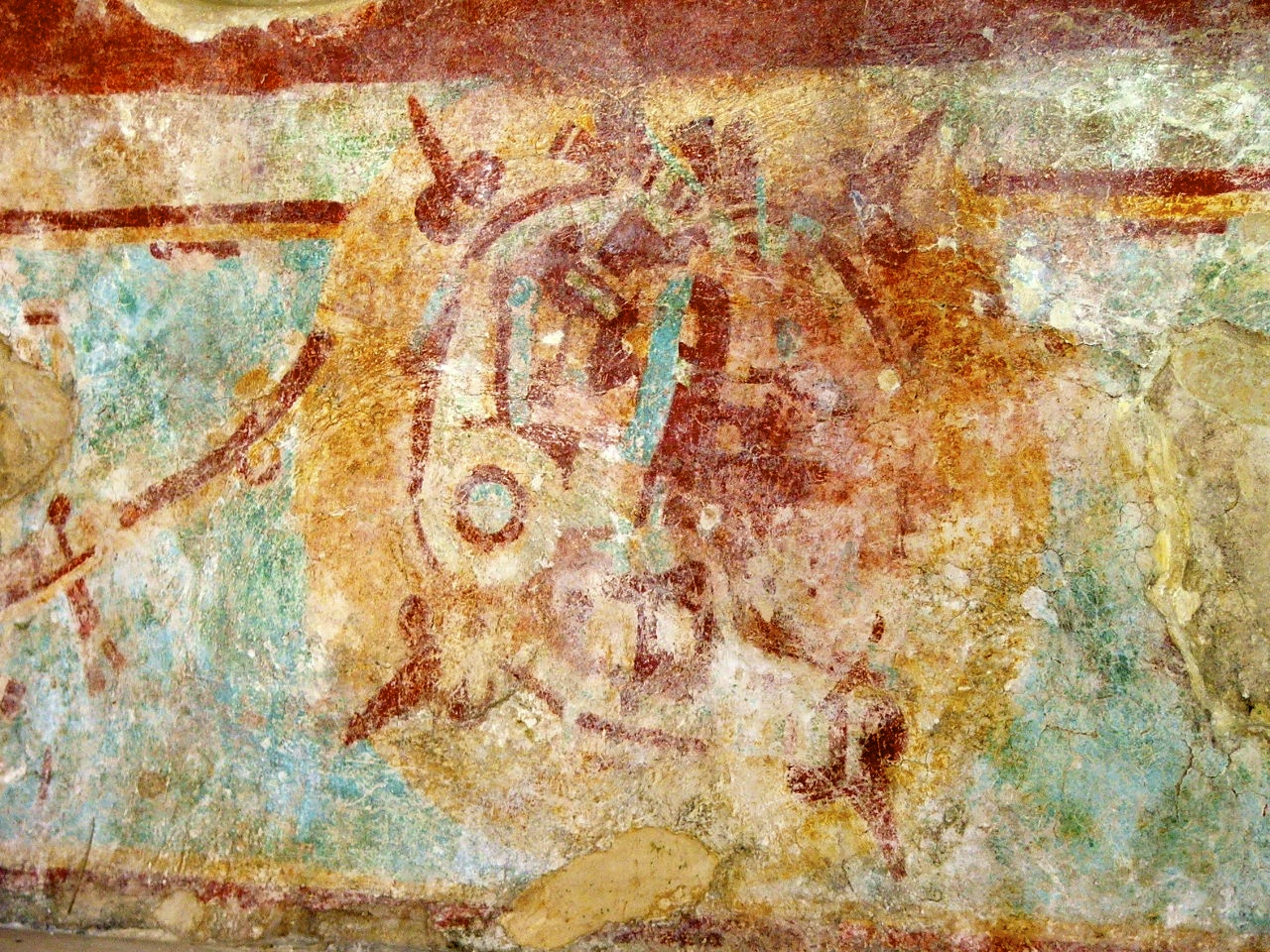
This mural partially survives in the Sala de los Frescos in Mayapán. In it appears a solar disk with the figure of a deity, possibly representing one of the transit of Venus that happened in years 1152 or 1275.

=== Before Mayapan ===
- Some evidence suggests overlapping occupation of the area by different cultures. Shook in 1954 said that there may have been a Puuc "city" somewhere near Mayapan prior to its post-classical settlement. The mixture of Puuc pot shards in the lower parts of Mayapan lots may support this, but it is a very small percentage of the material (2% in most cases and no more than 4% in others).

=== Site chronology based on ceramics ===
- According to Robert Smith, the ceramicist for the Carnegie Institution, there were two ceramic phases in Mayapan: hocaba, which he said started around A.D. 1200 and may have included types named Mama Red and Navula Unslipped, more commonly associated with southern lowland settlements. (Milbrath and Pereza argue that the Hocaba phase starts in A.D. 1100, which fits better with the chronology of the southern lowland sites.) The second phase is Tases, which has some overlapping typology with the Hocaba phase.

=== Site chronology based on radiocarbon dates ===
==== Middle Preclassical Date ====
In an alley fill between the Templo Redondo and an adjoining hall, some charcoal was found that yielded a calibrated date of 540–820 B.C. But, most of the pottery in this fill was post-classical. Researchers think that this sample represented old charcoal that predated the context in which it was found.

==== Terminal Classical Dates ====
A burial found on bedrock in the houselot soils of a post-classical solare dated between A.D. 600 and A.D. 780. The burial appeared to be a secondary interment, and could not be completely excavated because it intruded into a wall. There was no pottery with the burial; midden samples in this area suggest occupation prior to the construction of the post-classical houselots.

Charcoal was found on the upper floor of one of the temples that was dated to A.D. 770-1020. Researchers think that this sample is not associated with the context in which it was found. The construction fill as well as the upper floors were of post-classical age.

=== Early Mayapan occupation ===
- Three separate samples form the frame for early Mayapan occupation. These dates are A.D. 990–1170. However, two of these dates come from inexact sources. One was burned copal found in an unknown structure (apparently the label had eroded off of the structure); the researchers inferred that it was Q-95. The early date would suggest that this temple was built and in use in Mayapan's early history.
- Carbon dating of the pits below what was assumed to be Q-97 (again the label had eroded) dated from A.D. 990–1180.
- Charcoal found in the early construction phase of the site's main pyramid was dated A.D. 1020–1170. This sample was found in reliable context and is presumably the most accurate. It is important for suggesting that the post-classical phase in Mayapan started earlier than A.D. 1200.

=== Late Mayapan occupation ===
- Mayapan's settlement pattern radiated outwards to its fringes over time; many of the later dates are from materials outside of the main group of ruins. The fall of the city is tentatively dated around A.D. 1461, based on the lack of construction of altars and burial cists after this date. (Lope et al. 2006). According to Diego de Landa Calderon (1524–1579), the city was abandoned following the country's enslavement by a certain chieftain of the Yucatecan nation (in collusion with a garrison of Mexica Indians), and which abuse eventually led to internecine war, culminating in the city's demise in circa 1441.

== Agriculture and animals ==
Milpa, or mixed, fields may have been cultivated when Mayapan was inhabited. There is evidence that the area around Mayapan was regularly used for slash-and-burn agriculture. Cenotes and underground limestone canals serve as the only source of freshwater in this area, making them essential to support agriculture. Researchers have suggested that Mayapan was an import/export center, and that they often traded luxury goods, such as cotton, salt, and honey, for products of obsidian and metal, which they would have forged. (Paris 2008) (Melbrath & Peraza 2003:29). Today farmers use mixed fields, called the milpa fields, to cultivate maize, beans, squash, watermelons, mangoes, papayas and other crops. Also, citrus fruit such as oranges and limes are often grown within the domestic house groups of the local residents (Russell 2008:16).

Faunal remains indicate that the local population used varying methods of animal acquisition. A study done by M.A. Masson and C. Peraza Lope in 2008 looked at faunal remains from two different middens, one located in the monumental center by some houses, and the other is located in the domestic area outside the monumental compound. The largest samples of recognized remains within the monumental center were from: white-tailed deer (23%), dog (4.4%), turkey (12.9%), and iguana (10.2%). The combined contributions of fish make up around 1.2% of the samples. These percentages as well as the ones that will follow for the settlement zone are based on recognized remains. Primary animals may have made up larger portions of the diet but their remains are too difficult to recognize.

In the settlement zone, researchers found: white-tailed deer (8.4%), dog (1.4%), turkey (5.3%), iguana (14.5%), and fish (3.6%). Both turtle and rabbit remains were found in both sites, but they were consumed in small amounts (less than 1.5%). While excavating, the researchers noted many fish skeletons, but few fish heads. They concluded that the fish were being traded into Mayapan, and not collected near the site. If the fish had been prepared at the site, the heads would have been common refuse. Within the ceremonial center, numerous deer heads and teeth were found among the remains.(M.A. Masson, C. Peraza Lope 2008).

== Trade ==
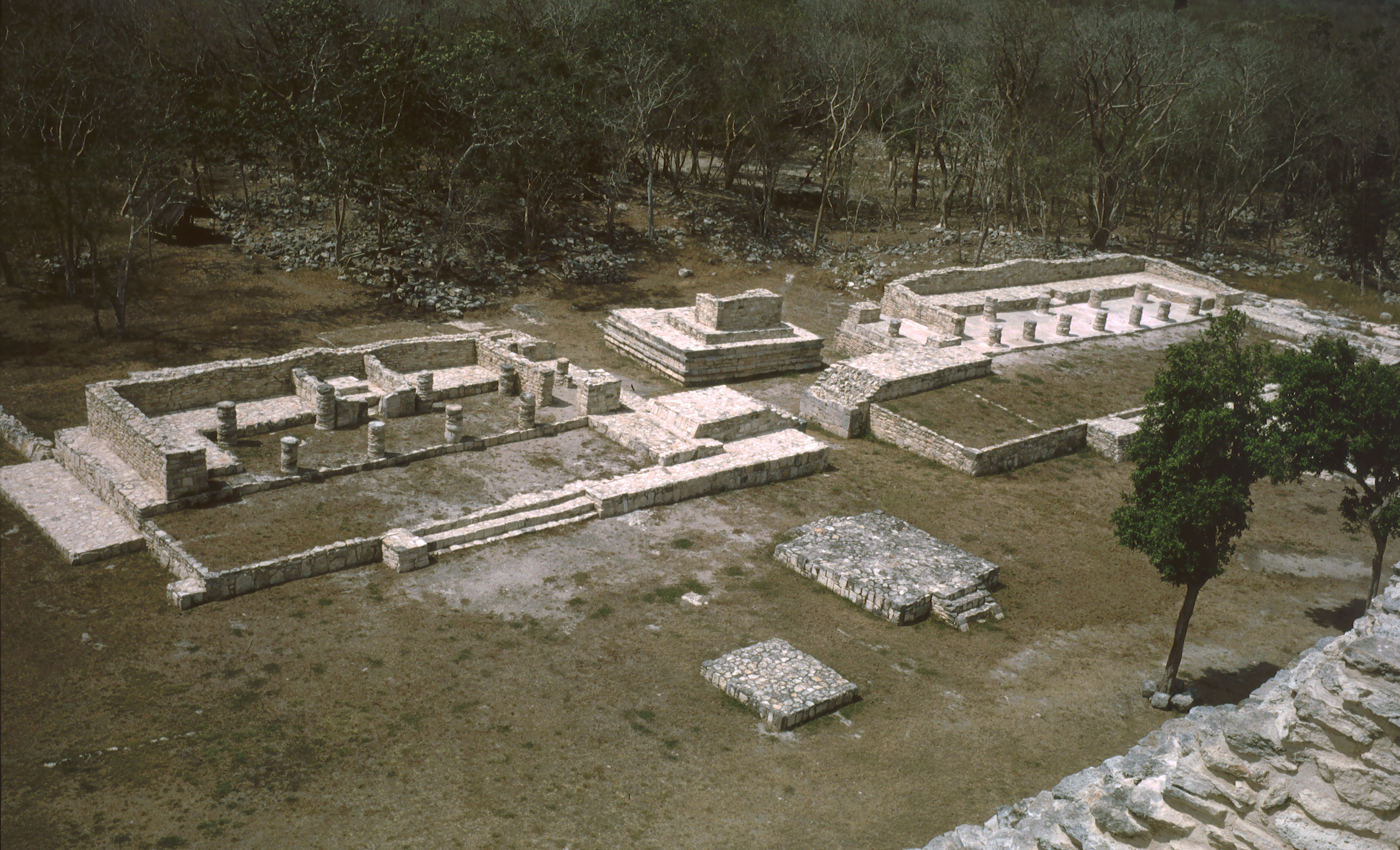
Columned hall, seen from the Kukulkan pyramid.

Mayapan was a major capital in the Yucatán, and there is extensive evidence that it had far-reaching trade routes, as seen in architecture and artifacts of other settlements in the region. A wide variety of goods were traded, including maize, honey, salt, fish, game, cloth, and birds.

=== Peten ===
Zacpeten on Lake Salpeten – Incense burners found at this site are nearly identical to those found at Mayapan. The temple assemblages at Zacpeten are very similar to those at Mayapan. Topoxte in Lake Yaxha, Peten also shares similarities of architecture and artifacts of effigy censers. Topoxte architectural remains show a similar stone carving style to Mayapan. Also, tiny "dwarf" shrines found at this site were very similar to shrines found at Mayapan. The two sites appear to have been abandoned around the same time, which may suggest a connection between their governments.

=== Highland Guatemala ===
Architectural and artifact connections are seen between Mayapan and the Utatlan in highland Guatemala. Examples are similar temple assemblages, the presence of skull imagery and squatting figures, extensive and lavish use of stucco combined with crude masonry, and effigy figure censers.

=== Yucatan East Coast ===
This region also shows apparent influence of Mayapan, in similar temple assemblages, similarities in architecture, effigy censers at some sites, and parallels between architectural decoration at Mayapan and some east coast sites. The east coast sites exported products such as cotton, salt, and honey from the Yucatán. Sites in Guatemala traded back cacao. El Chayal in Guatemala was the only source of the obsidian found at Mayapan.

=== Aztecs, Central Mexico, and the Campeche Coast ===
The presence of Matillas Fine Orange ceramics in Mayapan suggests trade with Tabasco. This area may have mediated trade between Mayapan and the rest of Central Mexico. Sculptures and murals at Mayapan suggest that there was contact between Mayapan and the rising Aztec empire. Some Mayapan figures showed details of Aztec dress, and what appears to be an Aztec deity is carved on an altar in Mayapan.

This evidence suggests a: "circum-Yucatecan trade route that linked Mayapan to Peten, northern Belize, and east-coast sites in the Late Postclassic period." (Melbrath & Peraza Lope 2003:24–31)

== Symbolism ==
- The symbolism present in Mayapan is particularly significant, partially because the center of the site is mainly used for ritual purposes. There are many similarities between the murals in Mayapan and the art and iconography of the Aztec and Mixteca-Puebla regions. Symbols that they have in common include:

- the sun disc (there are varying interpretations of what this represents

- Could represent the sun god
- However, the diving posture of the figure within the disc is a common motif used to represent a dead warrior, and because the figure is represented bound and with his heart removed it has been interpreted as a representation of a warrior sacrificed to the sun god.

- representations of Quetzalcoatl
- murals in structure Q.80 show reptile iconography which has been interpreted as participation in Mixteca-Puebla traditions. The dentition of the reptile indicate that they are serpents. There are similar representations found at Coba and on some pottery in Cholula dated to circa 1350–1550 AD.

(Milbrath, Susan., Carlos Peraza Lope, Miguel Delgado Kú. 2010)

- Serpent iconography is very common at Mayapan, serpent balustrade carvings are common throughout the ritual center in the complexes that are associated with the Cocom lineage like the Castillo (Milbrath, Susan., Carlos Peraza Lope, Miguel Delgado Kú 2010). In contrast depictions of the rain god Chaac are common to the temples related to the Xiu lineage. (Milbrath 2009:583) There are also depictions of the Monkey-man god
- Most of the iconography in Mayapan is found either in murals on the temple walls, stone carving, or carved stone covered in plaster.

== Evidence of inequality ==
Directionality may have played a role in the representation of inequality among the powerful factions of Mayapan. East and west were of primary importance because it represented the track of the sun through the sky. The east was associated with: life, males, and heat; whereas the west was associated with: death, females, and cold. This has led many sources to believe that the Itza and the Xiw may have been associated with east and west. There was very little evidence for obvious separation of residence between classes. This is mostly due to the residential center of Mayapan being located around the concentration of the water filled cenotes. Most residences are tandem structures made of several building within a separating wall. Many of these tandem structures include multiple residential buildings; the size of these residential buildings, relative to each other, suggests that some of them were for slaves. The integration of classes extends to the outer edges of the residential areas probably due to the convenience of being close to the agricultural fields. Some sources indicate that the analysis of oratorios or god-houses (large house-like shrines) show boundaries that were known to the people of Mayapan. This is shown in relation to the analysis of household oratorios and those oriented around the ceremonial center of Mayapan. Unfortunately there is very little skeletal evidence found in this region because of the composition of the soil. The goods found in different house structures do suggest different levels of social status, mainly in regard to the specialization of housing structures. There are at least two examples of obsidian workshops in Mayapan. The strongest evidence for inequality in Mayapan is found in the presence of deep shafts full of sacrificial victims, this suggests that the noble class had enough power to condemn some people to death.

== Abandonment ==
The site of Mayapan was abandoned sometime in the 15th century. There has been some dispute over when the actual abandonment took place. However, written records state that the site was abandoned in A.D. 1441. There appear to be several contributing factors to the abandonment of Mayapan. Around A.D. 1420 a riot was started by the Xius against the Cocom which culminated in the death of nearly all (if not in fact all) of the Cocom lineage. Pestilence may have been involved in the subsequent abandonment of the site by the remaining Xiu inhabitants. There were several sources of evidence to support this interpretation. Evidence of burned wood was found inside of structure Y-45a as well as burned roofing material on many of the other structures that was dated to around the time of the collapse in K’atun 8 Ahau (roughly A.D. 1441–1461). A mass grave in the main plaza, and bodies in a burial shaft covered in ash were dated to around the collapse and showed signs of violence, some of the bodies still had large flint knives in their chests or pelvises, suggesting ritualized sacrifice. Smashed vessels litter the floors of the Y-45a complex that date to around A.D. 1270–1400, prior to the documented collapse of Mayapan. A vessel bearing the glyph K’atun 8 Ahau was found on the floor of this complex. From this they have posited that the complex was abandoned finally when the city fell (Lope 2006; Milbrath 2003). After A.D. 1461 there is little evidence of altars and burial cists being constructed after 1461, suggesting that the site had been abandoned by this point (Lope 2006). Very little evidence has been found to support later usage of Mayapan. Copal from an altar was found in the Templo Redondo compound that may suggest later pilgrimages to the Castillo de Kukulkan. However, these samples date to the industrial era and may not be valid, so any assumptions based on this evidence would also not be valid (Lope 2006:168).
