= Tecoh =

Town in the Mexican state of Yucatán

- Municipal seat
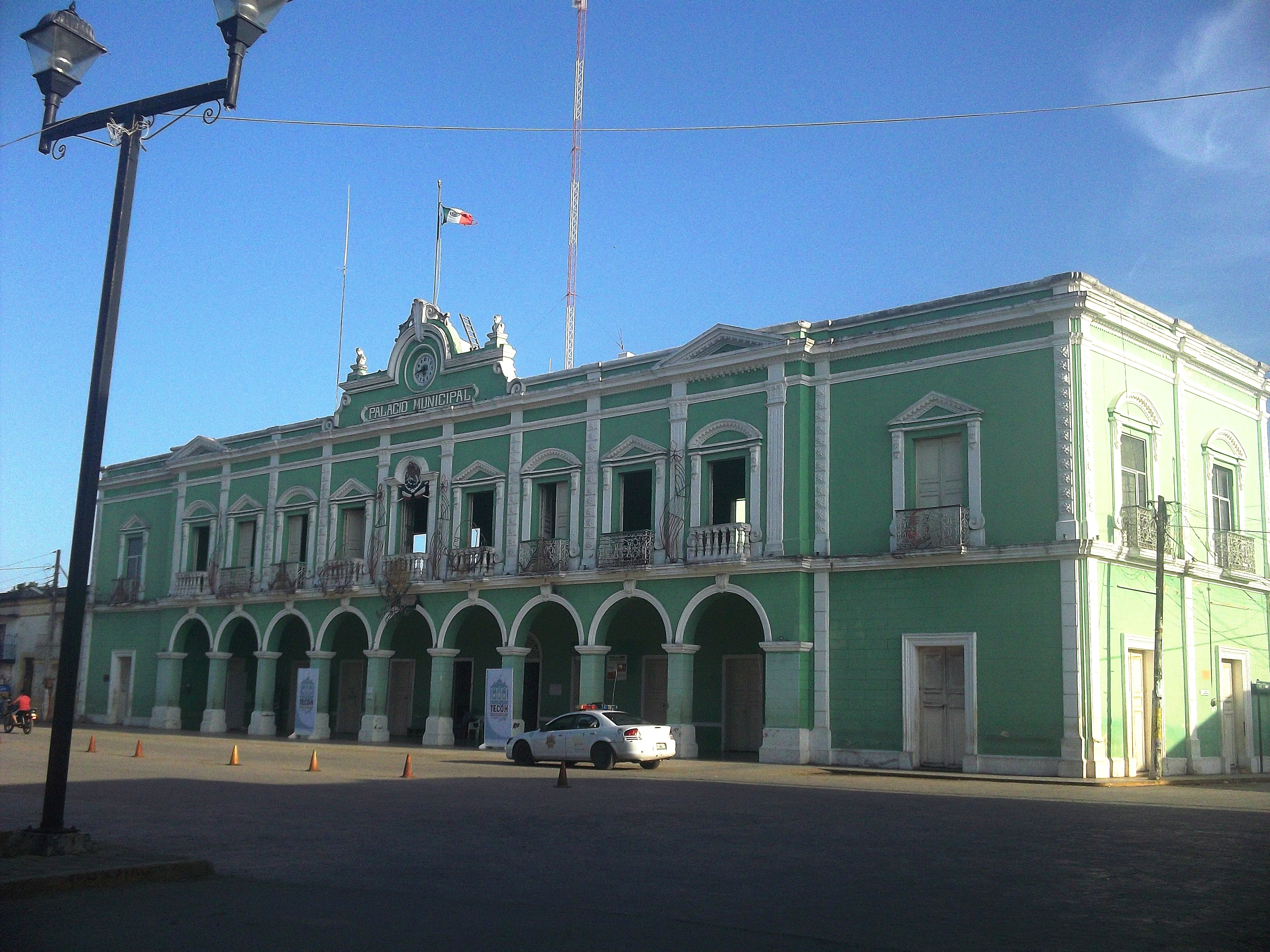
- Municipal Palace, 2012

- Location within Yucatán (state)
- Coordinates: 20°44′31″N 89°28′28″W
- Country: Mexico
- State: Yucatán
- Municipality: Tecoh
- Elevation: 16 m (52 ft)

Population (2010)
  - Total: 9,134

Tecoh is a town and the municipal seat of the Tecoh Municipality, Yucatán in Mexico.

== Gallery ==
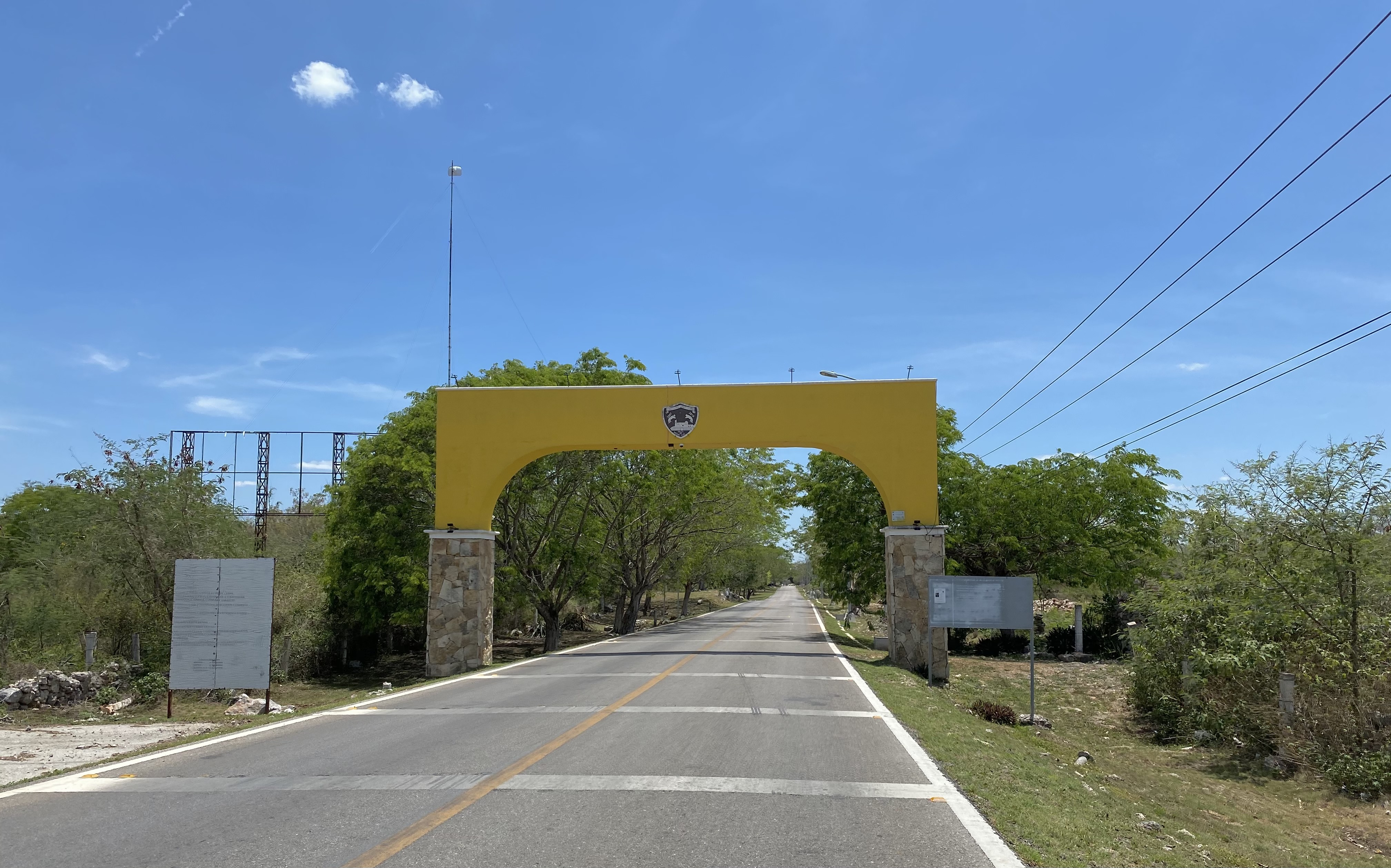
Arch of Tecoh

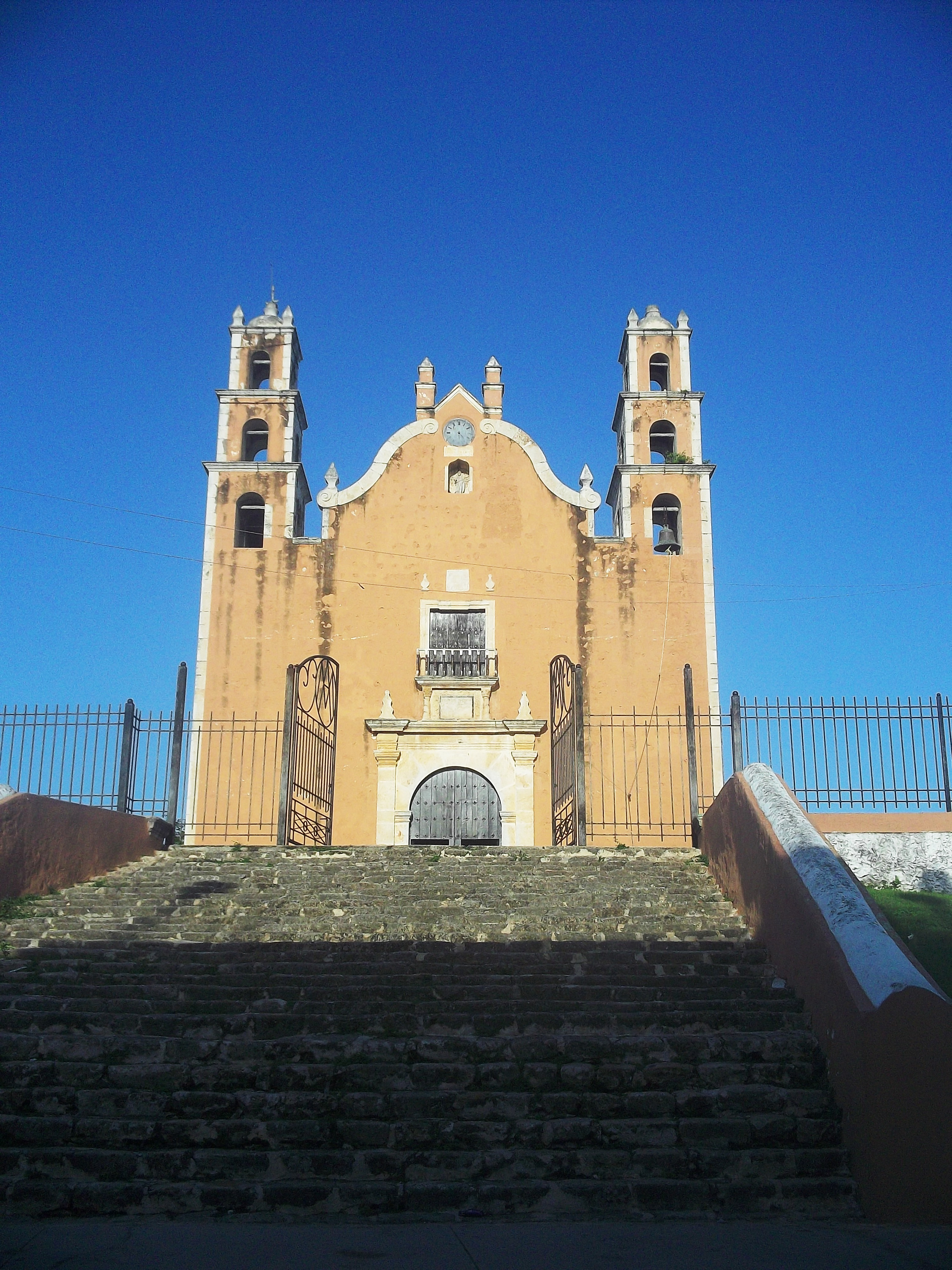
Tecoh main church: Parroquia de Nuestra Señora de la Asuncion (Parish of Our Lady of the Assumption)

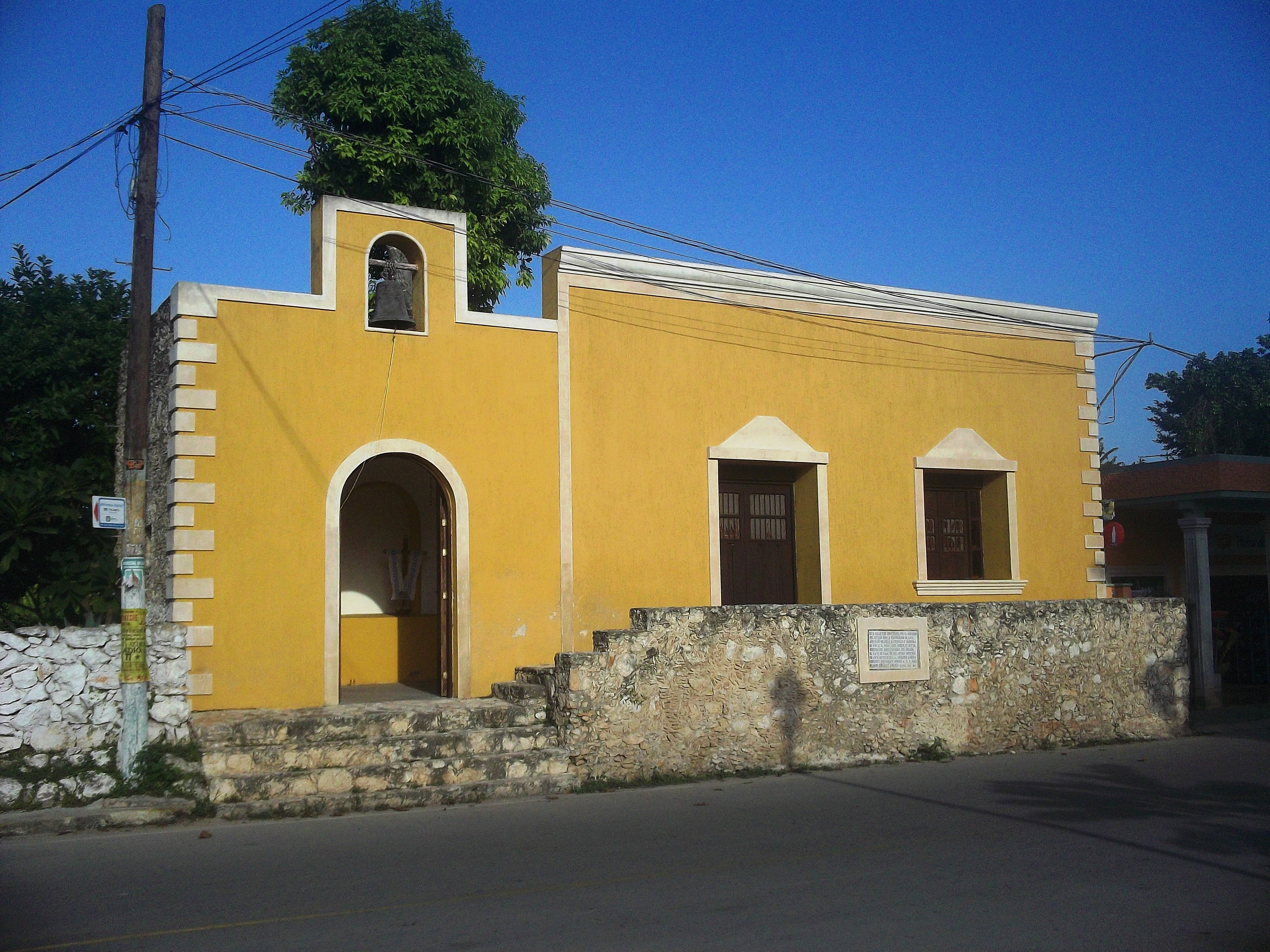
Tecoh Chapel.

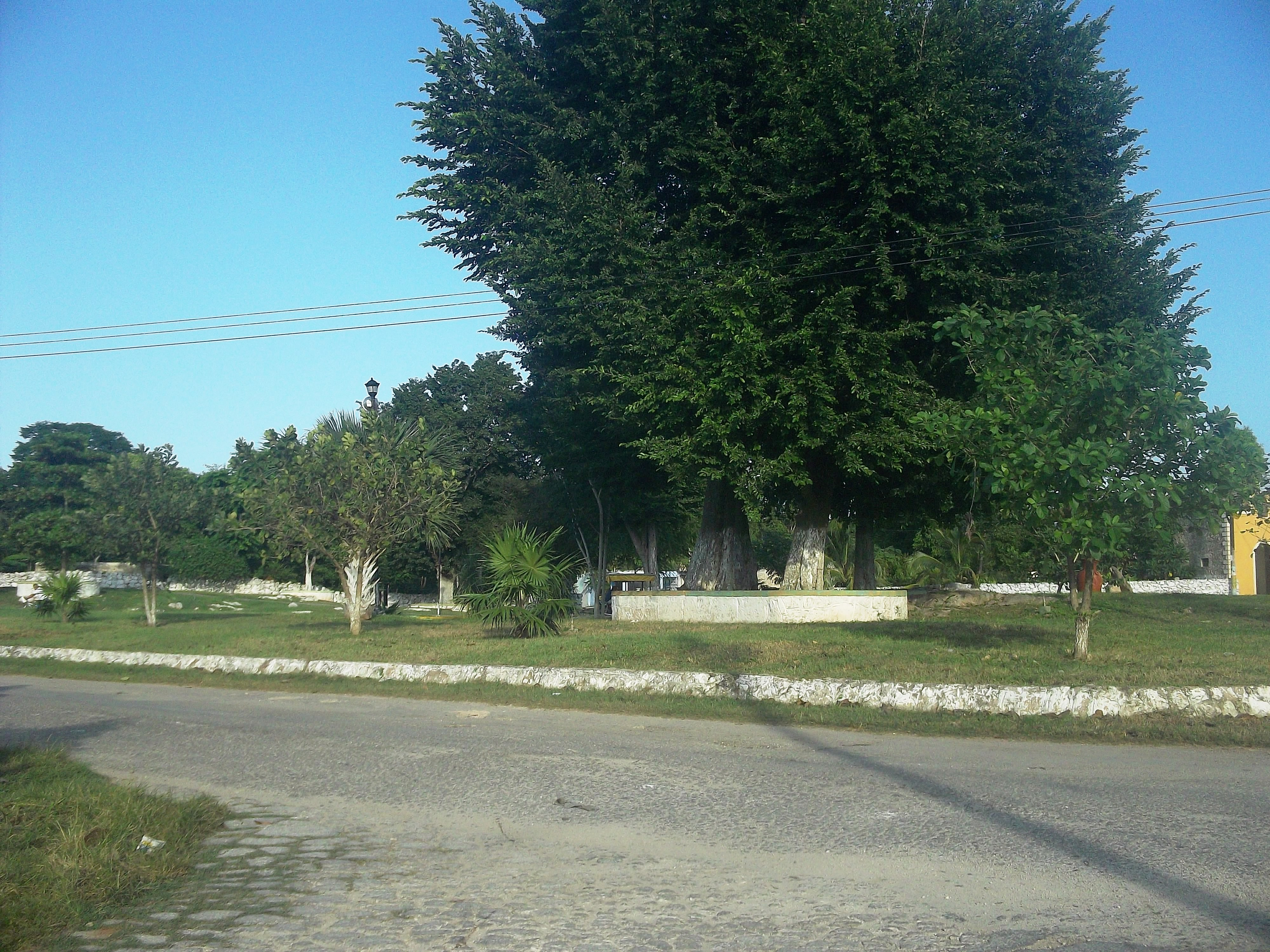
Tecoh Park.

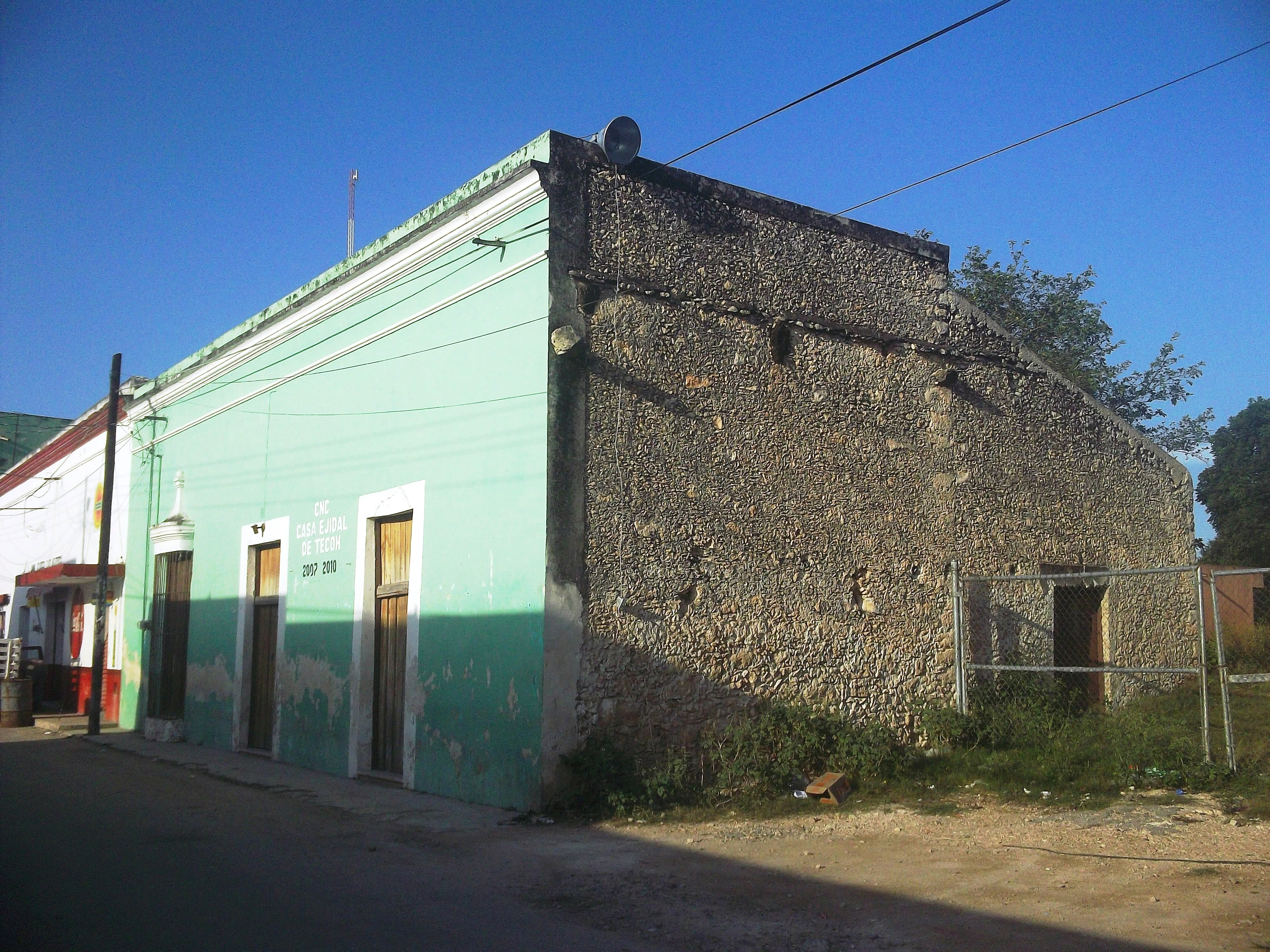
Tecoh Police House.

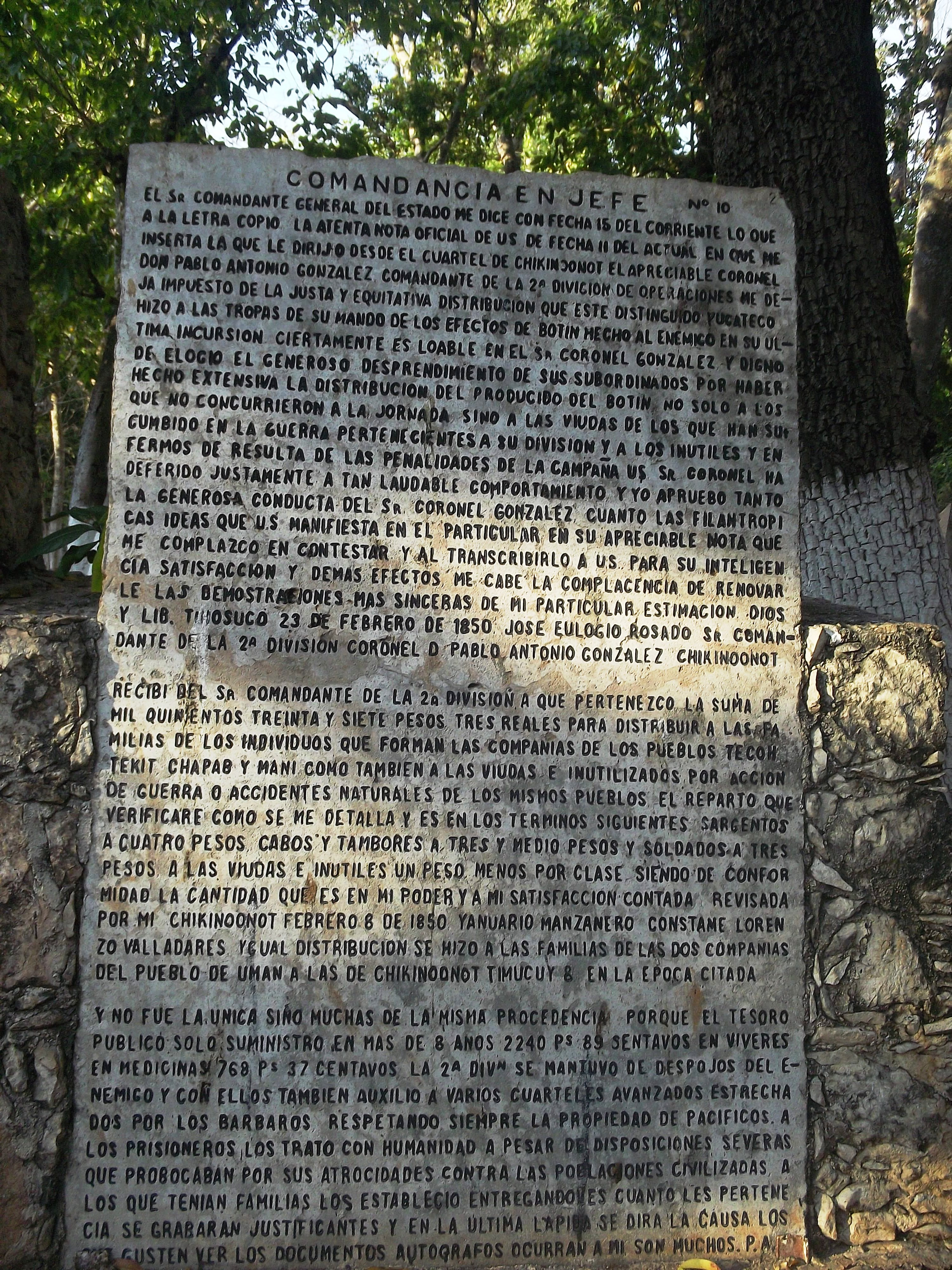
Engraved stone that narrates an episode of the Caste War that occurred in Tecoh.
