= Pachecos entrada =

Spanish military campaign, 1540s

- Part of the Spanish conquest of Yucatán
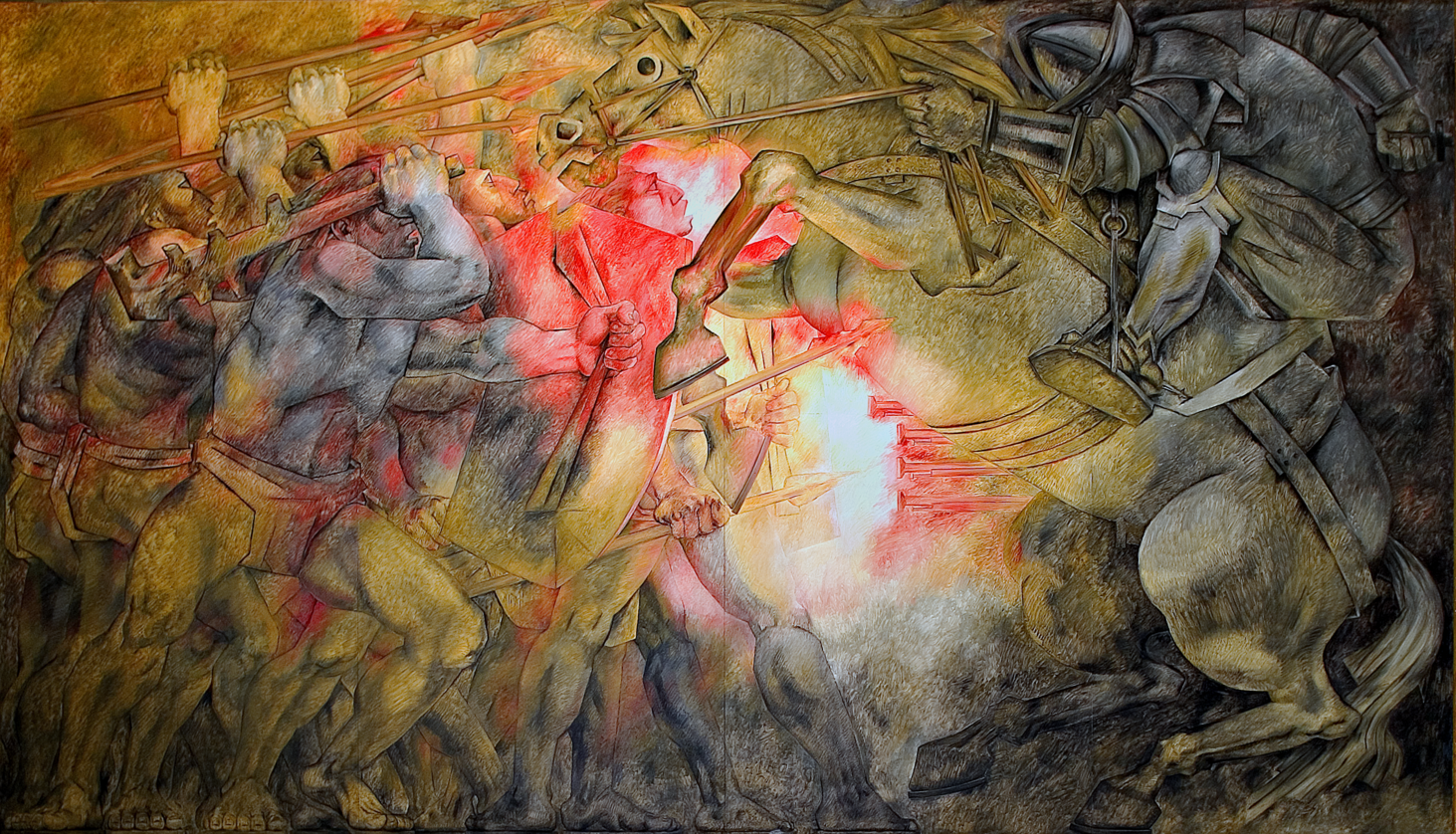
- La conquista by Castro Pacheco, 1974 (Note: Mural in Palacio de Gobierno in Merida, Yucatan. Depicts the Spanish conquest of Yucatan, showing (unarmoured) Maya clubmen and spearmen (left) charging armoured Spanish cavalry (right).)
Date	1543–1544, or 1544 (Note: Start date varies in literature: late 1543 in; 1544 in. End date of 1544 does not vary.)
Location	Southern Maya Lowlands
Result	Spanish victory
Territorial changes	Uaymil, Chetumal and Dzuluinicob annexed to Spanish Yucatan as Bacalar district

Belligerents
Uaymil (Note: A coastal Postclassic Maya polity just north of Chetumal, thought to have run up to Ascension Bay. (Note: At 19.7°N 87.5°W. See Bahía de la Ascensión.) Not to be confused with the eponymous archaeological site to the west.); Chetumal; Dzuluinicob; Mopan; Manche Ch'ol	New Spain; Spanish Yucatan

Commanders and leaders
Unknown (Note: The halach winiks (as commanders-in-chief) and nakoms ('commanding officers') of combatant polities. The halach winik of Chetumal is thought to have been the commander-in-chief of Uaymil.)	Gaspar Pacheco; Melchor Pacheco; Alonso Pacheco; Rodrigo Álvarez; Juan Gómez de la Camasa

Strength
unknown (Note: Archers and infantry.)	25 to 30 infantry

Casualties and losses
many killed (Note: Tens to hundreds killed in combat, plus tens to thousands starved to death. Including ill.); wounded unknown (Note: Including ill.); very many displaced (Note: Tens of thousands.); many settlements destroyed (Note: Tens to hundreds.)	< 10 killed; wounded unknown (Note: Including ill (at least one).)

The Pachecos entrada (Note: Also Pacheco for Pachecos; conquest, expedition or campaign for entrada.) was a Spanish military expedition against Postclassic Maya polities of the Southern Maya Lowlands, on the eastern coast of the Yucatán Peninsula, in what is now Belize and Quintana Roo, Mexico, in 1543 to 1544, or in 1544, during the Spanish conquest of Yucatán. It was commissioned by adelantado and governor Francisco de Montejo in early 1543, and led by conquistadors Gaspar, Melchor and Alonso Pacheco of new-found Mérida, in northern Yucatán. The military offensive resulted in the defeat of Uaymil, Chetumal, Dzuluinicob, Mopan and Manche Ch'ol, and in the annexation of the first three to Spanish Yucatán as Bacalar district, a subdivision of Yucatán ruled by the new cabildo of Salamanca de Bacalar, on Lake Bacalar. Maya residents of conquered polities were thereby made tributary slaves in encomiendas of Bacalar, and were allotted to expeditioners who settled Salamanca as vecinos in 1544. Except for the forceful repression of the Great Maya Revolt of 1546 to 1547, this entrada is considered the closing campaign of the 16th-century phase of the conquest of the Maya Lowlands, which extended to the 17th century with the Spanish conquest of Petén. The expedition is most noted in historical and Mayanist scholarship for its sweeping mass killings, which were deemed excessive even by Spanish contemporaries, and led to runaway demographic collapse of the Maya populace in Bacalar.

The opening leg of the Pachecos entrada involved a scorched earth and guerrilla defence by Uaymil and Chetumal, which the Spanish eventually overcame with the aforesaid indiscriminate attacks, possibly begun in an effort to stave off famine or a war of attrition. This prong further resulted in famine or famine-like conditions in the already war-torn Cochuah, just north of Uaymil, after the Pachecos requisitioned too much of the locals' foodstuffs, and impressed too many of them. The second and closing leg of the entrada is poorly understood, but is thought to have been successful against Dzuluinicob, Mopan and Manche Ch'ol. In the ensuing years of the 1540s, Bacalar vecinos were barred from the last two of these polities, following a protest by the Dominican friars who ruled Verapaz, in Spanish Guatemala. In addition, the Pachecos were convicted of crimes against Indians for their indiscriminate mass killings, and ordered to pay restitution, following calls for their criminal prosecution by Franciscan friars and vecinos of Mérida.

== Background ==
The conquistadors who first settled Spanish Cuba in the 1510s were the first Spanish colonists to turn their attention to the conquest of the Postclassic polities (kuchkabals) of the Maya Lowlands in the Yucatan Peninsula, lying west of Cuba. This first occurred in early 1517, when the Cordoba expedition by Francisco Hernandez de Cordoba returned to the island with news of vast lands (Yucatan) dotted with rich and splendid cities, previously unknown to the Spanish. The thrilling reports prompted the Grijalva and Cortes expeditions in 1518 and 1519, respectively, but the Cubans were soon rather engrossed in the conquest of the Aztec Empire, thus leaving the lowlands' subjugation for a later time.

On 8 November 1526, conquistador Francisco de Montejo secured a capitulacion ('letters patent') from the Spanish crown naming him adelantado of Yucatan, whereby he was authorised to conquer the lowland kuchkabals by force, annex their territory to the recently-founded New Spain, and settle and rule the colony so established (Spanish Yucatan). The adelantado thus kicked off the said conquest by personally leading an entrada to (Note: A 'sort of Spanish military expedition'.) the northern and eastern parts of the peninsula in mid-1527, including to the southeastern provinces of Uaymil and Chetumal. The named polities did not cede victory though, and so required a further entrada to the southeast, though this one likewise failed to defeat them by 1533.

By the early 1540s then, the western, northern and northeastern lowland kuchkabals had been conquered and thus annexed to Spanish Yucatan as the distritos ('districts') of the Campeche, Merida and Valladolid villas ('Spanish settlements'), respectively. With the exception of inland polities in the central lowlands (like the Peten Itza kingdom), this left only the southeastern provinces up for conquest by the said period, namely Uaymil, Chetumal, Dzuluinicob, Mopan and Manche Ch'ol.

== Entrada ==
Early conquistadors in Yucatan in 1526 to 1533 were accused of trading in Maya slaves and committing atrocities with their dogs of war (shown) by Casas in his Brevissima relacion (Note: Illustration depicts one to three such instances: Foreground: A sick Maya woman, realising she could not escape being torn apart by the conquistadors' dogs, took a rope and hanged herself after tying her one-year-old to her body, but the dogs got to the boy and tore him to pieces, though a cleric baptised him before he died.; Background: When conquistadors were leaving Yucatan (to conquer Peru in 1533), one of them (who used to boast of having "worked hard to impregnate many Indian women so that he could amass a larger sum of money when they were sold") invited the son of a certain Maya nobleman (batab or halach winik) along, but the boy declined him. The conquistador drew his dagger and sliced off both the boy's ears, but the latter still refused to join the former, so the conquistador laughed and cut off his nose and upper lip "as casually as if he were merely paring a fingernail".; Foreground: While a conquistador was "out hunting, his dogs, it seemed to him, were suffering from hunger, so he snatched a small infant from its mother's arms, hacked off its arms and legs, and threw a portion to each of the dogs; once these were devoured, he tossed the remains of its torso to them as well".)

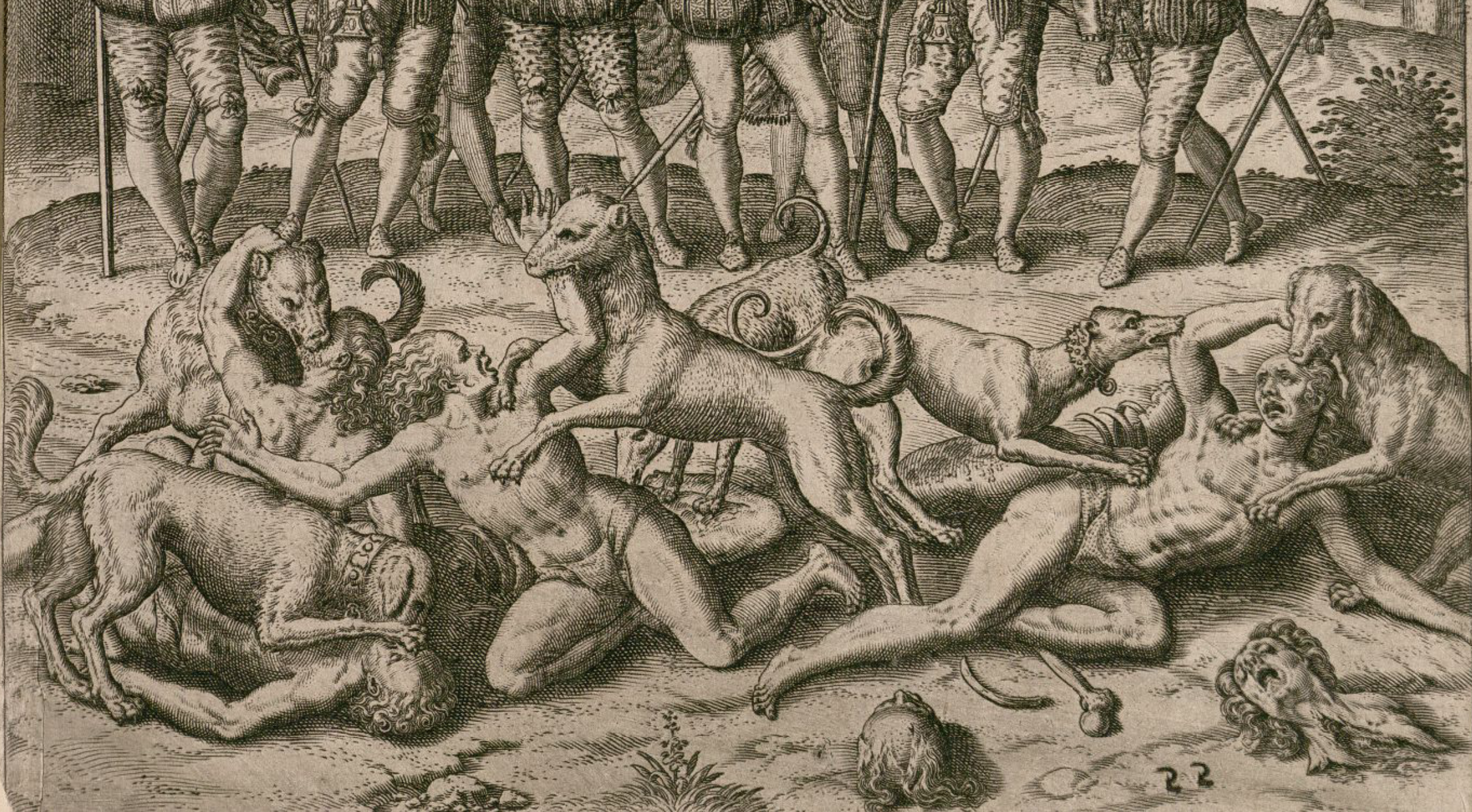
Like Montejo's men, Vasco Nuñez de Balboa was accused of (praised for) sicking dogs on some 40 Indian "sodomites" in Esquaragua (in Darien Gap) in September 1513 (shown) by Martyr of Angleria in his Decades (Note: During his isthmian crossing to the South Sea. The transgender victims, the slain cacique's sibling and others, "had been infected by that abominable sin against nature" and so "were clad in female attire, forbidden to handle bows and arrows like other men, and compelled instead to spend their lives performing the menial tasks usually assigned to women".)

In April 1543, Montejo commissioned Gaspar Pacheco to lead an entrada to the southeastern lowlands, to conquer coastal kuchkabals from Ascension Bay down to Golfo Dulce, which is to say, from Uaymil south to Manche Ch'ol. Pacheco thus recruited 25 to 30 vecinos of Merida as infantry for the campaign, and named his son Melchor his second-in-command, and his nephew Alonso Pacheco third-in-command.

The Spanish expeditioners set out on foot from Merida in late 1543 or early 1544. Upon marching through the former Cochuah kuchkabal, Pacheco requisitioned provisions and impressed locals to forcibly join as his Indian auxiliaries, much to the dismay of the war-stricken populace, who were thereby reduced to famine, or to famine-like conditions at a minimum. They next crossed into Uaymil and "began one of the bloodiest campaigns, and certainly the cruelest, of the entire conquest" of Yucatan, in the words of Carnegie Institution of Washington historian Robert S. Chamberlain. At this point though, the expeditionary leader was stricken ill, and thus forced to retreat to Merida, such that command now fell to Melchor Pacheco, whose second-in-command was his cousin Alonso.

Concurrent with the entrada's southerly march, however, Uaymil and neighbouring Chetumal had somehow gotten word of their impending arrival, as their authorities had apparently resolved to totally oppose the conquistadors with scorched earth and guerrilla warfare. As such, when the Spanish arrived at Uaymil and then Chetumal, time and again they came upon deserted settlements, barricaded thoroughfares and torched farms and orchards. This latter tactic soon proved trying for each side though, as the Maya and the Spanish both were equally forced to hunt and forage for their sustenance, thus drawing out what was meant to be a quick shock and awe campaign, which thereby threatened to devolve into a war of attrition. Faced with such dire straits, the Pachecos now "deliberately resorted to wanton acts of cruelty of a kind of which the Montejos (Note: Francisco de Montejo, his son and his nephew.) and their other principal captains were seldom, if ever guilty", according to Chamberlain. Consequently, the Spanish expeditioners reportedly began indiscriminately mass killing Maya men, women and children, regardless of combat status, in increasingly brutal ways. According to later Spanish records, they started killing "many" or "numbers" of people by beating them to death with garrotes, by drowning them in bodies of water, by setting perros de guerra ('war dogs') on them, or by slowly maiming or wounding them until their bodies gave out. Typical tactics purportedly included sicking dogs until victims were dead and their bodies mutilated; severing the hands, ears and noses of "many" people; severing women's breasts, tying gourds to their feet, and drowning them in lagoons; and tying prisoners to stakes, then loosing arrows and flogging them, over and over, in such a manner as to not immediately kill them, until they died of "natural" causes.

As said terror campaign dragged on, an apparently alarmed Rodrigo Alvarez, entrada recruit and former secretary to Montejo the Younger, "sought to persuade the Indians of Uaymil-Chetumal to accept Spanish dominion peacefully, but without the slightest success". Alvarez had previously been back to Cochuah to commandeer further food and supplies, possibly in a bid to facilitate a decisive Spanish victory, but "his efforts to obtain supplies without the use of force failed completely". At about the same time, Montejo the Younger and the Nephew both learnt of the ongoing indiscriminate mass killings, and reportedly tried to put a stop to them. The Pachecos evidently did not heed the Montejos though, and did not lawfully have to, as the latter lacked formal authority to give the former orders. In a similar vein, Chamberlain is of the opinion that the said "wanton acts of cruelty" would have been prevented or at least curtailed by either the adelantado or clergymen, but the former was elsewhere occupied, and so likely not even aware of the Pachecos' excesses, whereas the latter had not even been recruited, or else had declined to join the entrada.

In the end though, the Pachecos won out, as either the said campaign or else attrition itself "finally brought the Maya of Uaymil-Chetumal to their knees and the Spaniards to mastery of the province" in 1544. And so, Melchor founded a Spanish villa, christened Salamanca de Bacalar, on the banks of Lake Bacalar in former Uaymil, and forcibly resettled Maya survivors in reduccion villages and towns around it, thereby establishing the Bacalar district. He appointed the inaugural cabildo, designated twenty surviving conquistadors as vecinos of the villa, and allotted the new-found district's reduccion settlements as encomiendas to the same. According to cronista de Indias Diego Lopez de Cogolludo, "once the settlement was founded, the Conquistadors who had not been made vecinos returned to the City of Merida and debriefed their General [Gaspar Pacheco] on what happened, thereby ushering in a period of greater tranquilty [in Bacalar]; according to Bachiller Valencia, this took place towards the end of 1545".

At some uncertain point in 1544, the Pachecos pushed south of Chetumal to Golfo Dulce, across Dzuluinicob, Mopan and Manche Ch'ol territory. When exactly this occurred, and what exactly this entailed, however, is not clear. For Dzuluinicob in particular, whether the said polity was successfully conquered during this southern prong of the entrada, or not, is still an open question. According to University College London Mayanist Elizabeth A. Graham, its capital Tipu "does not appear on a [Bacalar] tribute list for 1544, but is recorded as an already established encomienda town in 1568, which indicates that it had functioned as part of an encomienda for some time. This, plus what is now [in 2011] known about the extent of the Pacheco conquest, suggests strongly that Tipu was brought into the encomienda system not long after the Pacheco conquest".

== Aftermath ==
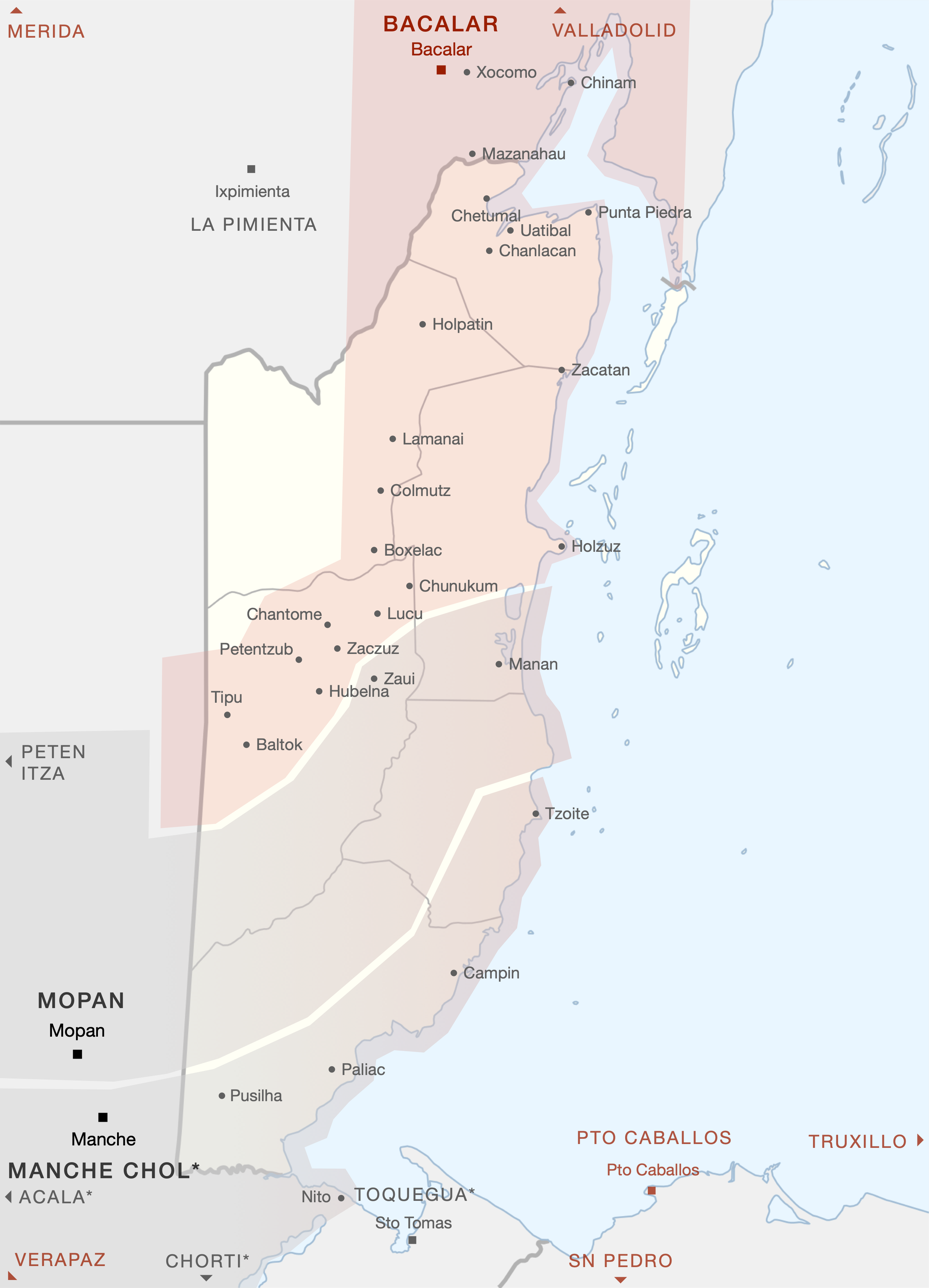
Bacalar district (top) and neighbouring Spanish (red) and Maya (grey) polities in the mid-16th century

Historical population of Bacalar district (Note: Estimated.)
Year	Pop.	±% p.a.
1511	150,000	—
1549	12,500	−6.33%
1580	1,000	−7.82%
1609	750	−0.99%
1639	700	−0.23%
1700	700	+0.00%
Source: Morandi 2010, p. 40.

The Pachecos entrada ultimately met their objectives, but only did so at great cost to both sides, as the precipitous collapse of the Maya population in former Uaymil and Chetumal left relatively few tributary slaves for vecinos' encomiendas in the new Bacalar district. The said kuchkabals had reportedly been heavily settled and wealthy, and so had naturally been expected to make for a thriving Spanish district upon conquest, but Bacalar remained an impoverished and sparsely-peopled outpost of Spanish Yucatan up to Spanish American independence in the 19th century. From 1544 to 1639, Salamanca itself only ever averaged a total population of 75, counting both Spanish vecinos and Maya servants in naboría ('household slaves'). (Note: Akin to encomienda, naboría was an institution in Spanish America requiring Amerindians to provide personal or household service to vecinos. See naboría.) According to Chamberlain and Graham, upon the villa's founding, "large numbers" of Maya survivors would likely have fled to nearby Maya territory in the central lowlands, closer to the unconquered Peten Itza kingdom, "in an attempt to place themselves beyond Spanish reach forever".

Sometime soon after 1544, the Dominican friars, including Bartolome de las Casas, who then governed Verapaz, in Spanish Guatemala, submitted a formal protest to the Real Audiencia de los Confines and Spanish crown, opposing the southern leg of the Pachecos entrada (to Golfo Dulce). The Dominicans claimed jurisdiction over Mopan and Manche Ch'ol territory, which abutted Verapaz, but adelantado Montejo (and thus the Pachecos) did so too. Eventually, the audiencia and crown ruled in favour of the friars, and definitively barred non-Dominicans from settling the area around the said gulf, thus bringing the entrada's efforts there (whatever they had been) to naught.

In the meantime, in Merida, Franciscan friars and some vecinos, having learnt of the Pachecos' "wanton cruelties" and been evidently scandalised by the reports reaching them, likewise petitioned the Spanish crown, asking that the said expeditionary leaders be criminally prosecuted. And so, by the late 1540s, a criminal case was opened, and the Pachecos charged, tried and convicted in the Council of the Indies, by promotor fiscal ('prosecutor') Villalobos. In a 1 June 1549 real cedula to the Audiencia de los Confines, the council announced that they had found the accused guilty "of robbing and killing and mistreating the native Indian men and women of those lands, who were at peace and serving the Christian Spaniards. By force and against their will they stabbed many and cut off the hands and noses of men ... and tied them to stakes and shot arrows at them until they died of natural causes. And they committed many cruelties and robberies not seen nor heard of heretofore". Consequently, the Pachecos were ordered to compensate surviving relatives of their victims 100,000 castellanos de oro. (Note: See castellano (moneda).) Melchor Pacheco, in particular, was singled out, as he was further stripped of his encomienda in Bacalar district.

== Legacy ==
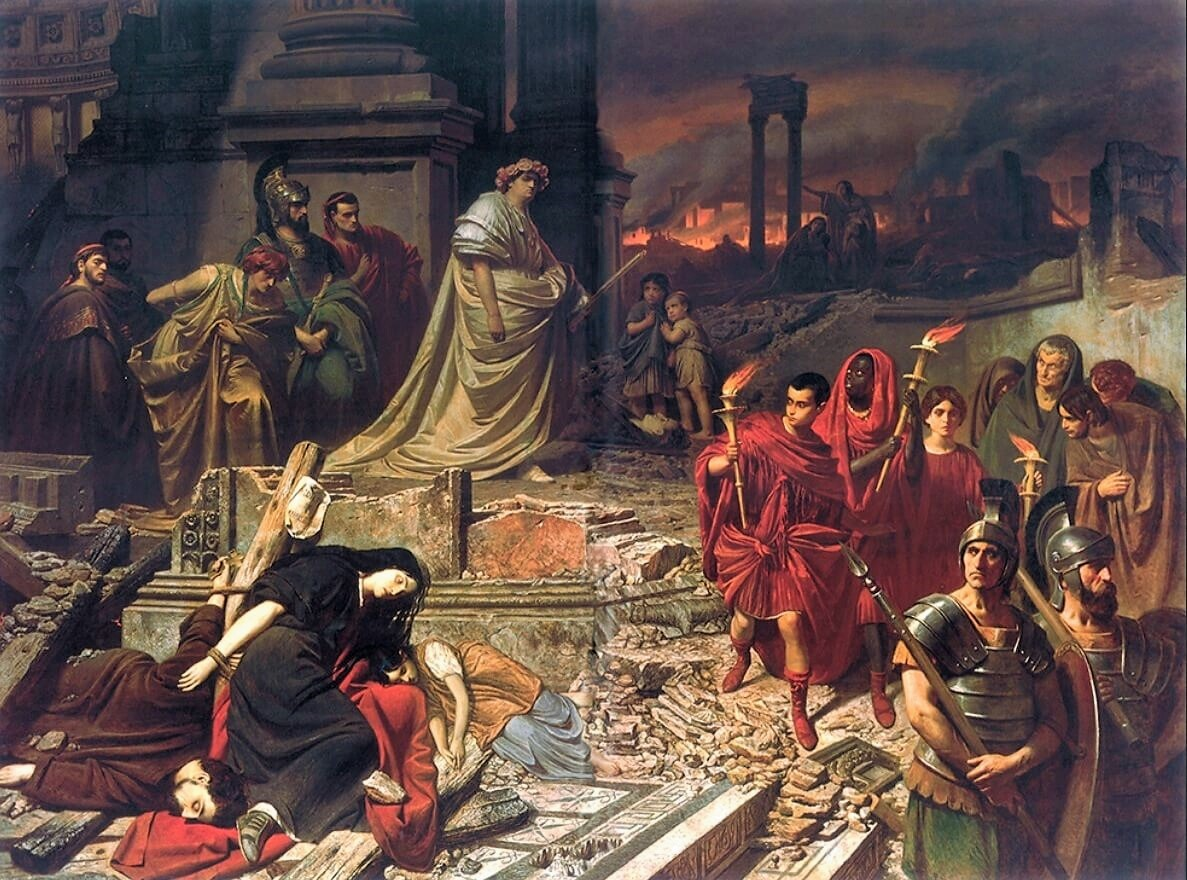
The Pacheco captain was likened to Nero (shown watching Rome burn), who "was not more cruel than this man" (Note: Nero Views the Burning of Rome by von Piloty, circa 1861.)

Hispano–Maya hostilities last broke out in former Bacalar during the Caste War of the 1840s to 1900s, which again involved reported atrocities by Hispanic people (Maya slave trading shown) (Note: 1974 Venta de indios mural by Castro Pacheco in Palacio de Gobierno in Merida, Yucatan. Depicts Maya adult and underage captives (centre) being led by armed Yucateco officers (sides) as Yucateco vecinos with a bag of coins sneer at them (right). Yucateco authorities were accused of selling Maya prisoners as slaves or indentured servants to Cuban plantation owners. Maya combatants of Chan Santa Cruz, encompassing former Bacalar district, were also accused of atrocities during this war. Residual conflicts continued to the 1930s.)

The Pachecos entrada is today most discussed in historical and Mayanist literature, where it is commonly noted for its indiscriminate mass killings, deemed excessive even by Spanish standards of the day. Chamberlain typifies scholarly views in saying, "The only campaign [of the conquest of Yucatan] which was accompanied by systematic ruthlessness of a wholly wanton nature was that of Gaspar Pacheco, his son Melchor and his nephew Alonso in Uaymil-Chetumal ... This conquest was one of extreme excesses. The natives, who resisted stubbornly, were slaughtered without mercy and the province was laid to waste. Many of those of the natives who succeeded in escaping fled beyond Castilian control. Relatively heavily peopled at the outset, the area became largely depopulated ... The reduction of Uaymil-Chetemal as contrasted with that of the remainder of the peninsula makes clear in striking fashion the manner in which differences in the characters and purposes of the conquistadores could determine the nature and methods of conquest".

The entrada's disrepute, however, dates to the 1540s. An often cited missive to Philip II by Franciscan friar Lorenzo de Bienvenida, dated Merida, 10 February 1548, is thought to have been representative of contemporary Spanish views on the matter. In it, Bienvenida informs the then-Prince of Asturias as follows.

As Your Highness is aware, the adelantado assigned a captaincy to Gaspar Pacheco, vecino of this city, about three and a half years ago, to conquer certain provinces of the Golfo Dulce, which lie between Honduras and Guatimala and this land. But due to this captain's poor command, he halted [his southerly march] in a pacified province called Cochua, the largest and even best of this land, about thirty leguas distant. There were many people here; they had been divided in repartimiento amongst this city's vecinos. They depleted the natives' stores of food, plundered the province and took tamemes [tlamemehs]. Since the Indian men fled to the bush for fear of the Spaniards, they took the women. And so died of hunger the majority of the Indians, such that the captain was unable to carry on for want of tamemes. He therefore came back, and gave the captaincy to a nephew of his, named Alonsso Pacheco. Nero was not more cruel than this man. He marched onwards and reached a province called Chetemal, which was at peace. And even though its natives did not wage war, he pillaged it and consumed the foodstuffs of the natives. They fled to the bush, fearing the Spanish, because as soon as he captured any of them, he set the dogs on them. And the Indians fled from all of this, and did not sow their crops, and all died of hunger. I say all, because there used to be settlements of five hundred and one thousand houses, and now a settlement of a hundred is large. This province was also rich in cacao. This captain, with his own hands, committed outrages: he killed many with the garrote, saying 'oh how well I've hit them!' He would cut the breasts off many women and the hands off men, and noses and ears, and tie them to stakes. And to the women, he would tie gourds to their feet and throw them into lagoons to drown, merely to amuse himself. He committed other great cruelties, which for want of space I leave out. He destroyed all of the province. The Spaniards there founded a villa of eight vecinos, called Salamanca, a scant settlement, with neither cleric nor a church. The vecinos there do not even confess, since the villa is sixty leguas from this city. If he had not destroyed the province, it would have supported thirty vecinos. And for his cruelties they sent this captain back to the province he destroyed, and gave him its best Indians, which is no small reward. Such is the justice rendered in this land.

== See also ==
- Tipu rebellion – in Bacalar district in 1638
- Fall of Nojpeten – last Maya polity conquered in 1697
- Guatemalan genocide – latest anti-Maya atrocities in Yucatan in the 1960s to 1990s
- List of Indian massacres in North America

== Notes and references ==
=== References ===
1. Barrera Vásquez, Alfredo; Bastarrachea Manzano, Juan Ramón; Brito Sansores, William; Vermont Salas, Refugio; Dzul Góngora, David; Dzul Poot, Domingo, eds. (1980). Diccionario maya Cordemex : maya-español, español-maya (1st ed.). Merida: Ediciones Cordemex. OCLC 7550928.
2. Biblio Ortiz, Juan Pablo (June–December 2018). "De Adelantado a pedigüeño: juicios contra Francisco de Montejo". Justicia Electoral. 1 (22): 179–215. ISSN 0188-7998.
3. Chamberlain, Robert Stoner (September 1939a). "Spanish Methods of Conquest and Colonization in Yucatan, 1527-1550. I". Scientific Monthly. 49 (3): 227–244. JSTOR 17057.
4. Chamberlain, Robert Stoner (October 1939b). "Spanish Methods of Conquest and Colonization in Yucatan, 1527-1550. II". Scientific Monthly. 49 (4): 351–359. JSTOR 16999.
5. Chamberlain, Robert Stoner (1948). The conquest and colonization of Yucatan, 1517–1550. Carnegie Institution of Washington Publication. Vol. 582 (1st ed.). Washington, DC: Carnegie Institution of Washington. hdl:2027/txu.059173008409431. OCLC 1843427.
6. Chamberlain, Robert Stoner (1953). The conquest and colonization of Honduras : 1502-1550. Carnegie Institution of Washington Publication. Vol. 598 (1st ed.). Washington, DC: Carnegie Institution of Washington. hdl:2027/txu.059173002179226. OCLC 1847435.
7. Díaz del Castillo, Bernal (1632). Historia verdadera de la conquista de la Nueva España (1st ed.). Madrid: En la Emprenta del Reyno. OCLC 85799759.
8. Fancourt, Charles St. John (1854). The history of Yucatan, from its discovery to the close of the seventeenth century (1st ed.). London: J. Murray. OCLC 1908914.
9. García Bernal, Manuela Cristina (2018). "Francisco de Montejo". Diccionario Biográfico electrónico. Real Academia de la Historia.
10. González Cicero, Stella María (1976). Yucatan, los Franciscanos y el primer obispo fray Francisco de Toral (1517 - 1571) (PhD). Mexico City: Colegio de Mexico.
11. González Ochoa, José María (2018). "Alonso González Dávila". Diccionario Biográfico electrónico. Real Academia de la Historia.
12. Graham, Elizabeth A. (2011). Maya Christians and Their Churches in Sixteenth-Century Belize. Maya Studies (1st ed.). Gainesville, FL: University Press of Florida. OCLC 751694131.
13. Herrera y Tordesillas, Antonio de (1730). Decada Quarta. Historia general de los hechos de los castellanos en las islas i tierra firme del mar oceano. Vol. 4 (1st ed.). Madrid: En la Imprenta real de Nicolas Rodiguez Franco. OCLC 15339062.
14. Jones, Grant D. (1989). Maya resistance to Spanish rule : time and history on a colonial frontier (1st ed.). Albuquerque, NM: University of New Mexico Press. hdl:2027/mdp.39015015491791. OCLC 20012099.
15. Landa, Diego de (2011). Relación de las cosas de Yucatán (Reprint of 1566 manuscript ed.). Barcelona: Linkgua. OCLC 960748072.
16. Lehmann, Christian (16 December 2018). "Ortografía". La lengua maya de Yucatán. Christian Lehmann.
17. López de Cogolludo, Diego (1688). Historia de Yucathan (1st ed.). Madrid: Jvan Garcia Infanzen. OCLC 12175609.
18. Mayfield, Tracie D. (2015). The Nineteenth-Century British Plantation Settlement at Lamanai, Belize (1837 – 1868) (PhD). Tucson, Ariz.: University of Arizona.
19. Means, Phillip Ainsworth (1917). History of the Spanish conquest of Yucatan and of the Itzas. Papers of the Peabody Museum of American Archaeology and Ethnology, Harvard University. Vol. 7 (1st ed.). Cambridge, Mass.: Peabody Museum of American Archaeology and Ethnology. OCLC 681599.
20. Ministerio de Fomento, ed. (1877). Cartas de Indias (1st ed.). Madrid: Impr. de M. G. Hernandez. hdl:2027/miun.adq6885.0001.001. OCLC 1862540.
21. Morandi, Steven J. (2010). Xibun Maya: The archaeology of an early Spanish colonial frontier in southeastern Yucatán (PhD). Boston, MA: Boston University.
22. Pendergast, David M. (1993). "Worlds in Collision: The Maya/Spanish Encounter in Sixteenth and Seventeenth Century Belize". Proceedings of the British Academy. 81 (sn): 105–143.
23. Quezada, Sergio (2014). Pueblos y caciques yucatecos, 1550-1580 [Maya lords and lordship : the formation of colonial society in Yucatán, 1350-1600]. Translated by Rugeley, Terry (Revised translation of 1993 Spanish ed.). Norman, OK: University of Oklahoma Press. OCLC 847529166.
24. Ries, Maurice Ruddell, ed. (1932). Middle American papers; studies relating to research in Mexico, the Central American Republic, and the West Indies. Middle American Research Series. Vol. 4 (1st ed.). New Orleans, LA: Dept. of Middle American Research, Tulane University of Louisiana. hdl:2027/mdp.39015010905951. OCLC 736389.
25. Rushton, Elizabeth A. C. (2014). 'Under the shade I flourish' : an environmental history of northern Belize over the last three thousand five hundred years (PhD). Nottingham, Eng.: University of Nottingham.
26. Vazquez Barke, Gabriela (August 2012). Bacalar en el siglo XVII: colonización y resistencia (MA). Mexico City: Centro de Investigaciones y Estudios Superiores en Antropología Social.
27. Zamora Castellanos, Pedro (September 1941). "Monografías departamentales : Izabal : Extracto de un estudio, por el socio, General e Ingeniero Pedro Zamora Castellanos". Anales de la Sociedad de Geografía e Historia. 17 (3): 168–187.
