= Davila entrada =

Spanish military campaign, 1531–1532

Davila campaign
- Part of the Spanish conquest of Yucatan
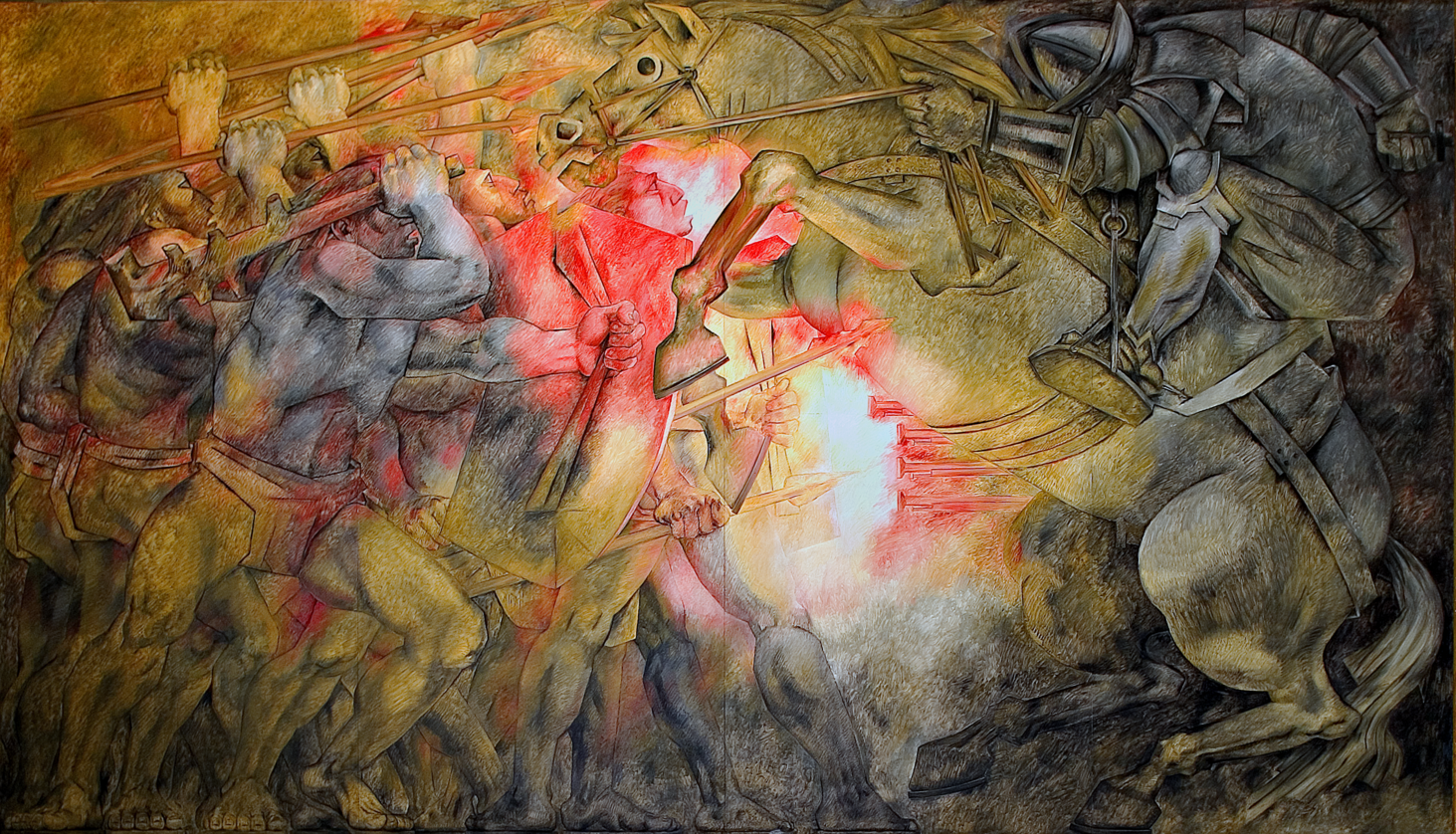
- La conquista by Castro Pacheco, 1974 (Note: Mural in Palacio de Gobierno in Merida, Yucatan. Depicts the Spanish conquest of Yucatan, showing (unarmoured) Maya clubmen and spearmen (left) charging armoured Spanish cavalry (right).)
Date	mid 1531 to late 1532
Location	Southern Maya Lowlands
Result	Maya victory

Belligerents
Chetumal; Cochuah; Waymil (Note: A coastal Postclassic Maya polity just north of Chetumal, thought to have run up to Ascension Bay (Bahía de la Ascensión) at 19.7°N 87.5°W. Not to be confused with the eponymous archaeological site to the west.)	New Spain; Spanish Yucatan

Commanders and leaders
Nachan Kan; Gonzalo Guerrero; Waymil batabs	Alonso Davila (Note: Also surnamed Dávila, de Avila, de Ávila.); Martín de Villarubia; Francisco Vázquez; Montejo the Nephew; Cristóbal Cisneros; Blas Maldonado; Alonso de Arévalo

Strength
Unknown (Note: At least: 1 polity's forces; 1 polity's and 2 settlements' forces or militia.)	c. 50 men (Note: Including 13 cavalry.)

Casualties and losses
Unknown (Note: At least: many men killed; 1 batab's retinue wounded; over 60 men and some merchants captured or detained; over circa 600 civilians conscripted or impressed; 2 settlements dislocated; some settlements raided; over circa 600 to 1,000 pesos' worth in valuables or goods lost.)	Unknown (Note: At least: 11 killed; 10 wounded; 8 horses lost.)

The Davila entrada (Note: Also Dávila, de Avila, de Ávila for Davila; expedition or campaign for entrada. Entradas were 'a sort of Spanish military expedition'.) was a Spanish military expedition of conquest against Postclassic polities of the Southern Maya Lowlands, in the Yucatan Peninsula, in 1531 to 1532, during the Spanish conquest of Yucatan, part of the broader conquest of the Maya. The campaign was led by Alonso Davila and commissioned by Francisco de Montejo, adelantado and governor of Spanish Yucatan, a recently founded province of New Spain, as a follow-up to the larger Montejo entrada of 1527 to 1528, which had failed to subdue Maya polities south of Waymil, in modern Quintana Roo, Mexico and Belize. The expedition initially went well for Davila, who marched through Cochuah and Waymil to Chetumal unopposed, founding Villa Real, an administrative centre for pacified polities, in the latter's port in the summer of 1531. Things soon turned south for the conquistadors though, as first Waymil and then Cochuah rebelled against Spanish dominion, leading to a protracted siege which ultimately saw the expeditioners routed from Villa Real in the autumn of 1532. A Spanish victory was thus frustrated for a second time, and Davila's retreat itself was, notably, a seven-month odyssey on Postclassic trading canoes to southern Spanish Honduras.

== Background ==
The Cordoba expedition by Francisco Hernandez de Cordoba is commonly credited with bringing the Maya civilisation to the attention of Spanish conquistadors newly settled in Spanish Cuba in early 1517. Cordoba's discovery of the Maya Lowlands in the Yucatan Peninsula prompted adelantado Francisco de Montejo to petition and receive, in late 1526, a capitulacion ('letters patent') from Charles I for the conquest of Postclassic Maya polities in said lowlands, first attempted to inconclusive results during the Montejo campaign of mid-1527. This first foray into the eastern lowlands having been frustrated, the adelantado now shifted his efforts to the northern and western lowland polities, and successfully conquered Chakan, Can Pech, and Ah Canul within a few years, and thereby annexed their territory to new-found Spanish Yucatan, a province of New Spain. The victory prompted Montejo, in early 1531, to charge his second-in-command, Alonso Davila, with replicating their recent wins on the eastern coast of the peninsula, with the former providing the latter some fifty men for the task.

== Entrada ==
Davila itinerary (Note: Approximate or possible locations (labelled approximate) in . Exact or approximate Tapaen, Waymil location is not known (labelled unknown). Centroid location is used for polity-only entries.)
1 Cochuah
2 Chable, Waymil (approximate)
3 Maçanahau, Waymil (approximate)
4 Bacalar, Waymil
5 Chetumal, Chetumal (approximate)
6 Villa Real, Chetumal (approximate)
7 Chequitaquil, Chetumal
8 Bacalar, Waymil
9 Maçanahau, Waymil (approximate)
10 Chable, Waymil (approximate)
11 Villa Real, Chetumal (approximate)
12 Bacalar, Waymil
13 Cochuah
14 Villa Real, Chetumal (approximate)
15 Tapaen, Waymil (unknown)
16 Villa Real, Chetumal (approximate)

Chetumal Bay (north on right) (Note: The eponymous port capital of Chetumal (and thus Villa Real) reportedly lay four leguas north or south of Rio Hondo, in modern Santa Rita, Corozal (labelled 2) or in a site (labelled 3) just off modern Chetumal, Quintana Roo.)

1	Rio Hondo
2	Chetumal/Villa Real (south)
3	Chetumal/Villa Real (north)

4	Bacalar
5	Chequitaquil
6	Beyond the barrier reef

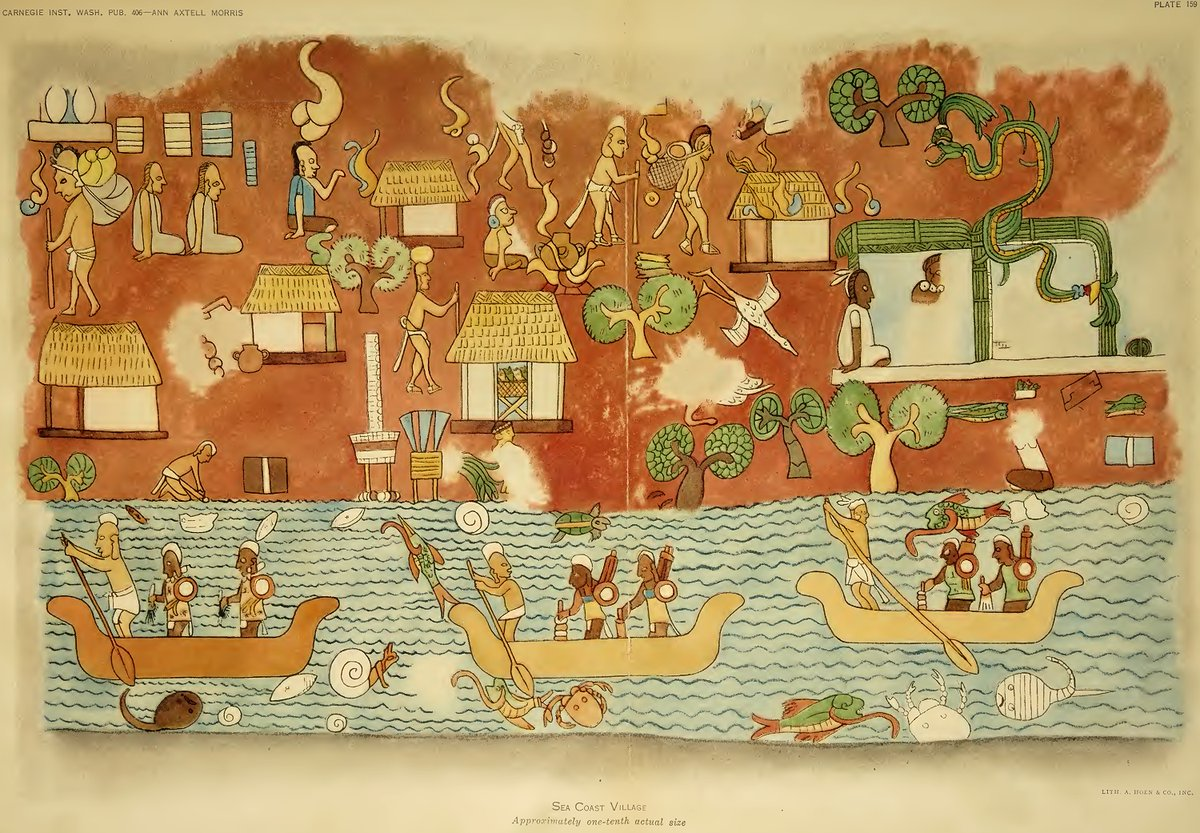
A Postclassic coastal village (top) with a convoy of laden canoes (bottom). (Note: Postclassic fresco in the Temple of the Warriors in Chichen Itza, Yucatan. Tracing in 1931 by Ann Axtell Morris.) Chetumal (and so Villa Real) is thought to have been a port of call in the regional coasting trade in the Late Postclassic (14th to 15th centuries) at least.

The Davila party set out on foot from the eponymous capital of former Can Pech in mid-1531, due east. They marched through the adjoining Mani and Cochuah polities unopposed, shortly thereafter reaching Chable, a town in the Waymil province. The settlement's principal inhabitants received them well (either willingly or by force of arms), promptly despatching runners to the provincial capital, Bacalar, to summon the leading batab or 'mayor' (cacique principal to the Spanish). This summons was straightforwardly rebuffed, with the batab notably declaring they would give Davila "fowls in the form of lances and maize in the form of arrows". Davila therefore carried on his march, leaving half his men in Chable, and taking (by will or force) a number of the townsfolk who had helped him.

They next reached Maçanahau, a large town close to Lake Bacalar. Being well received, the Spaniards sojourned here for three weeks, during which time prominent residents of Chable, Maçanahau, and nearby Yuyumpeten (all in Waymil) seem to have successfully lobbied the batab of Bacalar to not oppose the Spanish entrada. (Note: Entradas were 'a sort of Spanish military expedition'.) Consequently, Davila continued their march south unopposed. In Bacalar, they soon discovered that an overland march to Chetumal (during the wet season) would not be possible. Maritime transport aboard several trading canoes was thus arranged. The flotilla navigated from the lake into the upper Chetumal Bay, from where they coasted south into the harbour of Chetumal (port capital of an eponymous polity south of Waymil), and disembarked unopposed, as the port had been deserted. Here, Davila rechristened the settlement Villa Real (per the adelantado's instructions) and sent for the men who had been left in Chable.

=== Siege ===
At some uncertain point prior to the Spaniards' arrival, Nachan Kan, halach winik or 'governor' of Chetumal, and Gonzalo Guerrero, a nakom or 'commanding officer', had evacuated the port and retired with their forces to Chequitaquil, a coastal town four leagues north of the same. Within two months of Villa Real's founding, however, Davila had discovered the encampment, and sent a detachment of some 25 men to take them by surprise. The assault was a partial success, as Kan and Guerrero apparently managed to evade capture, though at great cost to their own men (many dead, over 60 captured, and all others dispersed).

Now safely ensconced in Villa Real, Davila set out with twenty men on a survey of the newly-Spanish territory towards Maçanahau. In Bacalar, though, and to their great surprise, the Spanish were informed that residents of Maçanahau and other Waymil towns had now resolved to oppose them. The towns and their access sak bes or 'roads' had been barricaded, but the native opposition was soon routed (first in Maçanahau, then in Chable). In the time it took to effect this, however, the recently conquered Cochua province had apparently revolted too. Davila therefore returned south to Villa Real to resupply, and set off north with 22 men to suppress the new rebellion, leaving some twenty-odd men in the villa or 'small Spanish town'. Along the way (in Bacalar), Davila conscripted some 600 civilians from neighbouring settlements (including many prominent ones).

Unlike the limited opposition in Waymil, the Cochuah revolt proved serious and widespread, forcing Davila to abort their incursion and retreat to Villa Real. The Spanish now found themselves under heavy siege, and with only some thirty men fit for combat, five war horses, and depleting stores, their situation was precarious.

In a bid to better their lot, and being forewarned of a sizeable trading convoy of laden dugout canoes soon to pass by the port en route to Rio Ulua (in Toquegua territory), Davila next had the merchants captured and their goods seized. One of the captives proved to be the son of the batab of Tapaen (in Waymil), and so was held hostage whilst two other captives were sent to summon his father, who promptly called. The batab was given a month to secure communication with the adelantado (last in the Can Pech capital), and promised his son in return. However, believing his son would be released regardless, the batab dallied until the deadline, whereupon Davila had him and his retinue tortured. To prove "whether the son had more love for the father, than the father had for the son", the captain now despatched the batab's son himself to Can Pech (likewise given a month), keeping the father hostage. This second month came and went without the adelantado's reply, after which Davila led a detachment to Tapaen, only to be informed that the son had made no attempt to reach Can Pech.

The siege, meanwhile, did not let up, and was rather sustained for months, during which the Spanish became increasingly convinced that their position was untenable. Finally, in the autumn of 1532, Davila and the cabildo or 'Spanish town council' of Villa Real resolved to abandon their gains and retreat to Truxillo, in Spanish Honduras. The besieged men thus dismantled the villa and, surreptitiously, aboard 32 trading canoes piloted by (impressed) local merchants, set off due south of Rio Hondo.

== Aftermath ==
The Spanish retreat soon devolved into a trying odyssey of seven months, as the conquistadors made poor canoers, and the inner Honduras Bay waters and southeastern lowland coast proved treacherous to navigate on small craft, despite able piloting. They reportedly progressed a meagre six to seven leagues a day, with raids on riverine settlements (in Chetumal, Dzuluinicob, Mopan, Manche Chol) and seizures from travelling merchants supplementing their dwindling provisions. The men, at last, reached Puerto Caballos (in Spanish Honduras) in the spring of 1533. The siege's success would provide a reprieve for the eastern lowlands until late 1543, when the Pachecos entrada would finally bring the polities there under Spanish dominion.

== See also ==
- Pachecos entrada – similar campaign in 1543

== Notes and references ==
=== References ===
1. Arranz Márquez, Luis (2018). "Pedro de Ledesma". Diccionario Biográfico electrónico. Real Academia de la Historia.
2. Chamberlain, Robert Stoner (1948). The conquest and colonization of Yucatan, 1517–1550. Carnegie Institution of Washington Publication. Vol. 582 (1st ed.). Washington, DC: Carnegie Institution of Washington. hdl:2027/txu.059173008409431.
3. García Bernal, Manuela Cristina (2018). "Francisco de Montejo". Diccionario Biográfico electrónico. Real Academia de la Historia.
4. González Hernández, Cristina (2018). "Gonzalo Guerrero". Diccionario Biográfico electrónico. Real Academia de la Historia.
5. Jones, Grant D (1989). Maya resistance to Spanish rule : time and history on a colonial frontier (1st ed.). Albuquerque, NM: University of New Mexico Press. ISBN 082631161X.
6. Roys, Ralph L. (1957). The Political Geography of the Yucatan Maya. Carnegie Institution of Washington Publication. Vol. 613 (1st ed.). Washington, DC: Carnegie Institution of Washington.
7. Varela Marcos, Jesús (2018a). "Juan Díaz de Solís". Diccionario Biográfico electrónico. Real Academia de la Historia.
8. Varela Marcos, Jesús (2018b). "Vicente Yáñez Pinzón". Diccionario Biográfico electrónico. Real Academia de la Historia.
