= Chetumal province =

Maya polity in Yucatan, dissolved 1544

Coordinates: 18.09°N 88.43°W

Chetumal u kuchkabal Chakte'mal (Yucatec Maya)
- during 10th to 16th cent.–1544
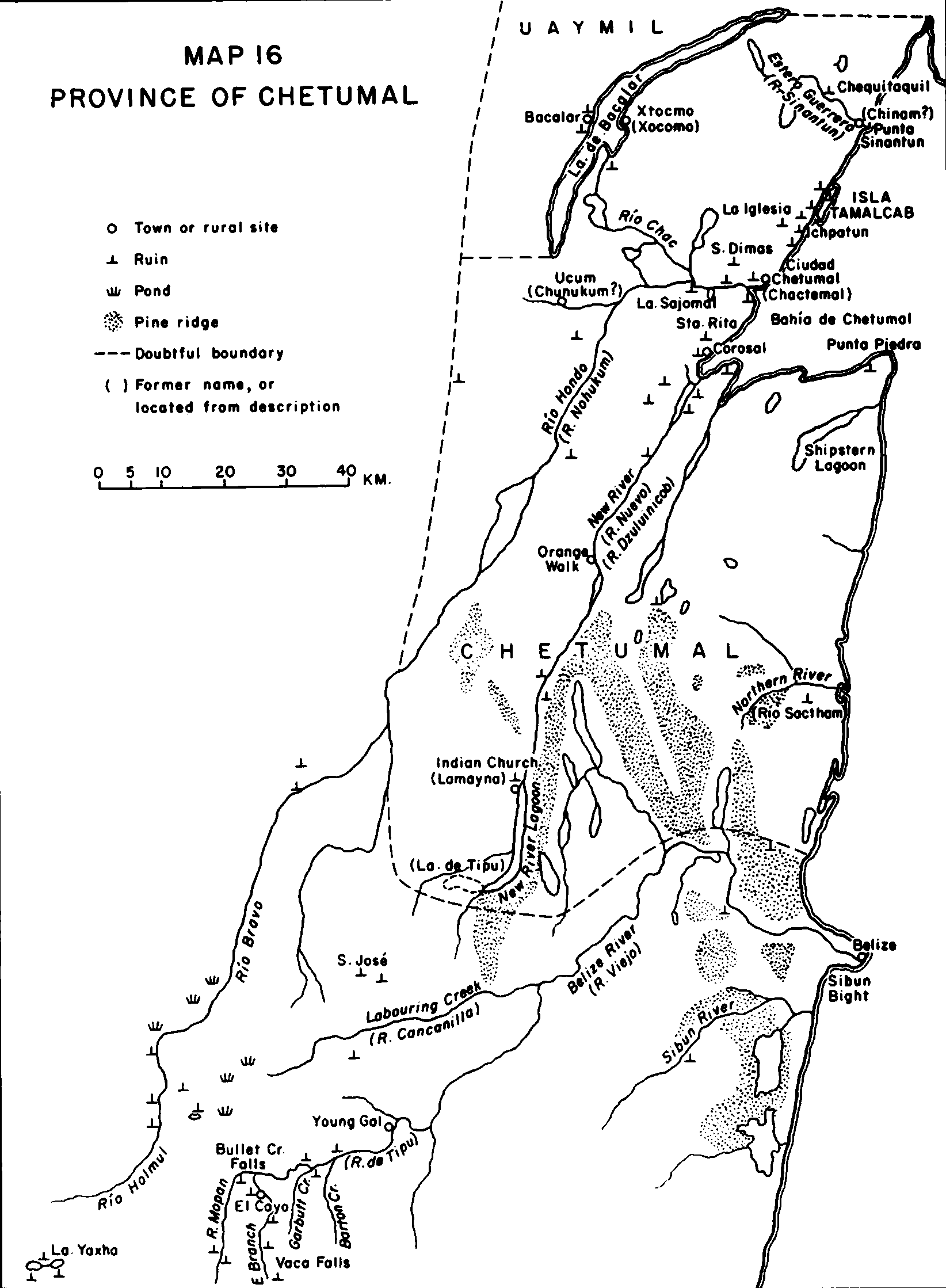
- Status: Dissolved
- Capital: Chetumal
- Common languages: Yucatec Maya
- Religion: Maya polytheism
- Government: Unitary kuchkabal
- Halach winik
  - c. 1514 to 1544: Nachan Kan (last)
- Historical era: Postclassic to Spanish
  - Established: during 10th to 16th cent.
  - Guerrero's arrival: 1514
  - Montejo entrada: 1528
  - Davila entrada: 1531–1532
  - Pachecos entrada: 1544
Succeeded by
Spanish Yucatan
- Today part of: Belize; Mexico

Chetumal (Note: Also Chakte'mal, Chacte'mal, Chaktemal, Chactemal; often preceded or succeeded by province or Province (as in Province of Chetumal or Chactemal province). Pronounced /ˌtʃɛtʊˈmɑːl/ che-tuu-MAHL. Natively u kuchkabal Chakte'mal.) was a Postclassic Maya polity (kuchkabal) in the Maya Lowlands, in what is now northern Belize and southern Quintana Roo, Mexico. It is thought to have been established in or prior to 1514, possibly during the Postclassic period, and to have been annexed by Spanish Yucatan in 1544, upon the successful Pachecos entrada. Its last known governor (halach winik) was Nachan Kan (Note: Also Nachan Can.) (fl. c. 1514–1544), who notably led his province during the Spanish conquest of Yucatan, alongside his slave and later son-in-law, Gonzalo Guerrero, a stranded Spanish sailor. The former province has been the subject of Mayanist study since the late 19th century, and is notable in popular culture as one of the last coastal kuchkabals conquered by the Spanish, and for the Guerrero–Kan family, who are thought to number amongst the earliest Mestizo families in the New World.

== History ==
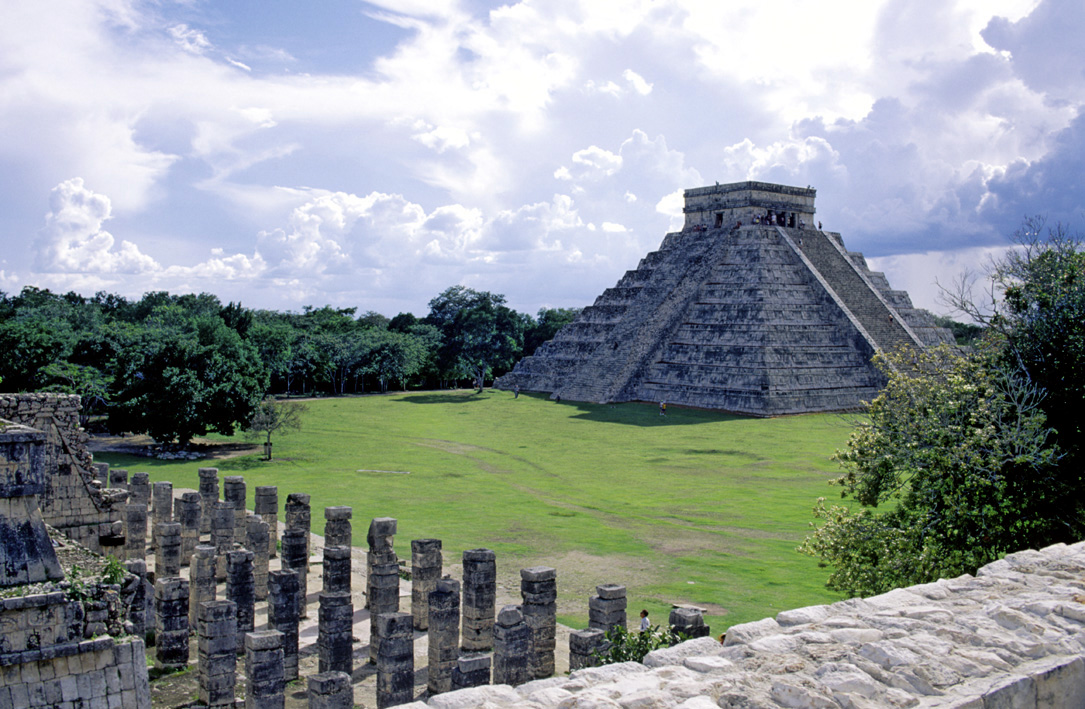
Chichen Itza ruins

The first settlements in what would become Chetumal were established by Palaeoindians before 8000 BC, during the Lithic period. The first permanent settlements in the area, though, are credited to Maya farmers newly arrived from the Maya Highlands by 2000 BC, during the Archaic to Preclassic period transition. The first complex polity encompassing said settlements is presumed to have been formed by AD 100, during the Preclassic.

The completion of the Classic collapse in the Maya Lowlands saw both the reformation of Classic polities and the rise of Chichen Itza to regional power. The collapse does not seem to have been catastrophic in the (future) territory of Chetumal. At least twenty-five settlements in the area are known to have survived, most likely by reorienting economic activity towards the Chichen Itza-driven coasting trade. There is, nonetheless, evidence of limited social upheaval.

Chichen Itza, established by Itza settlers in circa 750–800, was the most influential city-state in the northern lowlands until circa 1050–1100. It appears to have started a sustained, and successful, programme of conquest in circa 900, resulting in the formation or reformation of various polities, possibly or likely including Chetumal.

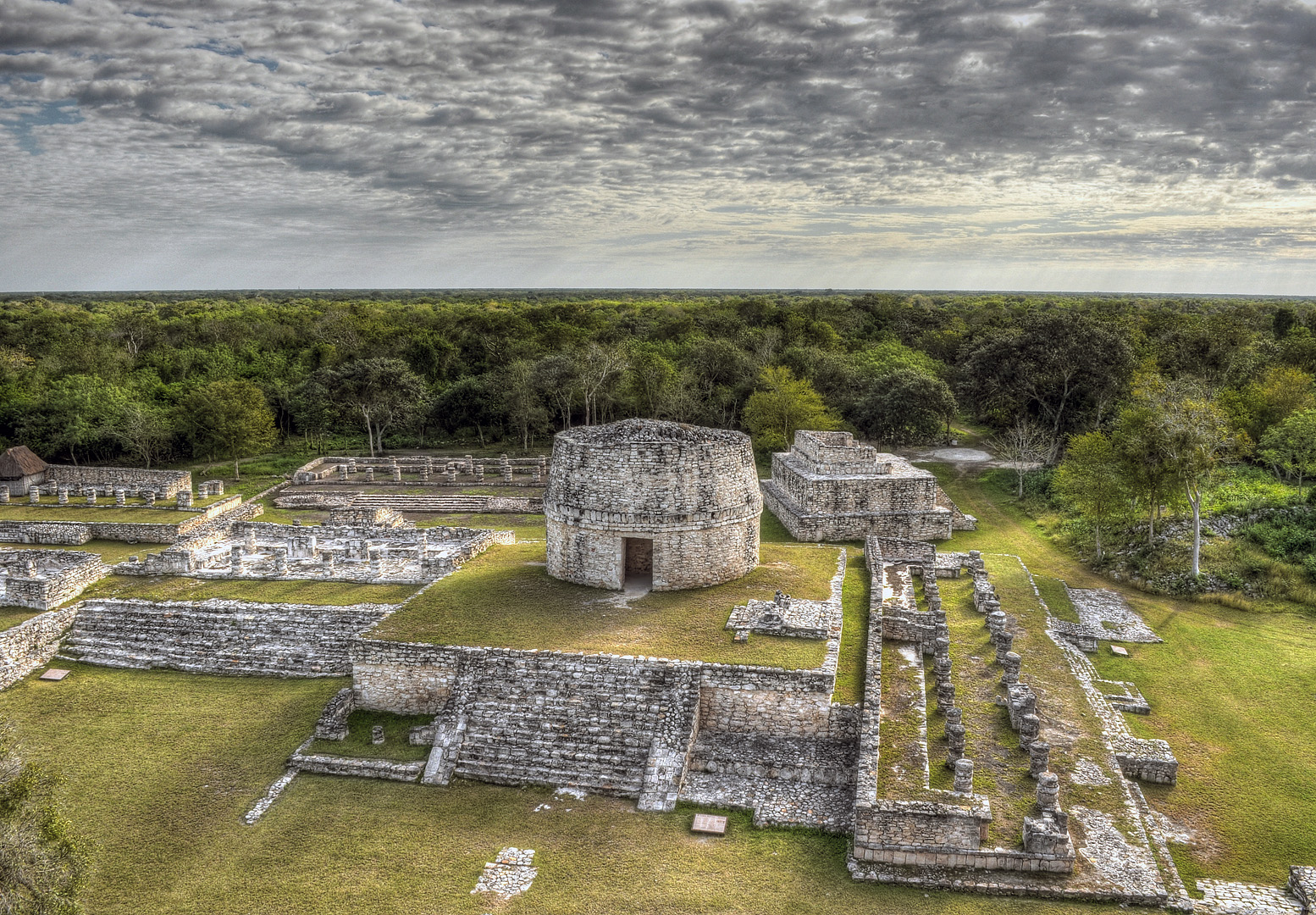
Mayapan ruins

Mayapan succeeded Chichen Itza as the regional power in the northern lowlands during k'atun 8 ahaw, equivalent either to 1080–1104 or to 1185–1204. Their rule lasted thirteen k'atuno'ob, thereby ending either during 1392–1416 or 1441–1461.

During circa 1450 to 1500, Pachimalahix I, fifth ruler of the Acalan, led a military force to the eponymous port and capital of Chetumal, and exacted tribute. Further details on this event remain obscure, though given the reputed commercial pre-eminence of said port at the time, it has been suggested that Pachimalahix I raided the city to settle trade-related damages, rather than actually having exacted tribute.

=== Columbian ===
The first non-Amerindian person known to have arrived in Chetumal was Gonzalo Guerrero, a Spanish sailor stranded off of Yucatan in 1511 or 1512. In 1514, Guerrero entered the civil or military service in Chetumal. He was likely gifted to Kan as a slave by a batab ('mayor') from the neighbouring Ekab province, a presumed ally of Chetumal. By 1519, Guerrero had fully assimilated to Maya culture, having married Kan's daughter and fathered three children with her. Guerrero would thereafter devise or at least contribute to the military strategy of Chetumal and allied states against at least three Spanish entradas.

Three events predating Guerrero's 1514 arrival have been proposed as marking first contact by Chetumal residents and non-Amerindian people: the said 1511 or 1512 stranding to Cozumel, the 1508 voyage by Pinzón and Solís to Lake Izabal, and the 1502 voyage by Columbus to Guanaxa. Maya settlements near Cozumel, Lake Izabal, and Guanaxa are known to have been part of the riverine and coastal trading networks of merchants in Chetumal. Any news of newcomers obtained by the former is thus presumed to have been passed on to the latter.

==== Spanish conquest ====
Hispano-Maya hostilities commenced on 5 March 1517 in Cape Catoche, when an expeditionary force led by Francisco Hernández de Córdoba was ambushed by Ekab's forces near that province's eponymous capital. Hernández and his men were similarly received by neighbouring Maya polities, thereby foiling the Spaniards' pecuniary aims.

The expeditionaries' reports of grand Maya cities would nonetheless spur further Cuban expeditions to Yucatan, including a 1518 trading and reconnoitering voyage by Juan de Grijalva and another in 1519 by Hernán Cortés, the latter of which quickly morphed into the 1519–1521 conquest of the Aztec Empire and a contemporaneous smallpox epidemic in the lowlands. The latter is presumed to have affected Chetumal severely. The reports likewise prompted Diego Velázquez de Cuéllar, the Cuban governor who had commissioned the Hernández expedition, to petition and be granted letters patent authorising his conquest of the Maya Lowlands on behalf of the Charles I of Spain. The newly minted adelantado, however, did not proceed with the conquest of Yucatan.

On 8 December 1526, the Salamancan conquistador Francisco de Montejo, who had participated in the aforementioned Grijalva and Cortés expeditions, was granted letters patent for the conquest of Yucatan and Cozumel by Charles I. Unlike Velázquez, former holder of the patent, the new adelantado did promptly undertake the called-for conquest.

His first expedition towards this end, with Alonso Dávila as his principal lieutenant, saw them land in Cozumel in late September 1527 with four ships and over 250 men from Seville. They were pretty successful in the northern lowlands (in Ekab and Chik'in Che'el), and so next proceeded via land and sea south to Chetumal in the summer of 1528. Their efforts here proved less successful though, as a ruse by the province soon convinced the men to retreat that same summer.

Montejo's second attempt came three summers later, led by his lieutenant, Dávila. With some fifty men, Dávila marched across the lowlands from the provincial capital of Kanpech east to Chetumal in mid-1531. They reached the now-deserted port capital that summer, where they were vigorously besieged by the province and neighbouring allies. The men thus made their retreat by sea in the autumn of 1532, reaching Puerto Caballos in spring 1533, after an arduous journey of seven months.

The next and final entrada came a decade later. Gaspar Pacheco, with some 25 to 30 conquistadors, marched south from Mérida in late 1543 or early 1544. This last expedition, notably one of the bloodiest of the Spanish conquest to date, proved successful, resulting in the dissolution of the province and incorporation of its (vastly depopulated) territory to Spanish Yucatan in 1544.

== Society ==
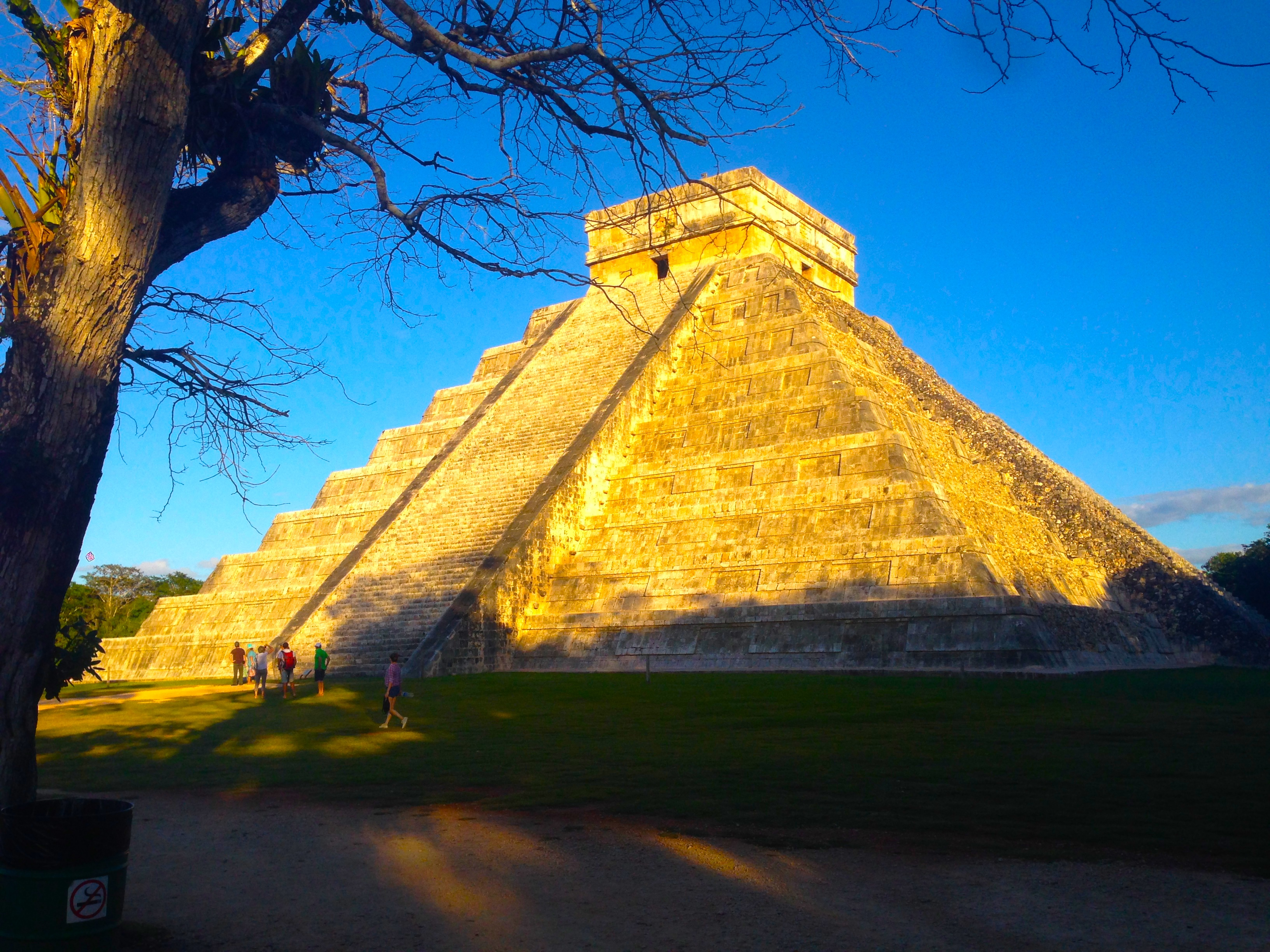
Chicken Itza temple dedicated to K'uk'ulkan

Chichen Itza is known to have (coercively) sponsored the pre-eminent worship of K'uk'ulkan. The cult of K'uk'ulkan is thought to have been the first state religion to transcend linguistic and ethnic differences in Mesoamerica. The cult is believed to have strengthened or been strengthened by the Postclassic coasting trade.

It has been suggested that Chetumal, in particular, was home to a cult of Itzamna which focussed on the god's association with large ocean creatures. He has featured prominently in material finds from former Chetumal which, unusually, frequently depict him emerging from the jaws of said creatures.

== Government ==
Chichen Itza is believed to have been governed either by a multepal ('council of lords'), or by a king and a privy council. It has been suggested that the city-state's realm was administered as a confederacy of provinces.

Mayapan is commonly held to have been ruled by a multepal ('council of lords'), composed of members from the Canul, Chel, Cocom, Cupul, and Xiu ch'ibalo'ob ('noble houses'). Its realm is believed to have been organised as a confederation of provinces, called the League of Mayapan, each of which was overseen by a kalwak ('governor').

=== Columbian ===
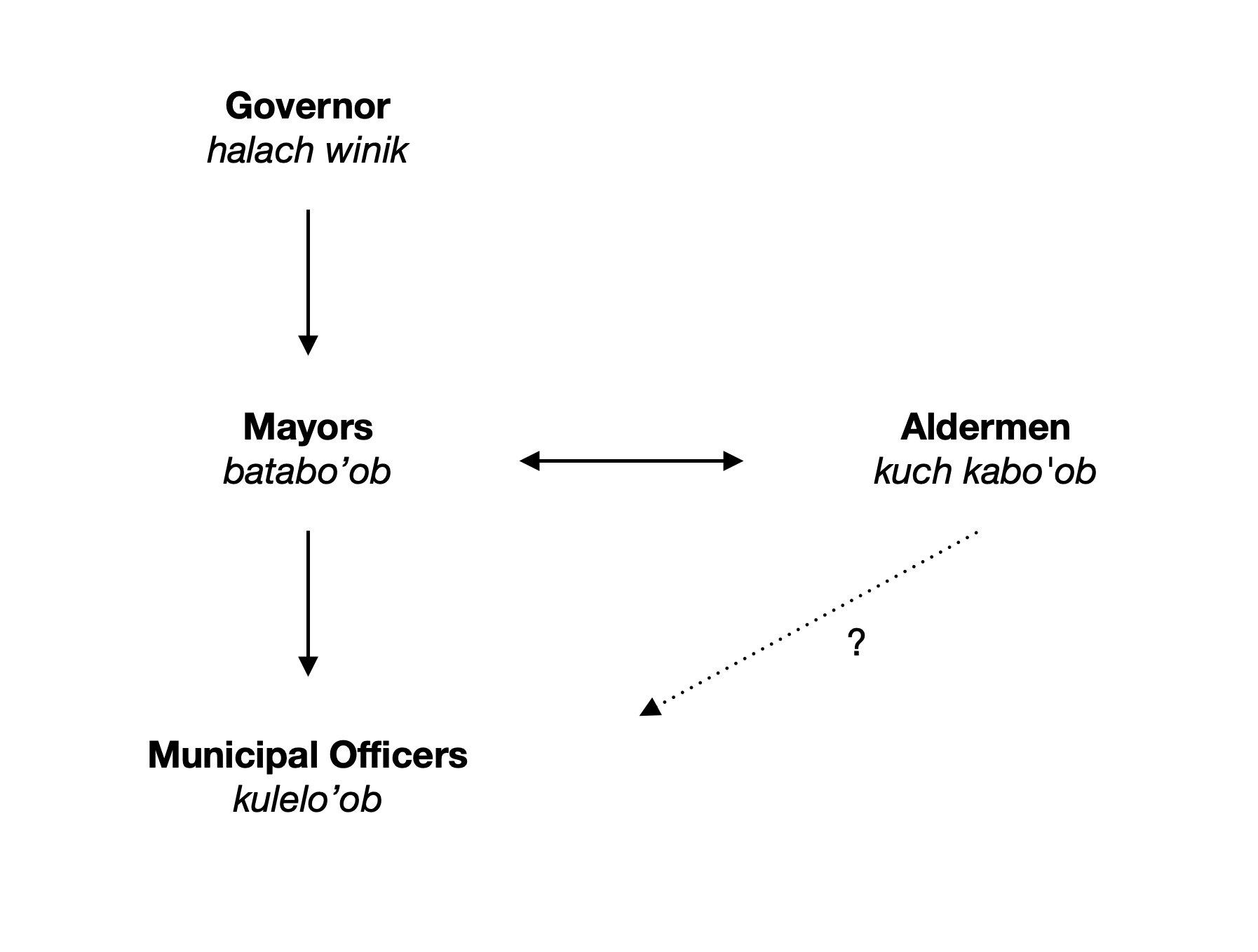
Civil organisation of Chetumal towards the Columbian era

Chetumal's form of government in and towards the Columbian era is presumed to have remained mostly the same as that during its infancy in the Postclassic, and to not have differed significantly from that of nearby unitary kuchkabals, like Kehpech, Mani, and Sotuta.

Chetumal's head of state and government was the halach winik ('governor'), who would also have been the batab ('mayor') of the province's eponymous capital. His office and title, Ahaw ('Lord'), were hereditary, and his rule considered a divine right. The office's powers and duties included: exacting tribute from the province's cities, towns or hamlets; conscripting men for military service in times of war; conducting war; sitting as the highest tribunal for inter-municipal conflicts; officiating religious ceremonies of state.

At least one of Chetumal's later governors is known to have held authority over some part or much of Waymil, the province's neighbour to the north. This was likely effected through the threat of force, rather than diplomacy, as said authority was only reluctantly acceded to.

Immediately subject to the governor were the batabo'ob ('mayors') of the cities, towns and hamlets of the province. This office was likewise hereditary. The office's powers and duties included: having a town farm kept for his pecuniary benefit, keeping houses and farms in order, sitting as a tribunal of original civil and criminal jurisdiction, and maintaining the municipal forces in times of peace.

The constitution of local government has not been fully elucidated. The following offices were nonetheless known to have been involved in at least some cities, towns or hamlets:

- nakomo'ob ('commanders-in-chief'), who exercised municipal military authority in the mayor's stead in times of war,
- kuch kabo'ob ('aldermen'), who severally exercised at least executive authority over kuchteelo'ob ('wards'), and who jointly, in court or council assembled, exercised veto power over at least some of the mayor's executive, judicial, or military decisions,
- kulelo'ob ('town officers'), who carried out the mayor's orders.

Local government were also responsible for administering the commons, which included all municipal land, as private land ownership either did not exist or was forbidden. It is not clear whether non-municipal land within the province was likewise held in common.

== Economy ==
At least since circa 1450, the provincial capital was a major port of call for the peninsular coasting trade from the Ulua River or Bay Islands up to the Ekab. It was, at least towards the Columbian era, a large town of circa 2,000 households, abutted by sapodilla and cacao orchards, maize fields, and apiaries of stingless honey bees. Its merchant class fully occupied one-fourths of Nito, an out-of-province port of call on the Dulce River. It traded the province's cacao, honey, wax, and marine products for obsidian, jade, turquoise, copper, and gold. Chetumal also had commercial links to the Ulua Valley of Honduras, and even sent a military expedition there when the Spanish began to jeopardize their business interests.

The province was the only significant cacao-producer in Yucatan. It provided the capital's merchants with cacao, honey, wax, and marine products. Articles for local consumption are thought to have included pottery from Lamanai and settlements on Honey Camp Lagoon, and salt and salted fish from coastal settlements on the Northern River Lagoon.

== Legacy ==
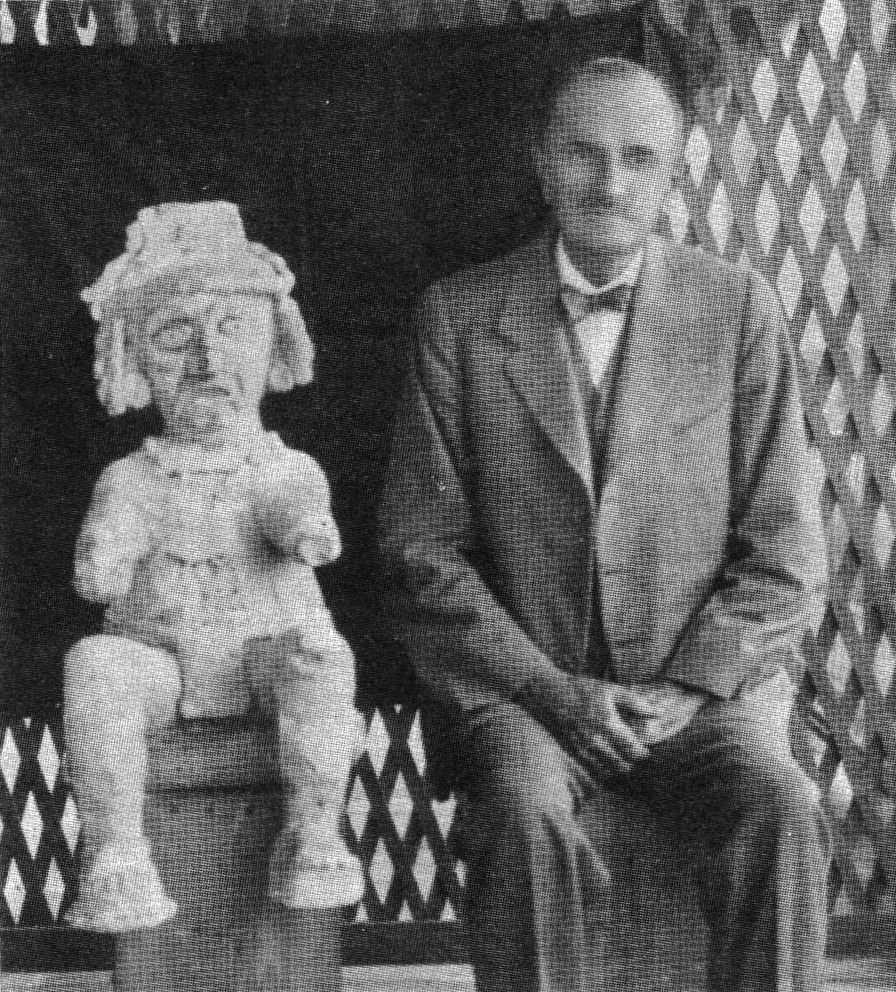
Portrait of Thomas Gann (right) in the 1920s

None of Chetumal's records are extant. Consequently, all scholarship on the province has relied on later Hispanic or Maya records and modern archaeology.

Archaeological work on Chetumal was begun in early 1894 by Thomas Gann, a medical officer of colonial Belize, in the ruins of Santa Rita, Corozal. His copious work spurred further explorations and excavations in Belize and Mexico by the University of Liverpool, British Museum, Carnegie Institution, Field Museum, J. E. S. Thompson, and Sylvanus Morley. He collaborated with Thompson on their 1931 History of the Maya, the first panoptic survey of Maya history for the general public. His collections of Maya artefacts remain in the British Museum, George Gustav Heye Center, National Museums Liverpool, and Middle American Research Institute, with the former receiving the first known collection of Maya jades. It has been suggested that his work prompted the first legislative protections for antiquities in colonial Belize in 1894, and their subsequent strengthening in 1897, 1924, and 1927.

After Gann, archaeological work on the province languished until the 1964–1970 Altun Ha Expedition of the Royal Ontario Museum. The project was pushed for by the Archaeological Commissioner of colonial Belize, A. H. Anderson, and led by David M. Pendergast. The substantial corpus generated quickly prompted a renaissance of archaeological work in the area, which has continued to the present day.

Historical work on Postclassic Maya polities was first published by the Mérida-based polymath Juan Francisco Molina Solís in 1896. This was followed by two works in 1943 and 1957 by Ralph L. Roys, a Mayanist of the Carnegie Institution. The latter of these (Political Geography of the Yucatan Maya) has become the authoritative text on the subject, and is most commonly cited as the first of its kind, being significantly more rigorous and complete than preceding works. Despite this progress, Chetumal remained one of the least elucidated provinces until the seminal 1989 Maya Resistance to Spanish Rule by Grant D. Jones, then a professor at Davidson College.

=== Social ===
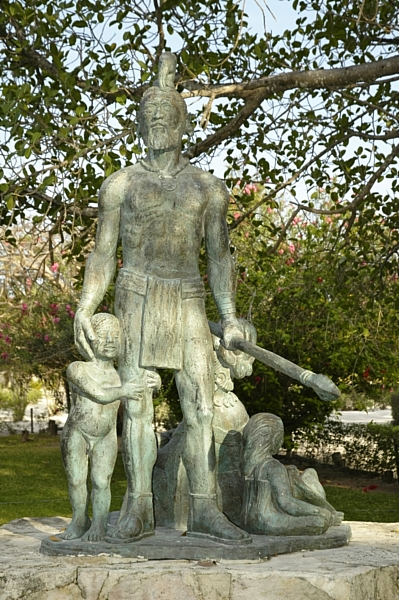
The Guerrero–Kan family by Raúl Ayala Arellano (one of dozens)

The modern city of Chetumal, Quintana Roo, founded on 5 May 1898 by Othón P. Blanco Núñez de Cáceres, was named after the former province or capital port.

The province's Guerrero–Kan family are widely believed to have been amongst the first Mestizo families in the New World. Numerous public works of art depicting them have been installed in Yucatan and Quintana Roo. A turtleshell statuette of Guerrero was gifted to Juan Carlos I and Queen Sofía of Spain during a royal visit on 16 November 1978 in Cancun. Quintana Roo's state anthem, adopted 14 January 1986, celebrates the Guerrero–Kan family. Othon P. Blanco's highest civic honour, introduced 29 September 1997, was named after Guerrero.

On 20 December 2012, the National Institute of Culture and History and the Belize Tourism Industry Association held a public re-enactment of the Guerrero-Kan wedding in Santa Rita, Corozal. Public re-enactments have since been held on 22 March 2014, 5 February 2015, 20 February 2016, 6 July 2017, 19 May 2018, and 29 March 2019.

== Notes and references ==
=== References ===
1. Adams, Richard E. W.; Macleod, Murdo J., eds. (1998). Mesoamerica. The Cambridge history of the native peoples of the Americas. Vol. 2 (1 ed.). Cambridge: Cambridge University Press. ISBN 0521652057.
2. Aimers, James J. (17 August 2007). "What Maya Collapse? Terminal Classic Variation in the Maya Lowlands". Journal of Archaeological Research. 15 (4): 329–377. doi:10.1007/s10814-007-9015-x. S2CID 145053177.
3. Anderson, A. H. (1963). Brief sketch of British Honduras. Belize: Printing Department.
4. Andrews, Anthony P. (1984). "The Political Geography of the Sixteenth Century Yucatan Maya: Comments and Revisions". Journal of Anthropological Research. 40 (4): 589–596. doi:10.1086/jar.40.4.3629799. JSTOR 3629799. S2CID 163743879.
5. Andrews, Anthony P.; Jones, Grant D. (2001). "Asentamientos coloniales en la costa de Quintana Roo". Temas Antropológicos. 23 (1). ISSN 1405-843X.
6. Arranz Márquez, Luis (2018). "Pedro de Ledesma". Diccionario Biográfico electrónico. Real Academia de la Historia.
7. Barrera Vásquez, Alfredo; Bastarrachea Manzano, Juan Ramón; Brito Sansores, William; Vermont Salas, Refugio; Dzul Góngora, David; Dzul Poot, Domingo, eds. (1980). Diccionario maya Cordemex : maya-español, español-maya (1st ed.). Merida: Ediciones Cordemex.
8. Barrett, Jason W.; Scherer, Andrew K. (January 2005). "STONES, BONES, AND CROWDED PLAZAS: Evidence for Terminal Classic Maya warfare at Colha, Belize". Ancient Mesoamerica. 16 (1): 101–118. doi:10.1017/S0956536105050091. S2CID 162998916.
9. Biar, Alexandra (27 November 2017). "Prehispanic Dugout Canoes in Mexico: A Typology Based on a Multidisciplinary Approach". Journal of Maritime Archaeology. 12 (3): 239–265. Bibcode:2017JMarA..12..239B. doi:10.1007/s11457-017-9188-5. S2CID 165221743.
10. Bullard, William R. Jr. (1965). Stratigraphic Excavations at San Estevan, Northern British Honduras. Royal Ontario Museum Art and Archaeology Division Occasional Paper. Vol. 9. Toronto: University of Toronto Press. OCLC 02687476.
11. Castells, F. de P. (1904). "The Ruins of Indian Church in British Honduras". American Antiquarian and Oriental Journal. 26 (1): 32–37.
12. Cioffi-Revilla, Claudio; Landman, Todd (December 1999). "Evolution of Maya Polities in the Ancient Mesoamerican System". International Studies Quarterly. 43 (4): 559–598. doi:10.1111/0020-8833.00137. JSTOR 3014022.
13. Chamberlain, Robert Stoner (1948). The conquest and colonization of Yucatan, 1517–1550. Carnegie Institution of Washington Publication. Vol. 582 (1st ed.). Washington, DC: Carnegie Institution of Washington. hdl:2027/txu.059173008409431.
14. Chase, Arlen F.; Rice, Prudence M., eds. (1985). The Lowland Maya Postclassic (1st ed.). Austin, TX: University of Texas Press. ISBN 0292746431.
15. Chase, Diane Z.; Chase, Arlen F. (August 1988). A postclassic perspective : excavations at the Maya site of Santa Rita Corozal, Belize. Monograph. Vol. 4. San Francisco, CA: Pre-Columbian Art Research Institute. OCLC 1097265592.
16. Cockrell, Bryan R.; Simmons, Scott E. (March–June 2017). "Recycling and Reconfiguring: Metalwork of Maya Communities at Lamanai and Tipu, Belize". Ancient Mesoamerica. 28 (1): 157–181. doi:10.1017/S0956536116000365. S2CID 164472012.
17. Demarest, Arthur A.; Rice, Prudence M.; Rice, Don S., eds. (2004). The Terminal Classic in the Maya Lowlands: Collapse, Transition and Transformation. Boulder, CO: University Press of Colorado. ISBN 0870817396.
18. Escalona Ramos, Alberto (1946). "Algunas ruinas prehispánicas en Quintana Roo". Boletín de la Sociedad Mexicana de Geografía y Estadística. 61 (3): 513–628. ISSN 0373-6148.
19. Farris, Nancy M. (1984). Maya society under colonial rule : the collective enterprise of survival (1st ed.). Princeton, NJ: Princeton University Press. ISBN 0691076685.
20. Franks, A. W. (1877). "Remarks on Stone Implements from Honduras". Journal of the Anthropological Institute of Great Britain and Ireland. 6: 37–40. doi:10.2307/2841243. hdl:2027/hvd.32044042253526. JSTOR 2841243.
21. Gann, Thomas W. F. (25 February 1897). "On the contents of some ancient mounds in Central America". Proceedings of the Society of Antiquaries of London. 2. 17: 308–317. hdl:2027/njp.32101077284147.
22. Gann, Thomas W. F. (January–June 1905). "The Ancient Monuments of Northern Honduras and the Adjacent Parts of Yucatan and Guatemala, the Former Civilisation in These Parts, and the Chief Characteristics of the Races Now Inhabiting Them; with an Account of a Visit to the Rio Grande Ruins". Journal of the Anthropological Institute of Great Britain and Ireland. 35: 103–112. doi:10.2307/2843120. JSTOR 2843120.
23. Gann, Thomas W. F. (1912). "Exploration Carried on in British Honduras during 1908–9". Annals of Archaeology and Anthropology. 4: 72–87. hdl:2027/coo.31924082052816.
24. Gann, Thomas W. F. (1914–1916). "Report on Some Excavations in British Honduras". Annals of Archaeology and Anthropology. 7: 28–42. hdl:2027/umn.319510007364852.
25. Gann, Thomas W. F. (1918). The Maya Indians of southern Yucatan and northern British Honduras. Smithsonian Institution Bureau of American Ethnology Bulletin. Vol. 64 (1st ed.). Washington, DC: Government Printing Office. OL 6621217M.
26. Gann, Thomas W. F. (1924). In an Unknown Land (1st ed.). London: Duckworth & Co. OCLC 771316288.
27. Gann, Thomas W. F.; Thompson, J. E. S. (1931). The history of the Maya : from the earliest times to the present day (1st ed.). London: Charles Scribner's Sons. OCLC 911759759.
28. García Bernal, Manuela Cristina (2018). "Francisco de Montejo". Diccionario Biográfico electrónico. Real Academia de la Historia.
29. García Cruzado, Eduardo, ed. (2011). Jornadas IV, V y VI (2008, 2009 y 2010). Actas de las Jornadas de Historia sobre el Descubrimiento de América. Vol. 2 (1st ed.). Palos de la Frontera: Universidad Internacional de Andalucía : Ayuntamiento de Palos de la Frontera. ISBN 9788479932114.
30. Gerhard, Peter (1979). The southeast frontier of New Spain (1st ed.). Princeton, NJ: Princeton University Press. ISBN 0691052735.
31. González Hernández, Cristina (2018). "Gonzalo Guerrero". Diccionario Biográfico electrónico. Real Academia de la Historia.
32. González Ochoa, José María (2018). "Alonso González Dávila". Diccionario Biográfico electrónico. Real Academia de la Historia.
33. González Vázquez, David Anuar (November 2018). LA EXPEDICIÓN CIENTÍFICA MEXICANA AL TERRITORIO DE QUINTANA ROO (1936-1938): PRÁCTICAS CIENTÍFICAS Y RELACIONES POLÍTICAS EN LA FORMACIÓN DEL ESTADO-NACIÓN (MA). Mexico City: Centro de Investigaciones y Estudios Superiores en Antropología Social.
34. Graham, Elizabeth A. (2011). Maya Christians and Their Churches in Sixteenth-Century Belize. Maya Studies (1st ed.). Gainesville, FL: University Press of Florida. ISBN 978-0813041834.
35. Guderjan, Thomas H. (March–June 1995). "Maya Settlement and Trade on Ambergris Caye, Belize". Ancient Mesoamerica. 6: 147–159. doi:10.1017/S0956536100002157. S2CID 163598928.
36. Haberland, Wolfgang (August 1958). "An Early Mound at Luisville, British Honduras". Man. 58: 128–129. doi:10.2307/2796273. JSTOR 2796273.
37. Hammond, Norman (March 1983). "The development of Belizean archaeology". Antiquity. 57 (219): 19–27. doi:10.1017/S0003598X00054946. S2CID 163374681.
38. Hammond, Norman (23 September 2004). "Gann, Thomas William Francis". Oxford Dictionary of National Biography (online ed.). Oxford University Press. doi:10.1093/ref:odnb/33319. (Subscription, Wikipedia Library access or UK public library membership required.)
39. Helmke, Christophe (September–December 2020). "Under the Lordly Monarchs of the North: The Epigraphy of Northern Belize". Ancient Mesoamerica. 31 (2): 261–286. doi:10.1017/S0956536119000348. S2CID 213203582.
40. Jakeman, M. Wells (May 1938). The Maya states of Yucatan, 1441-1545 (PhD). Berkeley, CA: University of California. OCLC 14464076.
41. Jones, Grant D. (1989). Maya resistance to Spanish rule : time and history on a colonial frontier (1st ed.). Albuquerque, NM: University of New Mexico Press. ISBN 082631161X.
42. Kelly, Thomas C. (September 1993). "Preceramic Projectile-Point Typology in Belize". Ancient Mesoamerica. 4 (2): 205–227. doi:10.1017/S0956536100000900. S2CID 161869542.
43. Lehmann, Christian (16 December 2018). "Ortografía". La lengua maya de Yucatán. Christian Lehmann.
44. López de Cogolludo, Diego (1957). Rubio Mañé, Jorge I. (ed.). Historia de Yucatán. Colección de grandes crónicas mexicanas. Vol. 3 (5th ed.). Mexico City: Editorial Academia Literaria. OCLC 9367712.
45. Masson, Marilyn A. (January 1999). "Postclassic Maya Ritual at Laguna de on Island, Belize". Ancient Mesoamerica. 10 (1): 51–68. doi:10.1017/S0956536199101068. S2CID 162417682.
46. Masson, Marilyn A. (2000). In the realm of Nachan Kan : Postclassic Maya archaeology at Laguna de On, Belize. Mesoamerican Worlds. Boulder, CO: University Press of Colorado. ISBN 0870815679.
47. Meissner, Nathan J. (September–December 2020). "THE POROUS BOUNDARY: COMPARING LATE POSTCLASSIC–EARLY COLONIAL MAYA PROJECTILE TECHNOLOGIES ACROSS PETEN AND BELIZE". Ancient Mesoamerica. 31 (3): 526–542. doi:10.1017/S0956536120000140. S2CID 229332603.
48. Milbrath, Susan; Peraza Lope, Carlos (January 2003). "REVISITING MAYAPAN: Mexico's last Maya capital". Ancient Mesoamerica. 14 (1): 1–46. doi:10.1017/S0956536103132178. S2CID 154673143.
49. Molina Solís, Juan Francisco (1896). Historia del descubrimiento y conquista de Yucatán, con una reseña de la historia antigua de esta península (1st ed.). Mérida de Yucatán: Impr. y lit. R. Caballero. OCLC 6955452. OL 23361775M.
50. Moody, Duane (6 February 2015). "Traditional Maya Wedding at Santa Rita". News 5. Great Belize Productions.
51. Moody, Duane (23 February 2016). "Traditional Mayan Culture Kept Alive in the North". News 5. Great Belize Productions.
52. Nielsen, Jasper; Andersen, Bente Jul (2004). "Collecting in Corozal : late Postclassic Maya Effigy Censers from Belize in the Danish National Museum (1860-1865)". Mayab. 17. ISSN 1130-6157.
53. Nunez, Dorian (21 December 2012a). "The Re-Enactment Of The Mayan Royal Wedding At Santa Rita". Ambergris Today.
54. Nunez, Dorian (27 December 2012b). Royal Maya Wedding Reenactment at Santa Rita Site Belize (Videotape). Ambergris Today.
55. Okashi Harada, Tsubasa; Izquierdo, Ana L.; Williams-Beck, Lorraine A., eds. (2006). Nuevas perspectivas sobre la geografía política de los mayas (1st ed.). Mexico City: Universidad Nacional Autónoma de México : Universidad Autónoma de Campeche : Foundation for the Advancement of Mesoamerican Studies. ISBN 9703232086.
56. Oxford University Press (2021). "Chetumal". UK English Dictionary. Lexico.com. Archived from the original on 27 July 2020.
57. Peissel, Michel (1963). The Lost World of Quintana Roo (1st ed.). New York: E. P. Dutton & Co. OCLC 871738735.
58. Pendergast, David M. (January 1968). "A. H. Anderson, 1901-1967". American Antiquity. 33 (1): 90–92. doi:10.1017/S0002731600090466. JSTOR 277776.
59. Pendergast, David M. (1979). Excavations at Altun Ha, Belize, 1964–1970. Vol. 1. Toronto: Royal Ontario Museum. ISBN 0888542194.
60. Pendergast, David M. (1982). Excavations at Altun Ha, Belize, 1964–1970. Vol. 2. Toronto: Royal Ontario Museum. ISBN 0888542909.
61. Pendergast, David M. (1990). Excavations at Altun Ha, Belize, 1964–1970. Vol. 3. Toronto: Royal Ontario Museum. ISBN 0888543557.
62. Pendergast, David M. (March 1993). "The Center and the Edge: Archaeology in Belize, 1809–1992". Journal of World Prehistory. 7 (1): 1–33. doi:10.1007/BF00978219. JSTOR 25800626. S2CID 161362847.
63. Powell, J. W. (1900). Nineteenth Annual Report of the Bureau of American Ethnology to the Secretary of the Smithsonian Institution 1897–98 in Two Parts—Part 2 (Report). Washington, DC: Government Printing Office.
64. Quezada, Sergio (1993). Pueblos y caciques yucatecos, 1550-1580 (1st ed.). Mexico City: Colegio de México. ISBN 968120395X.
65. Reichert, Rafal (1 June 2017). "El golfo de Honduras: estrategias geopolíticas y militares de una frontera imperial, siglos XVI-XVIII". Tzintzun. 65. ISSN 2007-963X.
66. Restall, Matthew (1997). The Maya world : Yucatec culture and society, 1550–1850 (1st ed.). Stanford, CA: Stanford University Press. ISBN 0804736588.
67. Rice, Prudence M. (2004). Maya Political Science : Time, Astrology, and the Cosmos. Linda Schele Series in Maya and Pre-Columbian Studies (1st ed.). Austin, TX: University of Texas Press. ISBN 0292702612.
68. Romero Mayo, Rafael I.; Benítez López, Jazmín (2014). "El proceso histórico de conformación de la antigua Payo Obispo (Hoy Chetumal) como espacio urbano fronterizo durante la etapa de Quintana Roo como territorio federal". Península. 9 (1). ISSN 1870-5766.
69. Rosenswig, Robert M.; Masson, Marilyn A. (2002). "Transformation of the Terminal Classic to Postclassic Architectural Landscape at Caye Coco, Belize". Ancient Mesoamerica. 13 (2): 213–235. doi:10.1017/S0956536102132123. JSTOR 26308205. S2CID 14142695.
70. Roys, Ralph L. (1943). The Indian background of colonial Yucatan. Carnegie Institution of Washington Publication. Vol. 548 (1st ed.). Washington, DC: Carnegie Institution of Washington. OCLC 26104478.
71. Roys, Ralph L. (1957). The Political Geography of the Yucatan Maya. Carnegie Institution of Washington Publication. Vol. 613 (1st ed.). Washington, DC: Carnegie Institution of Washington.
72. Sanders, William T. (1960). Prehistoric Ceramics and Settlement Patterns in Quintana Roo, Mexico : Contributions to American Anthropology and History No. 60. Carnegie Institution of Washington Publication. Vol. 606 (1st ed.). Washington, DC: Carnegie Institution of Washington. hdl:2027/uc1.31210024890640.
73. Scholes, France V.; Roys, Ralph L. (1968). The Maya Chontal Indians of Acalan-Tixchel: A Contribution to the History and Ethnography of the Yucatan Peninsula (2nd ed.). Norman, OK: University of Oklahoma Press. OL 22086001M.
74. Sebastian, Pablo (17 November 1978). "Los Reyes llegaron a Cancún (México)". El País.
75. Sharer, Robert J.; Traxler, Loa P., eds. (2006). The ancient Maya (6th ed.). Stanford, CA: Stanford University Press. ISBN 0804748160.
76. Shaw, Justine M.; Mathews, Jennifer P., eds. (2005). Quintana Roo archaeology. Tucson, AZ: University of Arizona Press. ISBN 0816524416.
77. Smith, Michael E.; Berdan, Frances F., eds. (2003). The postclassic Mesoamerican world (1st ed.). Salt Lake City, UT: University of Utah Press. ISBN 0874807344.
78. Smith, Michael E. (1 May 2005). "City Size in Late Postclassic Mesoamerica". Journal of Urban History. 31 (4): 403–434. doi:10.1177/0096144204274396. S2CID 145452272.
79. Society of Antiquaries of London (November 1870 – April 1873). "Thursday, March 2nd, 1871". Proceedings of the Society of Antiquaries of London. 5: 92–101. doi:10.1017/S0950797300011616. hdl:2027/hvd.hw2a3c.
80. Stemp, W. James; Awe, Jaime J.; Helmke, Christophe G. B. (7 April 2016). "A Possible Paleoindian/Early Archaic Point from Ladyville, Belize, Central America" (PDF). PaleoAmerica. 2 (1): 70–73. doi:10.1179/2055557115Y.0000000009. S2CID 130966757.
81. Thompson, J. E. S. (28 June 1975). "Thomas Gann in the Maya ruins". British Medical Journal. 2 (5973): 741–743. doi:10.1136/bmj.2.5973.741. PMC 1673974. PMID 1095123.
82. Varela Marcos, Jesús (2018a). "Juan Díaz de Solís". Diccionario Biográfico electrónico. Real Academia de la Historia.
83. Varela Marcos, Jesús (2018b). "Vicente Yáñez Pinzón". Diccionario Biográfico electrónico. Real Academia de la Historia.
84. Vazquez Barke, Gabriela (August 2012). BACALAR EN EL SIGLO XVII: colonización y resistencia (MA). Mexico City: Centro de Investigaciones y Estudios Superiores en Antropología Social.
85. Walker, Debra S., ed. (2016). Perspectives on the ancient Maya of Chetumal Bay. Maya Studies. Gainesville, FL: University Press of Florida. ISBN 9780813062792.
86. Wallace, Colin (May 2011). "Reconnecting Thomas Gann with British Interest in the Archaeology of Mesoamerica: An Aspect of the Development of Archaeology as a University Subject". Bulletin of the History of Archaeology. 21 (1): 23. doi:10.5334/bha.2113.
87. Wilson, Jan R. (2019). "Maya Weddings". Chactemal.com.
88. XVI Congreso de Quintana Roo (30 December 2015). LEY SOBRE LAS CARACTERÍSTICAS, DIFUSIÓN Y EJECUCIÓN DEL HIMNO A QUINTANA ROO (Report).
