= Cochuah =

Mayan province

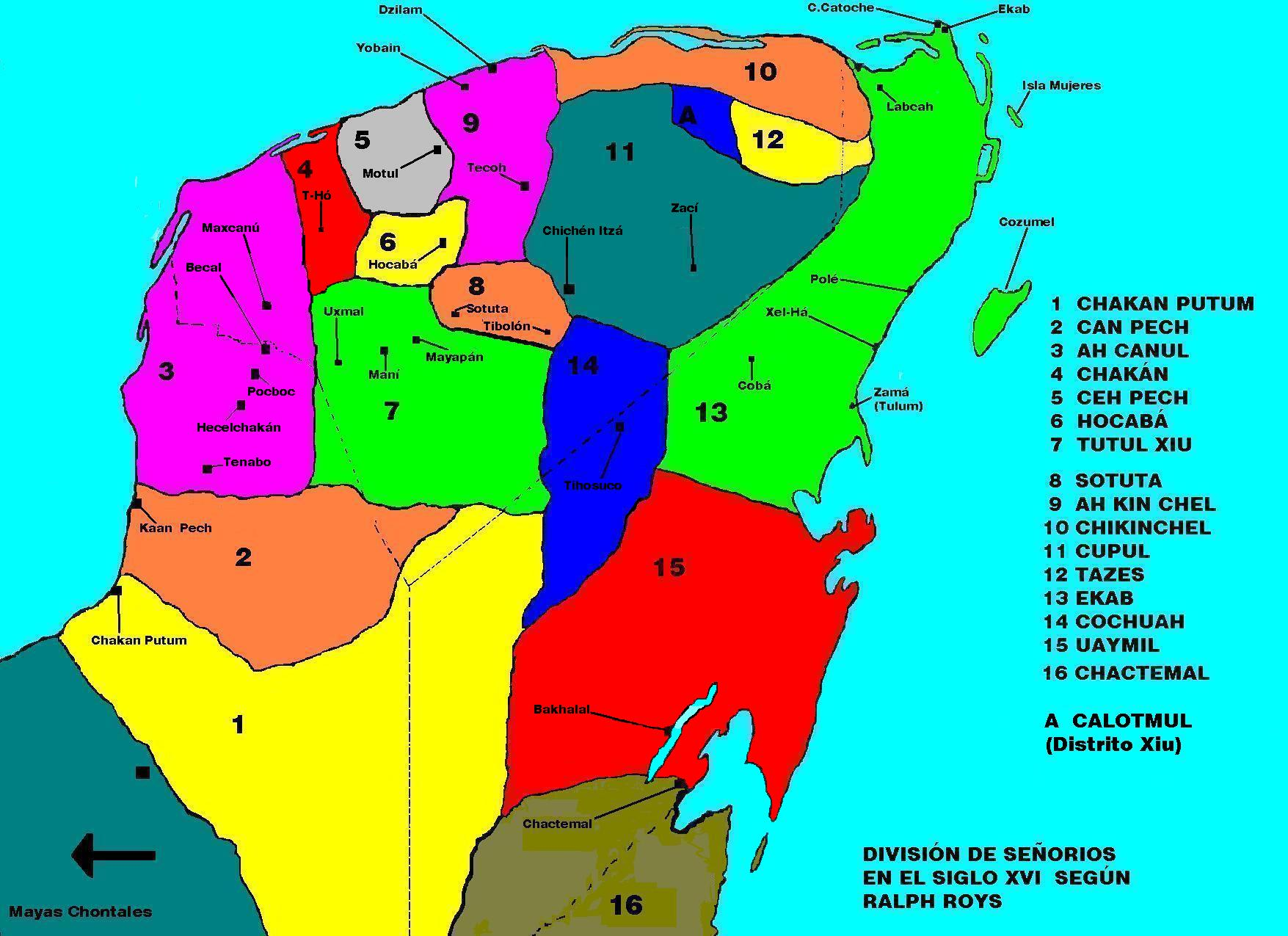
Chiefdoms of Yucatán: marked 14

Cochuah (also Kock Wah) (in the Mayan language: toponymic; K-: our + Och: food + Wah: bread. "Our food of bread"?) is the name of one of the sixteen Mayan provinces into which the central Yucatán Peninsula was divided at the time of the arrival of the Spanish conquistadors in the sixteenth century.

After the destruction of Mayapán (1441–1461), great rivalry between the Mayas started, and led to the formation of 16 independent jurisdictions called kuchkabal (in Mayan: province or region). In each kuchkabal there was a halach uinik (in Mayan: "real man"; "man in control") who was the chief with the biggest military, judicial and political authority, and who lived in the main city, considered to be the capital of the jurisdiction.

== Historical and territorial data ==
The cacicazgo bordered with Cupul in the north, with Sotuta, Tutul Xiu and Chakán Putún in the west, and with Ekab and Uaymil in the east, according to the map made by Ralph L. Roys.

Some authors, like Héctor Pérez Martínez in his notes for the seventh edition (1938) of The Report of the Affairs of Yucatan by Diego de Landa says that the capital of Cochuah was Tixhotzuc (Tihosuco), citing Juan Francisco Molina Solís. However, according to Yucatan at the Time, Chunhuhub seems to have been the main city, much closer to the province of Uaymil. Other than that city, to the east and the south extended great forests with little population up to the Bay of Ascension, which some writers consider formed part of the jurisdiction of Cochuah. It appears that the halach uinik of the region was Nakahum Cochuah who, in 1579, resided in Tihosuco, a fact which reinforces the thesis that that town was the true capital. The leader and his council had solid relations with the provinces of Cupul and Sotuta, and the three were united against the Spanish conquistadors.

Apart from Tihosuco and Chunhuhub, other important villages of the province were Tiholop, Tinum, Ichmul, and Chikindzonot. Recently, there has been archaeological work exploring Yo'okop, a site which appears to have had importance during the post-classical period and long after, in the 19th century as epicenter of the class war during which rebellious natives took refuge in this region of the Yucatán peninsula.

This region is located in the present José María Morelos Municipality in the state of Quintana Roo.

== See also ==
- Davila entrada – to this province in 1531
