= Belize Tourism Industry Association =

Largest tourism association in Belize

The Belize Tourism Industry Association (BTIA) is the largest tourism association in Belize. The organization was formed on April 26, 1985 and is governed by a Board of Directors and managed by a small secretariat.

BTIA advocates for issues that affect the tourism industry in Belize and provides a network and forum for addressing tourism related concerns.

On May 5, 2014, the BTIA filed a claim for judicial review in the Supreme Court of Belize against the Department of Environment on its decision to give the green light on Norwegian Cruise Line Harvest Caye Project.
