= Maya Lowlands =

Second-order subdivision of Mesoamerica

- Historical region
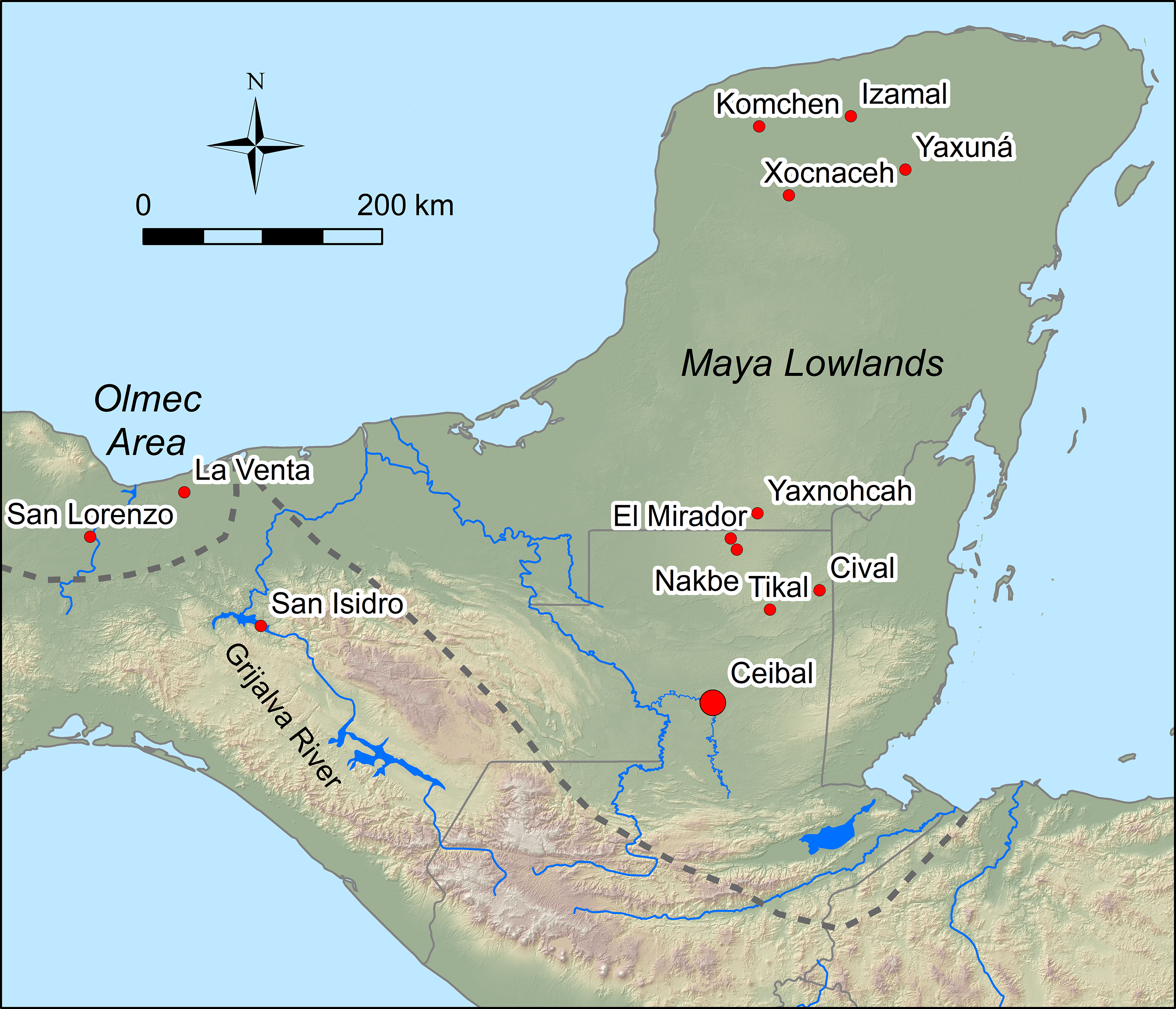
- The Maya Lowlands / prominent rivers and some settlements labelled / 2019 map by Inomata et al. / via PLOS

- Location within Mesoamerica
- Coordinates: 18°N 90°W
- Location: Belize, northern Guatemala, northwestern Honduras, southeastern Mexico
- Part of: Maya Region

Area
  - Total: 106,800 mi^{2} (277,000 km^{2})^{a}

Dimensions
  - Length: 460 mi (740 km)^{b}
  - Width: 400 mi (640 km)^{b}
- Highest elevation: 3,688 ft (1,124 m) (Doyle's Delight)
- Subdivisions: Northern; Central; Southern
- ^{a} cf (Note: As per Sharer & Traxler 2006, p. 24 within 100 mi^{2} (260 km^{2}) accuracy. Adams & Macleod 2000a, p. 201 demarcate the Lowlands to roughly 104,400 mi^{2} (270,000 km^{2}).)^{b} cf (Note: As per Sharer & Traxler 2006, p. 24 within 10 mi (16 km) accuracy. Adams & Macleod 2000b, p. 346 give length and width as 'more than' 404 mi (650 km) and 'about' 280 mi (450 km), respectively. Wallace 2020, p. 17 gives length and width as about 447 mi (719 km) and about 388 mi (624 km), respectively.)

The Maya Lowlands (Spanish: tierras bajas mayas) are the largest cultural and geographic, first order subdivision of the Maya Region, located in eastern Mesoamerica. (Note: The three commonly-given first-order sub-divisions of the Maya Region being, from north to south, the Lowlands, Highlands, and Pacific Coastal Plain (Sharer & Traxler 2006, pp. 24, 30). However, Adams & Macleod 2000a, p. 200 assert that the Maya Region 'has traditionally been divided into three major physical zones: the northern lowlands, southern lowlands, and highlands (including the Pacific slope); or in some schemes, northern, central and southern regions.')

== Extent ==
The Maya Lowlands are restricted by the Gulf of Mexico to the north, the Caribbean Sea to the east, and the Maya Highlands to the south and west. The precise northern and eastern limits of the Lowlands are widely agreed upon, being formed by conspicuous bodies of water. Their southern and western limits, however, are not precisely fixed, as these are restricted by 'subtle environmental changes or transitions from one zone [the Highlands] to another [the Lowlands],' rather than conspicuous geographic features. (Note: The transition from the Maya Highlands to the Lowlands has been described as 'gradual' (Sharer & Traxler 2006, p. 41). Rough demarcations are nonetheless attempted in literature. For instance, Wallace 2020, p. 16 fixes the southern and western limits as being just above (or on the foothills of) 'the volcanic mountain ranges of Guatemala and Chiapas.' Adams & Macleod 2000b, p. 346 fix them as a line (i) encompassing Cholan Mayan speakers (ii) running from eastern Tabasco, through eastern Chiapas, into Alta Verapaz, and up to northwestern Honduras.)

The Lowlands fully encompass Belize, the Guatemalan department of Peten, and the Mexican states of Campeche, Yucatán, and Quintana Roo. They may further partially encompass a number of northerly Guatemalan departments, northwesterly Honduran departments, and southeasterly Mexican states. (Note: For instance, the Lowlands as characterised by Adams & Macleod 2000b, p. 346 encompass 'eastern Tabasco, the lowland tropical forests of eastern Chiapas, [...] parts of Alta Verapaz, Guatemala, and [part of] northwestern Honduras.')

== Divisions ==
The Lowlands are usually subdivided either into northern and southern regions, or into northern, central, and southern regions. (Note: Some literature gives the Northern and Southern Lowlands as first order, rather than second order subdivisions of the Maya Region (Adams & Macleod 2000a, p. 200).) As with the Lowlands–Highlands border, the boundaries of the Lowlands' internal subdivisions are not precisely fixed, being rather formed by gradual environmental or climatic transitions. (Note: Rough demarcations are nonetheless attempted in literature. For instance, Wallace 2020, p. 16 (using only two internal subdivisions) fixes the North–South border as 'a roughly straight line between the Bay of Chetumal in the east and the Laguna de Terminos in the west.' Adams & Macleod 2000b, p. 352 (using the same sub-divisions) fix it as 'a line drawn from Champotón (formerly Chanputun) on the Gulf [of Mexico] Coast to the Bahía de la Ascención on the Caribbean [Sea].')

=== Northern ===
The Northern Lowlands are generally characterised by relatively low rainfall and high temperatures, typically ranging within 20–80 inches (510–2,030 mm) per annum and 77–95 °F (25–35 °C), respectively. Their rainy season typically lasts six or seven months during June–December, with a subsequent six- or five-month dry season. Their terrain is predominated by tropical forests in the south, gradually giving way to low bush-and-scrub forests in the north. Prominent bodies of water include Lake Bacalar and various cenotes. Prominent groupings of archaeological sites within the Northern Lowlands include the Northern Plains, the East Coast, the Puuc, and the Chenes sites.

The Northern Lowlands generally encompass portions of Campeche, Yucatán, and Quintana Roo in Mexico. (Note: In literature which only sub-divides the Maya Lowlands into northern and southern portions, omitting a central portion, the Northern Lowlands may further encompass portions of Peten in Guatemala, Campeche and Quintana Roo in Mexico, and Cayo, Belize [District], Orange Walk, and Corozal in Belize (eg as in Carrasco 2006, article 'Northern Maya Lowlands' para. 1).) Yucatán is remarkably known for its archaeological evidence of council houses, which date back to the early late classic period, usually depicted hosted by men, and discuss politics, warfare, power, and order.

=== Central ===
The Central Lowlands are generally characterised by relatively low rainfall and high temperatures, typically ranging about 80 inches (2,000 mm) per annum and 77–95 °F (25–35 °C), respectively. Their rainy season typically lasts eight-and-a-half months, from mid-May to January, with a subsequent dry season of three-and-a-half months, from February to mid-May. Their terrain is predominated by low east–west ridges of folded and faulted limestone, covered by tropical forests, grasslands, and wetlands. Prominent bodies of water include the Hondo, New, and Belize Rivers and their tributaries, and a roughly 910 square miles (2,400 km^{2}) drainage basin in central Peten housing some fourteen lakes, the largest of which is Lake Peten Itza. Prominent groupings of archaeological sites within the Central Lowlands include the Belize River Valley and the Central Peten Lakes.

The Central Lowlands generally encompass portions of Peten in Guatemala, Campeche and Quintana Roo in Mexico, and Cayo, Belize [District], Orange Walk, and Corozal in Belize. (Note: Some literature only sub-divides the Maya Lowlands into northern and southern portions, omitting a central portion (eg as in Carrasco 2006, article 'Mesoamerica' para. 6). Furthermore, some literature rather characterises the Central Lowlands as encompassing 'most of the Petén, Belize, and usually the Río Bec region of southern Campeche' (Carrasco 2006, article 'Northern Maya Lowlands' para. 1).)

=== Southern ===
The Southern Lowlands are generally characterised by relatively high rainfall and temperatures, typically ranging within 80–120 inches (2,000–3,000 mm) per annum and 77–95 °F (25–35 °C), respectively. Their rainy season ranges between nine and eleven months, with the dry season compressed to three months or fewer, with the latter typically occurring during March–May. (Note: Carrasco 2006, article 'Southern Maya Lowlands' para. 3 give the Southern Lowlands' wet season as occurring during late-May–November, implying a December–mid-May dry season, in contrast to the March–May dry season asserted by Sharer & Traxler 2006, p. 45. However, the extent of the Southern Lowlands as given by Carrasco 2006, article 'Southern Maya Lowlands' para. 1 differs from that given by Sharer & Traxler 2006, p. 24.) Their terrain ranges from broken karst topography, predominated by rain-forest and limestone formations, to low-lying coastal topography, predominated by swamps. Prominent bodies of water within the Southern Lowlands, which often feature relatively deep and fertile soils, include the Usumacinta River and its tributaries, the Sarstoon River, Lake Izabal, the Rio Dulce, the alluvial valley of the lower Motagua, and the Chamelecon and Ulua Rivers. Prominent groupings of archaeological sites within the Southern Lowlands include the Southern Belize Region. Additionally, locations like Nixtun-ch'ich, Yaxha, Ucanal, Chau Hiix, Jabonche, and Caye Coco show some influences from the northern lowlands, indicating migration and shared material culture, from architecture to ceramics.

The Southern Lowlands generally encompass portions of Chiapas, Tabasco, and Campeche in Mexico, Huehuetenango, El Quiche, Alta Verapaz, Izabal, and Peten in Guatemala, Cayo, Stann Creek, and Toledo in Belize, and Cortes, Santa Barbara, and Copan in Honduras. (Note: In literature which only sub-divides the Maya Lowlands into northern and southern portions, omitting a central portion, the Southern Lowlands may further encompass portions of Peten in Guatemala, Campeche and Quintana Roo in Mexico, and Cayo, Belize [District], Orange Walk, and Corozal in Belize (eg as in Carrasco 2006, article 'Southern Maya Lowlands' para. 1 and Carrasco 2006, article 'Northern Maya Lowlands' para. 1).)

== Geography ==
=== Physical ===
The Lowlands are generally characterised by elevations below 1,000–2,625 feet (305–800 m) and a hot, tropical climate. (Note: As opposed to a generally temperate or cold climate experienced in elevations above 2,625 feet (800 m) in the rest of the Maya Region (Sharer & Traxler 2006, p. 30). The Maya Mountains, commonly included within the Lowlands, nonetheless feature elevations above 2,625 feet (800 m) (Sharer & Traxler 2006, p. 46, Carrasco 2006, article 'Southern Maya Lowlands' para. 1).) They are predominantly covered by evergreen tropical forests, which tend to grow taller and denser in the southern Lowlands, given increased rainfall in this area, compared to the northern Lowlands, which experience relatively less rainfall. The climate of the eastern coasts is made relatively warmer and more humid by the Atlantic North Equatorial Current and the Gulf Stream.

=== Human ===
The Lowlands have been deemed the 'most central [subdivision of the Maya Region] to the story of Maya civilisation,' with tentative estimates placing the region's population in circa AD 800 at 2–10 million, and 17 of the largest 19 ancient Maya cities located in the region. (Note: Witschey & Brown 2010, 'Rank 1 Sites' map list the 19 largest ancient Maya cities as Copan and Kaminaljuyu (in the Maya Highlands), and Aguateca, Becan, Calakmul, Caracol, Chichen Itza, Coba, Comalcalco, Dos Pilas, El Mirador, Izamal, Palenque, Piedras Negras, Nakbe, Tiho, Tikal, Uxmal, and Yaxchilan (in the Lowlands).)

== Climate ==
The Lowlands are characterised by a hot, tropical climate, and are thus traditionally known as tierra caliente, 'hot earth,' in Spanish. The area experiences two seasons, wet and dry ones, with rainfall during the wet season usually peaking in June and October. Mean annual rainfall typically ranges within 20–120 inches (510–3,050 mm), with temperatures typically within 77–95 °F (25–35 °C).

Scholars have traditionally assumed that the Lowlands' present-day climate had 'always been the same, all through Maya prehistory and history,' but palaeoclimatic research has 'challenged this assumption, revealing far more climatic fluctuation than previously anticipated.' In particular, climate proxies from Quintana Rooan lakes and Belizean caves have provided 'a continuous record of climate changes for the Maya Lowlands extending over a period of 3,500 years.' These have revealed, for instance, particularly severe or prolonged droughts during AD 200–300, 420, 820–870, 930, and 1020–1100, some of which are thought to have played a part in the collapse of various ancient cities.

== Geology ==
=== Morphology ===
==== Provinces ====
The Lowlands are thought to fully or partially encompass at least eleven geologic provinces. (Note: Alternative divisions of the Lowlands into geologic provinces have been offered, for instance, by Bundschuh & Alvarado 2012, p. 77, fig. 3.1.) Notably, the northern and central Lowlands 'encompass the most extensive karstlands of the North American continent' i.e. the Yucatán Platform.

Geologic provinces within the Maya Lowlands per 21st century literature. (Note: USGS No. is the unique USGS province number as per French & Schenk 2004 and French & Schenk 2006.)
USGS No.	Name	Location	Notes
5308	Yucatán Platform	northern Lowlands	–
6117	Greater Antilles Deformed Belt	offshore Lowlands	–
6120	Cayman Trough	southern Lowlands	–
6125	Maya Mountains	central Lowlands	–
5305	Villahermosa Uplift	western Lowlands	–
5306	Macuspana Basin	western Lowlands	–
5304	Saline–Comalcalco Basin	western Lowlands	–
5302	Veracruz Basin	western Lowlands	–
5303	Tuxla Uplift	western Lowlands	–
5311	Chiapas Massif	western Lowlands	–
5310	Sierra Madre de Chiapas–Peten Foldbelt	southern Lowlands	–

==== Basins ====
The Lowlands are believed to fully or partially comprehend at least four sedimentary basins.

Sedimentary basins within the Maya Lowlands per 21st century literature. (Note: Evenick ID is the unique basin identifier ie UBI as per Evenick 2021, app. A supp. no. 1.)
Evenick ID	Name	Location	Notes
119	Campeche	northern Lowlands	–
519	Peten–Corozal	central Lowlands	–
757	Yucatán	northern Lowlands	–
647	Sureste	western Lowlands	–

=== Tectonics ===
The Lowlands lie wholly within the Maya Block of the North American Plate. They notably house the Ticul Fault to the north, the Rio Hondo, Yucatán Channel, and Maya Mountain Faults to the east, and a portion of the Motagua–Polochic Fault Zone to the south.

=== Stratigraphy ===
In the northern and central Lowlands, encompassed within the Yucatán Platform, mean crustal thickness increases from 12–16 miles (20–25 km) in the north to 19–25 miles (30–40 km) in the south. These portions of the Lowlands are blanketed by a carbonate sedimentary cover reaching a mean thickness of up to some 4 miles (6 km).

== Notes and references ==
=== Full citations ===
==== Print ====
1. Adams, Richard E. W.; Macleod, Murdo J., eds. (2000a). Mesoamerica, Part 1. The Cambridge history of the native peoples of the Americas. Vol. 2. Cambridge: Cambridge University Press. doi:10.1017/CHOL9780521351652. ISBN 978-1-139-05377-8. S2CID 163512332.
2. Adams, Richard E. W.; Macleod, Murdo J., eds. (2000b). Mesoamerica, Part 2. The Cambridge history of the native peoples of the Americas. Vol. 2. Cambridge: Cambridge University Press. doi:10.1017/CHOL9780521652049. ISBN 978-1-139-05346-4.
3. Braswell, Geoffrey E., ed. (2022). 3,000 Years of War and Peace in the Maya Lowlands: Identity, Politics, and Violence. Routledge archaeology of the ancient Americas. London: Routledge. doi:10.4324/9781351268004. ISBN 978-1-351-26800-4. S2CID 246542762.
4. Bundschuh, Jochen; Alvarado, Guillermo E., eds. (2012) [2007]. Central America: Geology, Resources and Hazards (Reprint of 1st ed.). London: Taylor & Francis. doi:10.1201/9780203947043. ISBN 978-0-429-07437-0. OCLC 905983675.
5. Carrasco, Davíd, ed. (2006) [2001]. The Oxford Encyclopedia of Mesoamerican Cultures: The Civilisations of Mexico and Central America (Online reprint of 1st print ed.). Oxford: Oxford University Press. doi:10.1093/acref/9780195108156.001.0001. ISBN 978-0-19-518843-1.
6. Coe, Michael D.; Houston, Stephen D. (2015) [1966]. The Maya (9th ed.). New York: Thames & Hudson. OCLC 915597000.
7. Demarest, Arthur A., ed. (2007) [2004]. Ancient Maya: The rise and fall of a rainforest civilization. Case Studies in Early Societies (Reprint of 1st ed.). Cambridge: Cambridge University Press. OCLC 717693582. OL 3440009M.
8. Gómez-Pompa, Arturo; Allen, Michael F.; Fedick, Scott L.; Jiménez-Osornio, Juan J., eds. (2003). The Lowland Maya Area: Three Millennia at the Human-Wildland Interface. Binghamton, NY: Food Products Press. ISBN 1-56022-970-5. OCLC 50725221.
9. Nairn, Alan E. M.; Stehli, Francis G., eds. (1975). The Gulf of Mexico and the Caribbean. The Ocean Basins and Margins. Vol. 3. New York: Springer. doi:10.1007/978-1-4684-8535-6. ISBN 978-1-4684-8537-0.
10. Nichols, Deborah L.; Pool, Christopher A., eds. (2012). The Oxford Handbook of Mesoamerican Archaeology. Oxford Handbooks (1st ed.). Oxford: Oxford University Press. OCLC 1109248998.
11. Pohl, Mary DeLand, ed. (1990). Ancient Maya wetland agriculture: excavations on Albion Island, Northern Belize. Westview special studies in archaeological research. Boulder, CO: Westview Press. hdl:2027/txu.059173017866398. ISBN 0-8133-7202-X. OCLC 15421978.
12. Sharer, Robert J.; Traxler, Loa P., eds. (2006) [1946]. The Ancient Maya (6th ed.). Stanford, Calif.: Stanford University Press. hdl:2027/mdp.39015062626216. OCLC 57577446.
13. UISPP, ed. (2020). Different Times? : Archaeological and environmental data from intra-site and off-site sequences : proceedings of the XVIII UISPP World Congress (4-9 June 2018, Paris, France): Volume 4, Session II-8. Archaeopress archaeology. Oxford: Archaeopress Publishing. ISBN 978-1-78969-651-6. OCLC 1154813259.
14. Woods, Charles A.; Sergile, Florence E., eds. (2001) [First published 1989 in Gainesville, FL by Sandhill Crane Press]. Biogeography of the West Indies: patterns and perspectives (2nd revised ed.). Boca Raton, FL: CRC Press. ISBN 0-8493-2001-1. OCLC 46240352.

==== Journals ====
1. Beach, Tim; Luzzadder-Beach, Sheryl; Dunning, Nicholas; Jones, John; Lohse, Jon; Guderjan, Tom; Bozarth, Steve; Millspaugh, Sarah; Bhattacharya, Tripti (August 2009). "A review of human and natural changes in Maya Lowland wetlands over the Holocene". Quaternary Science Reviews. 28 (17–18): 1710–1724. Bibcode:2009QSRv...28.1710B. doi:10.1016/j.quascirev.2009.02.004.
2. Brenner, Mark (6 July 2022). "Classics revisited/from the archive Mayan Urbanism: Impact on a Tropical Karst Environment". Progress in Physical Geography: Earth and Environment. doi:10.1177/03091333221112360. S2CID 24238716.
3. Brenner, Mark; Rosenmeier, Michael F.; Hodell, David A.; Curtis, Jason H. (14 August 2002). "Paleolimnology of the Maya Lowlands: Long-term perspectives on interactions among climate, environment, and humans". Ancient Mesoamerica. 13 (1): 141–157. doi:10.1017/S0956536102131063. S2CID 62887180.
4. Evenick, J. C. (2021). "Glimpses into Earth's history using a revised global sedimentary basin map". Earth-Science Reviews. article no. 103564. 215 (sn) 103564. Bibcode:2021ESRv..21503564E. doi:10.1016/j.earscirev.2021.103564. S2CID 233950439.
5. Hoggarth, Julie A.; Restall, Matthew; Wood, James W.; Kennett, Douglas J. (February 2017). "Drought and Its Demographic Effects in the Maya Lowlands". Current Anthropology. 58 (1): 82–113. doi:10.1086/690046. S2CID 151904763.
6. Metcalfe, Sarah E.; Holmes, Jonathan A.; Jones, Matthew D.; Gonzalez, Roger Medina; Primmer, Nicholas J.; Martinez Dyrzo, Haydar; Davies, Sarah J.; Lenge, Melanie J. (15 April 2022). "Response of a low elevation carbonate lake in the Yucatan Peninsula (Mexico) to climatic and human forcings". Quaternary Science Reviews. 282: 1–18 of article no. 107445. Bibcode:2022QSRv..28207445M. doi:10.1016/j.quascirev.2022.107445. hdl:2160/60872eeb-b6f4-43ad-845f-e912dd25754a. S2CID 247514101.
7. Ross, C. H.; Stockli, D. F.; Rasmussen, C.; Gulick, S. P. S.; Graaff, S. J.; Claeys, P.; Zhao, J. (2021). "Evidence of Carboniferous arc magmatism preserved in the Chicxulub impact structure". Geological Society of America Bulletin. 134 (1–2): 241–260. doi:10.1130/B35831.1. hdl:10044/1/99016. S2CID 238043996.
8. Shrock, R. R. (1945). "Karst Features in Maya Region of Yucatan Peninsula, Mexico". Proceedings of the Indiana Academy of Science. 45: 111–116.
9. Wahl, David; Byrne, Roger; Schreiner, Thomas; Hansen, Richard (May 2006). "Holocene vegetation change in the northern Peten and its implications for Maya prehistory". Quaternary Research. 65 (3): 380–389. Bibcode:2006QuRes..65..380W. doi:10.1016/j.yqres.2005.10.004. S2CID 128976862.
10. Wahl, David; Byrne, Roger; Schreiner, Thomas; Hansen, Richard (September 2007). "Palaeolimnological evidence of late-Holocene settlement and abandonment in the Mirador Basin, Peten, Guatemala". The Holocene. 17 (6): 813–820. Bibcode:2007Holoc..17..813W. doi:10.1177/0959683607080522. S2CID 129244758. ProQuest 220526400.
11. Walsh, Megan K.; Prufer, Keith M.; Culleton, Brendan J.; Kennett, Douglas J. (20 January 2017). "A late Holocene paleoenvironmental reconstruction from Agua Caliente, southern Belize, linked to regional climate variability and cultural change at the Maya polity of Uxbenká". Quaternary Research. 82 (1): 38–50. doi:10.1016/j.yqres.2014.01.013. S2CID 128702315.

==== Other ====
1. French, C. D.; Schenk, C. J. (2004). "Map showing geology, oil and gas fields, and geologic provinces of the Caribbean Region". Open-File Report (Report). Open-File Report 97-470-K. Reston, Virg.: US Geological Survey. doi:10.3133/ofr97470K.
2. French, C. D.; Schenk, C. J. (2006). "Map showing geology, oil and gas fields, and geologic provinces of the Gulf of Mexico region". In French, Christopher D; Schenk, Christopher J (eds.). Open-File Report (Report). Open-File Report 97-470-L. Reston, Virg.: US Geological Survey. doi:10.3133/ofr97470L.
3. Kirst, K. Kris (14 December 2019). "Maya Lowlands". ThoughtCo. Archived from the original on 9 September 2022.
4. LACGeo (15 July 2020). "Maya Region: Maya Highlands and Lowlands (Mexico, Central America)". LAC Geographic. Archived from the original on 9 September 2022.
5. Martens, Uwe (2009). Geologic evolution of the Maya Block (southern edge of the North American plate): An example of terrane transferral and crustal recycling (PhD Thesis). Stanford University. ProQuest 304999167.
6. Wallace, Geoffrey H. (January 2020). The History and Geography of Beeswax Extraction in the Northern Maya Lowlands, 1540–1700 (PhD Thesis). McGill University. ProQuest 28266933.
7. Witschey, Walter R. T.; Brown, Clifford T. (2010). "Maps of the Maya Area". Electronic Atlas of Ancient Maya Sites. Archived from the original on 20 June 2010.
