= Uaymil =

Archaeological Site

Coordinates: 20.4549°N 90.4775°W

Uaymil is a pre-Columbian Maya archaeological site located on the Gulf Coast of northern Campeche. The settlement of Uaymil occupies a small island approximately 2.5 kilometers from the coast and 25 km north of Jaina. The site has been archaeologically investigated by Rafael Cobos, now of the Universidad Autónoma de Yucatán (UADY), who documented 15 structures, 8 of which were situated around a plaza containing an altar (Cobos 2001). A number of additional monuments and stele were also identified (Cobos et al. 2005).

Ceramic data recovered during archaeological excavation indicate that Uaymil was predominantly a Late to Terminal Classic site. Ceramic, lithic, and architectural data suggest that Uaymil had economic ties with both Uxmal and Chichén Itzá (Inurreta and Cobos 2003), but largely functioned as a port directly connected to, and dependent on, Uxmal (Cobos 2004).
