= Lake Bacalar =

Natural lake in Quintana Roo, Mexico

Laguna Bacalar
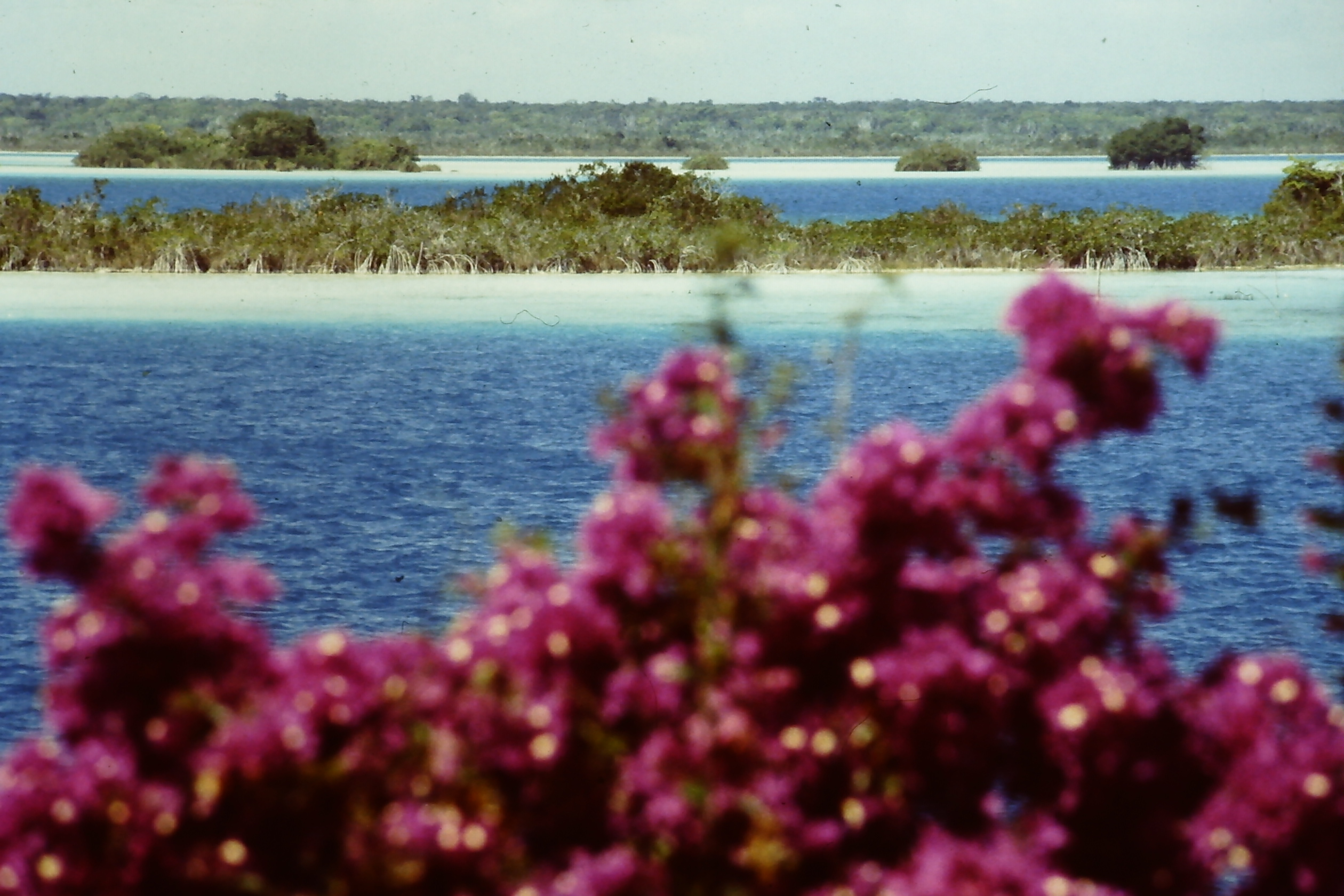
- View over the lake

- Location within Quintana Roo
- Location: Quintana Roo
- Coordinates: 18.750°N 88.315°W
- Type: Natural lake
- Primary inflows: (subterranean)
- Primary outflows: Mangrove surrounded river into the Rio Hondo
- Basin countries: Mexico
- Max. length: 60 km (37 mi) (north–south)
- Average depth: 15–18 m (49–59 ft)
- Max. depth: 55 m (180 ft) (in Cenote Negro)
- Surface elevation: 4 m (13 ft)
- Islands: more than 2
- Settlements: Bacalar

Lake Bacalar (or Laguna Bacalar) is a long, narrow freshwater lake in the state of Quintana Roo, Mexico near Mexico's border with Belize. It is approximately 60km long measured from north to south, and 2km at its widest. It is the second largest freshwater lake in Mexico behind Lake Chapala. The lake is renowned for its striking blue color and water clarity, partly the result of having a white limestone bottom. Like most bodies of water in the Yucatán peninsula, the lake is fed by underground rivers, whose regular open pools are cenotes. Because of the porous limestone, the Yucatán Peninsula has almost no lakes, this is by far the largest, and fed by the 450 km underground river that is part of the worlds's largest water cave/tunnel system, paralleling the coast.

It contains a huge population of the oldest life on the planet, the cauliflower-like stromatolites that only still exist in a few locations globally. On the lake's western shore is the village of Bacalar, population 11,084.

In November 2015, Mexico's federal environmental protection agency issued a pollution alert for Lake Bacalar as a result of illegal dumping and inadequate wastewater treatment.
