= Muzul territory =

Maya polity in Yucatan, dissolved 1690s

Coordinates: 17.228°N 88.432°W

- during 10th to 16th cent.–1690s
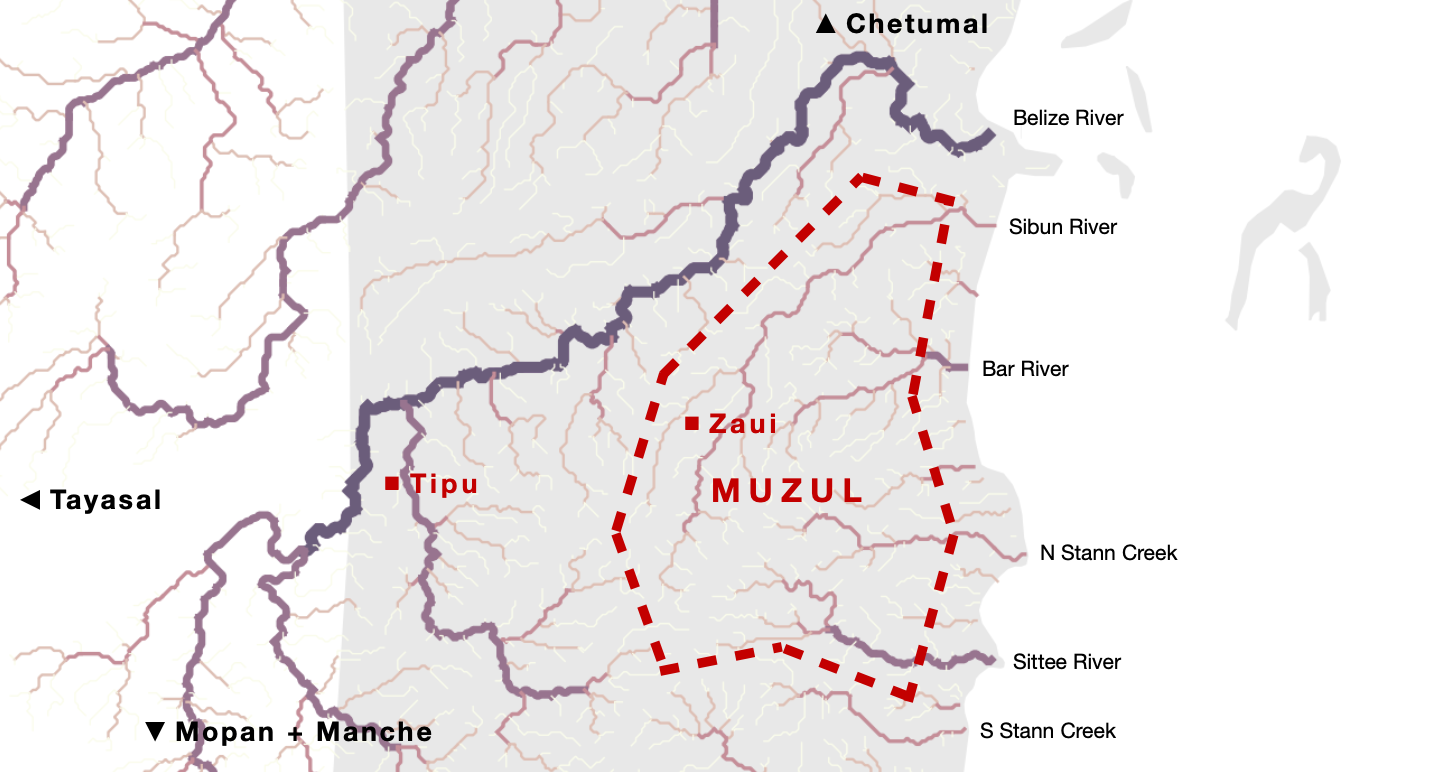
- Muzul territory's location (late 16th cent.)
- Status: Dissolved
- Capital: Zaui (Note: Also Zaqui. Possibly Saki, Saci.)
- Common languages: Mopan Maya
- Religion: Maya polytheism
- Government: Confederal kuchkabal
- Principal batab
  - c. 1677: Juan Muzul (last known)
- Historical era: Postclassic to Precolonial
  - Established: during 10th to 16th cent.
  - Disestablished: 1690s
Succeeded by
Bay settlement
- Today part of: Belize

The Muzul territory (Note: Also Muzul, Muzul Territory. Also Musul for Muzul.) was a Postclassic Maya polity (kuchkabal) in the southern Maya Lowlands, in what is now Belize. It is thought to have been established sometime during the Postclassic period, and to have been dissolved in the 1690s, during events leading to the Spanish conquest of Peten. Whilst both Spanish Yucatan and Spanish Peten claimed authority over the former territory, it was the Bay settlement which ultimately assumed control over it, thus forcing Spanish reducciones to extend to the 1750s. Its last known leader was Juan Muzul (Note: Also Juan Musul.) (fl. c. 1677), about whom little is known. Similarly little is known of the former polity or its people in Mayanist scholarship; it is likewise not noted in generalist literature nor popular culture. The territory is thought to have been subordinate to, or a proper part of, the larger Mopan territory.

== Geography ==
By the mid or late sixteenth century, the Muzul territory is thought to have lain east of Tipu, south of the middle Belize Valley, and north of South Stann Creek, thereby encompassing the drainage basins of the Sibun River, North Stann Creek, and the Sittee River. By the sixteenth century, its extent likely excluded the coast, making this an inland polity. Thus, the territory was situated south and east of the Dzuluinicob province, northeast of Mopan territory, and north of Manche Chol territory.

== History ==
It has been suggested that Tipu and its environs may have formed part of the Muzul territory until the early sixteenth century, when the Spanish conquest of Yucatan is thought to have driven troves of northern Yucatec Maya refugees to the area, an event which would have relegated pre-existing Muzul residents to minority status.

=== Columbian ===
Modern governor's residence in Merida, on the same site where Ursúa received the Muzul emissaries in 1695

By the late seventeenth century, the polity is thought to have come under the close political, cultural, or religious influence of the Peten Itza kingdom, their westerly neighbours. According to the historian Götz von Houwald, by this period the Muzul people were "a 'nation' intimately tied to the Itza", adding that in Spanish colonial accounts, the former are only ever mentioned in relation to the latter. Similarly, the Kan Ek' of said kingdom then reportedly "knew only, other than his own, the 'nations' of the Mopan people, of the Tipu people and of the Muzul people". Upon the 1697 fall of Tayasal, the (former) territory's batabs ('mayors'; caciques to the Spanish) were listed in Spanish records as amongst those who submitted to the (possibly presumed) authority of Martín Francisco Chan, nephew of the recently deposed Kan Ek'.

On 25 December 1695, an embassy from the yet-unconquered Peten Itza, and the recently-rebelled Tipu (formerly a visita mission of Spanish Yucatan), reached the governor of Spanish Yucatan, Martín de Ursúa, in Merida, offering their submission and allegiance. Two emissaries of the Muzul territory accompanied said embassy; they reportedly "came in the same submission, for themselves and in the name of all the other Indians of their nation, to render obedience". Ursúa accepted the embassy's offer, thus ostensibly bringing the represented polities under the dominion of Spanish Yucatan (at least nominally). However, the newfound Spanish Peten would soon contest Yucatan's authority in the now-former polity's territory, whilst the burgeoning Bay settlement had prior been (and would continue) encroaching on the same.

In the midst of such competing claims, the former Muzul territory (or its former residents) continued to act with some independence even after the 1690s. In 1707, Tipu (newly-submitted to Spanish authority) "was attacked by its disenchanted Muzul neighbours, who had killed the town's cacique, his lieutenant, and as many as fifteen principales ['principal inhabitants']". Spanish reducciones in the area, which began in 1695, extended to the 1710s, with residents forcibly resettled in Spanish Peten, near Lake Peten Itza in San Luis, Dolores, Santa Ana, San Andrés, San José, and Santo Toribio, in 1700–1713. The latest reducciones came in 1754–1756, possibly during a Spanish military campaign against the Bay settlement, when a residual population in Zoite (Note: Also Soite.) (on the Sittee) were relocated "in and around Santa Ana, San Luis and (a few) San Andrés".

== Society ==
Residents of the Muzul territory are thought to have been members of a single ch'ibal ('patronymic lineage group'), thus forming "a 'nation' stitched together by ties of tribal and familial kinship". As such, the territory formed "a highly localised group named after their dominant political family". The only known patriarch of said ch'ibal, and thus batab of Zaui and so the foremost or principal batab of the polity (cacique principal to the Spanish), was Juan Muzul, who in 1677 received the Dominican friar Joseph Delgado, who was travelling overland from some Manche Chol settlements to Tipu.

The Muzul people are thought to number amongst those referred to as indios del monte ('wild Indians') in Spanish colonial records, the latter being Maya people who lived beyond Spanish reach (south of the Belize River), still practised Maya polytheism, and spoke a Mayan tongue other than Yucatec. They are thought to have primarily spoken Mopan, and were sometimes conflated with Mopan people by the Spanish, leading scholars to suggest that the polity itself may have been a subdivision of the Mopan territory.

== Legacy ==
As of the 1980s, very little is presently known of the former Muzul territory or Muzul people. The latter are thought to number amongst the ancestors of the modern Mopan people of Belize and Guatemala, alongside residents of the former Mopan territory.

== Notes and references ==
=== References ===
1. Jones GD, ed. (1977). Anthropology and History in Yucatán. The Texas Pan American Series. Austin, Tex. and London: University of Texas Press. ISBN 0292703147. OL 18272858W.
2. Jones GD (1989). Maya Resistance to Spanish Rule: Time and History on a Colonial Frontier. Albuquerque, New Mex.: University of New Mexico Press. ISBN 082631161X. OL 2213175M.
3. Jones GD (1998). The Conquest of the Last Maya Kingdom. Stanford, Calif.: Stanford University Press. ISBN 0804733171.
4. Schwartz NB, ed. (1990). Forest Society: A Social History of Petén, Guatemala. The Ethnohistory Series. Philadelphia, Penn.: University of Pennsylvania Press. JSTOR stable/j.ctv4s7k6r.
5. Tanaka-McFarlane Y (August 2018). Documenting Belizean Mopan: An Exploration on the Role of Language Documentation and Renewal from Language Ideological, Affective, Ethnographic, and Discourse Perspectives (PhD thesis). Carbondale, Ill.: Southern Illinois University. OCLC 1077076621. ProQuest 10827467.
6. Thompson JE (1988) [first published 1972 by Benex Press]. The Maya of Belize: Historical Chapters Since Columbus (reprint of 1st ed.). Benque Viejo, Belize: Cubola Productions. ISBN 9686233032. OL 1792198M.
7. von Houwald G (1984). "Mapa y Descripción de la Montaña del Petén e Ytzá: Interpretación de un documento de los años poco después de la conquista de Tayasal". Indiana. 9: 255–278. doi:10.18441/ind.v9i0.255-271.
8. Wilk R, Chapin M (September 1988). Ethnic Minorities in Belize: Mopan, Kekchi, and Garifuna (Report). Washington, DC: US Agency for International Development. Doc ID PN-ABI-653. Archived from the original on 14 December 2024.
