= Spanish period of Belize =

Historical period in Belize, 1500–1638

Coordinates: 17.0°N 88.5°W

- 1500–1638
Postclassic	Precolonial
- Location: Belize
- Including: Conquest (to 1544); Post conquest (to 1638)
- Monarchs: Catholic Monarchs (first); Philip IV (last)
- Leaders: Melchor Pacheco (first); Julio Sanchez de Aguilar (last)
- Key events: Spanish conquest; Catholic prosyletisation; rise of piracy; Maya rebellion

The Spanish period of Belizean history began with the arrival of the Spanish in 1500, and ended with the Tipu rebellion in 1638. The period was marked by Spanish conquest and ensuing attempts at establishing political, economic, and religious authority, all of which succeeded to varying degrees, especially in northern Belize. Further trends included the rise of Elizabethan piracy in the 1570s, and of Maya resistance to Spanish rule in the 1600s. (Note: The Spanish period is variously dated in literature. See Periodisation of the history of Belize for further discussion. Some terms used in a historical sense, eg Bay of Honduras to mean the gulf bound by Cape Catoche and Cape Gracias a Dios (Reichert 2017, pp. 11, 13; Graham 2011, p. 112); Yucatan Peninsula to mean headland bound by Laguna de Terminos and Amatique Bay (Aliphat 2013, pp. 870–872; Restall 2019, p. 8). See § Glossary for unfamiliar words.)

== Geography ==
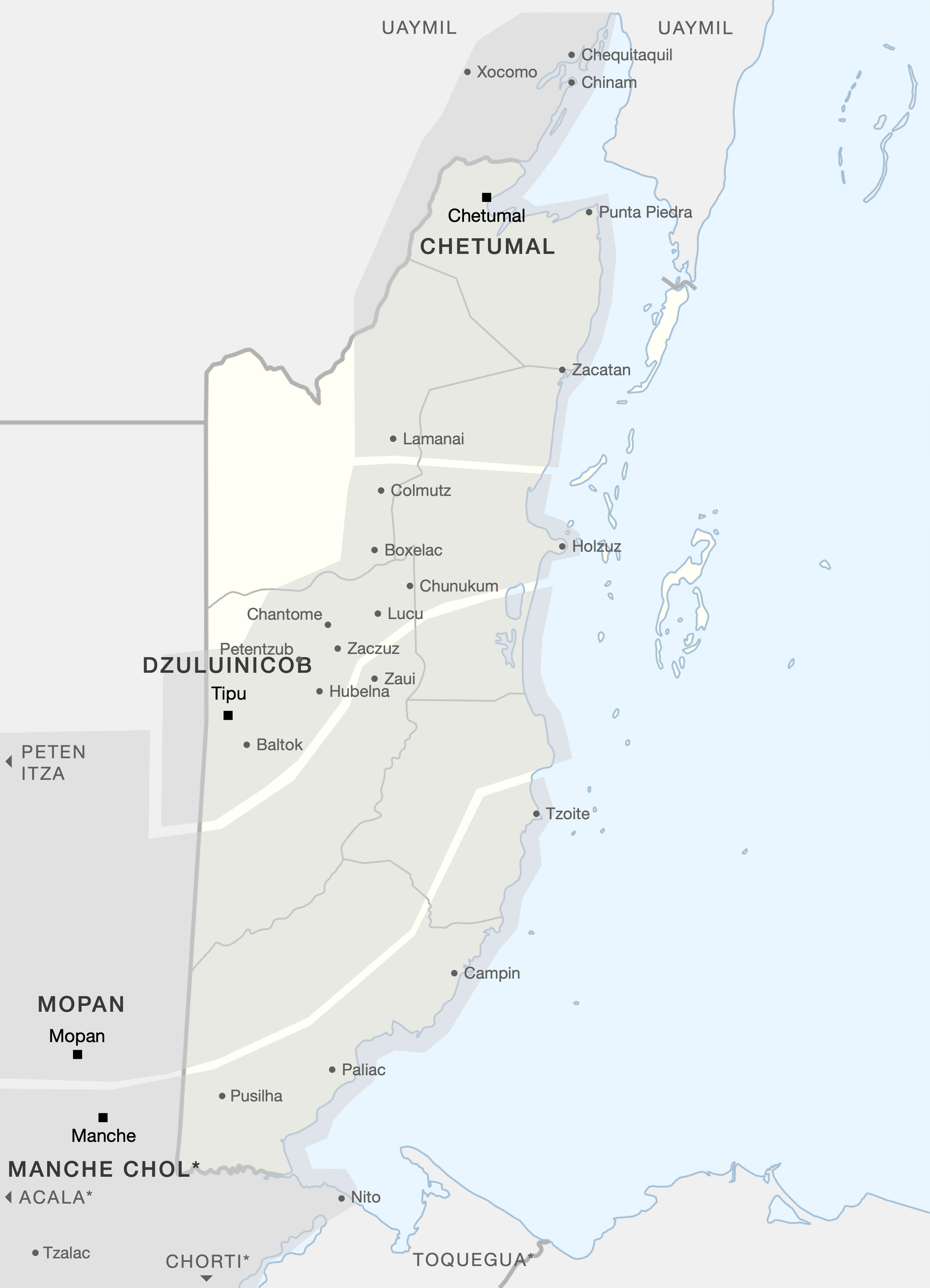
Political map of Belize prior to Spanish conquest / 2024 map based on Becquey, Feldman, Jones & Roys 1957–2012 / via Commons

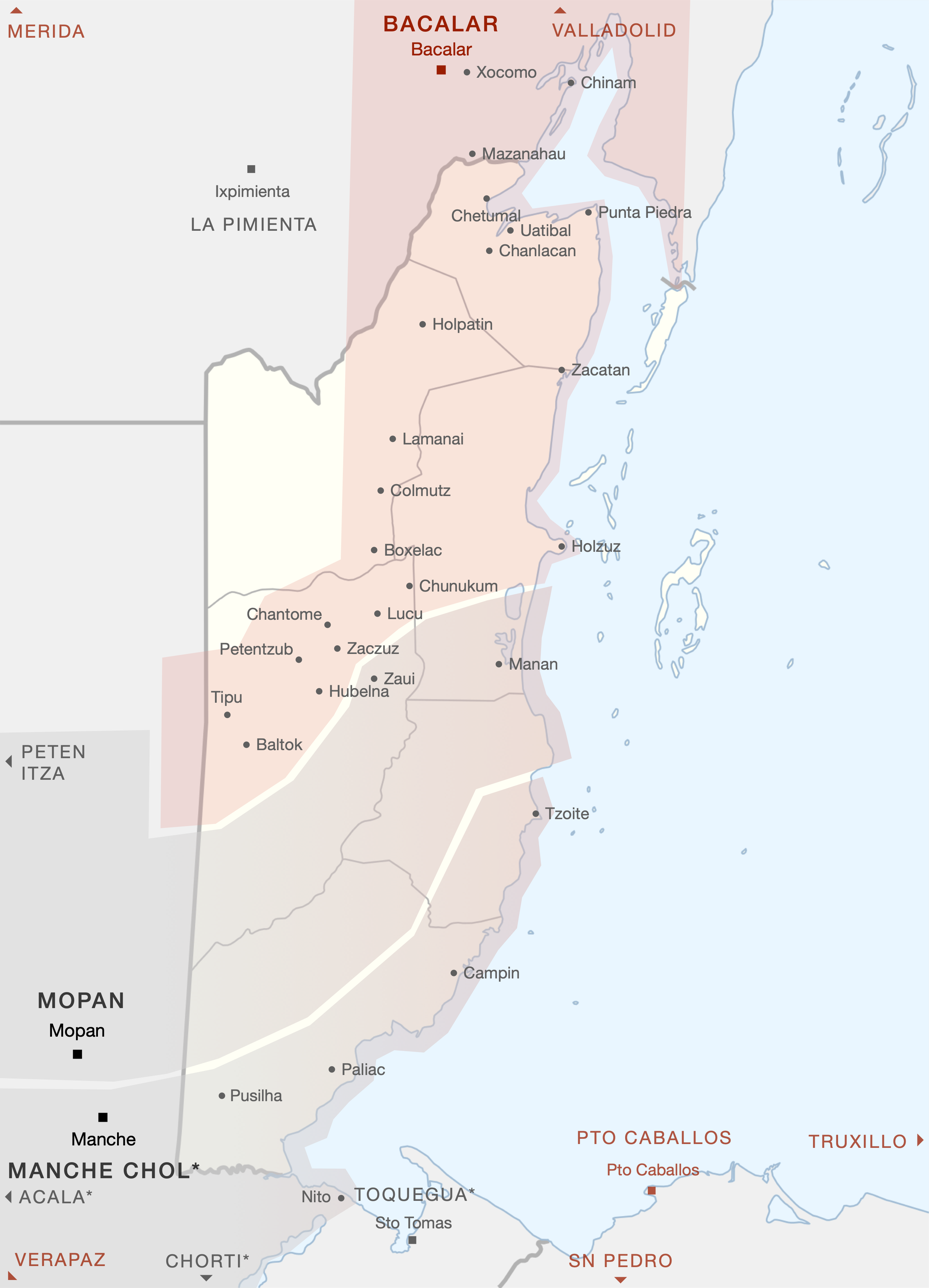
Political map of Belize after Spanish conquest / 2024 map based on Becquey, Feldman, Graham, Jones, Masne & Roys 1957–2012 / via Commons

At the start of the Spanish period, Belize, then part of the central and southern Maya Lowlands, is thought to have been split into at least two cultures (Yucatecan, Cholan) and four polities (Chetumal, Dzuluinicob, Mopan, Manche Chol). (Note: Becquey 2012, paras. 10, 19; Graham 2011, pp. 32–33, 108; Jones 1989, pp. xiv–xvii, 9–10, 94–99. With possibly a number of unorganised settlements, eg in cayes and western Orange Walk. Political geography of Belize prior to conquest 'still not known with certainty' though (Graham 2011, p. 29). Furthermore, polities may have been primarily organised as interpersonal networks, rather than 'a delimited space or place' (Graham 2011, pp. 30–34).)

Upon Spanish conquest, said polities came 'theoretically' under Yucatán's (and therefore New Spain's) jurisdiction. (Note: Masne 2011, para. 19, map 3; Restall 2019, p. 3; Graham 2011, pp. 110–113, 142.) Practically, however, the lower polities were further claimed by Verapaz (and therefore Guatemala), resulting in a grey zone of 'two poorly delimited colonial jurisdictions' that persisted into the Precolonial period. (Note: Masne 2011, para. 19, map 3; Graham 2011, pp. 111–112, 134–135. Lower Toledo possibly claimed by a Guatemalan province other than Verapaz, at least since 1570 (Graham 2011, p. 112). Notably, Yucatan and Guatemala contested the conquest of Peten (including Manche Chol territory) in the 1680s–1690s, with the latter winning secular and the former ecclesiastical jurisdiction in the end (Aliphat 2013, pp. 851–853, 865).)

== History ==
=== Conquest ===
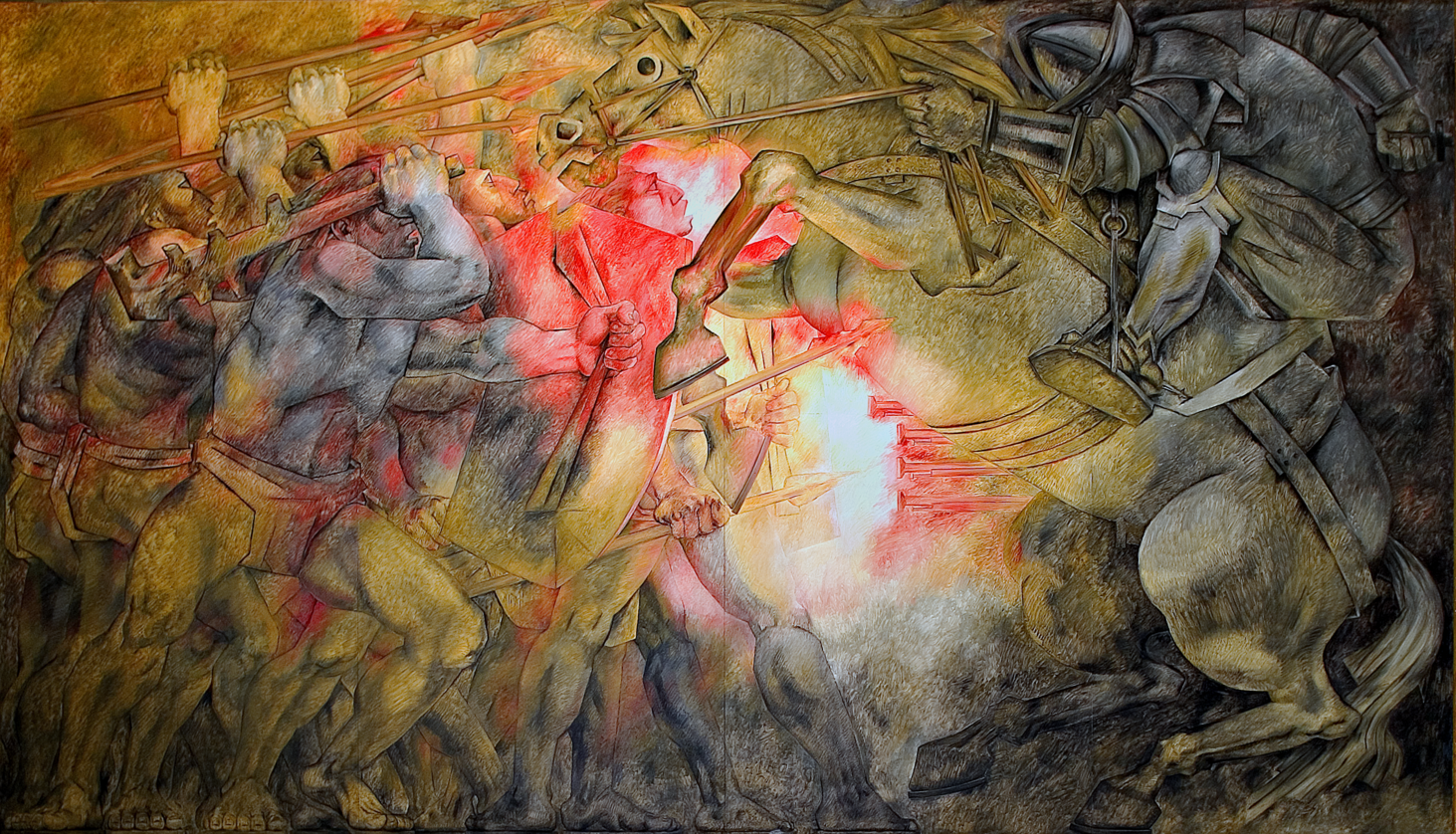
La conquista / 1970s mural by Castro Pacheco / via Commons

First contact with the Maya civilisation is ascribed to the 1502 Honduran leg of Columbus's fourth voyage, 1508–1509 Pinzon–Solis voyage, 1511 stranding of Guerrero, Aguilar, and company, or 1517 Hernandez de Cordoba expedition. (Note: Reichert 2017, pp. 13–15; Graham 2011, pp. 122–125; Jones 1989, pp. 26–27. In particular, the second is thought to have sailed up Belize's coast or reef, and the third to have set foot in the country by 1514 (Reichert 2017, p. 14). Other candidates possible, given likelihood of maritime voyages 'for which no records are preserved' (Graham 2011, p. 123).) News of these events is thought to have 'travelled rapidly' across the Maya region, trickling down through long-established trade routes, thereby giving even uncontacted polities prior notice of the Spanish. Belize's polities, in particular, 'almost certainly' heard tell of Columbus's 1502 landing, with Chetumal further benefitting from Guerrero's insider knowledge (said sailor having relocated or been relocated there from Ecab). (Note: Graham 2011, pp. 122, 124, 126–127; Jones 1989, p. 28.)

The first impact of conquest, even prior to its proper start in 1527, is thought to have been either epidemic disease, economic collapse, or impressment or enslavement. By the time the Spaniards arrived to conquer, they may have come upon 'a wary population and a hard-hit landscape.'

Conquest did not properly start, however, until the failed Montejo entrada of 1527–1528, which entered Chetumal by sea, and further intended to enter by land. (Note: Reichert 2017, pp. 18–19; Graham 2011, pp. 124–127; Jones 1989, pp. 26–28.) In 1528, Montejo decided they needed a more strategic location for their recently founded villa of Salamanca de Xelha. He set off due south in a brig, while his lieutenant, Davila, followed over land. (Note: Graham 2011, p. 126; Jones 1989, p. 26.) Montejo then entered the port of Chetumal (possibly Santa Rita). Its officials led him to believe that Davila had met an ill end, and so Montajo carried on his reconnaissance south. (Note: Graham 2011, pp. 126–127; Jones 1989, pp. 27–28.) Davila, meanwhile, was told that Montejo had met an ill end, leading him to turn back without reaching Chetumal. The manoeuvre afforded Chetumal, and lower polities, a brief respite from Spanish incursions.

The next entrada to Chetumal, Davila's of 1531–1533, likewise failed, but this time not so easily. (Note: Graham 2011, p. 128; Jones 1989, pp. 29–39.) Davila managed to actually take over the port in 1531, rechristening it Villa Real, though he was eventually routed in 1532. Chetumal and the lower polities 'were left to their own devices until late 1543 or 1544, when a most cruel conquest of the area bagan.'

The final entrada to Chetumal and lower polities, Melchor and Alonso Pacheco's of 1543–1544, is thought to have been particularly brutal, even for the time. (Note: Graham 2011, pp. 133, 153, 157; Jones 1989, pp. 41–45.) Their atrocities reportedly included the use of dogs, starvation, and mutilation. (Note: Graham 2011, p. 133; Jones 1989, pp. 42–43.) In the end, though, the Pachecos are thought to have conquered at least Chetumal and Dzuluinicob, founding their villa, Salamanca de Bacalar, by late 1544. (Note: Graham 2011, pp. 133, 157; Jones 1989, pp. 43–44. They were originally tasked with conquering territory 'as far south as the Golfo Dulce' (Graham 2011, p. 133).)

The work of conquest was still not done, however, as widespread revolts erupted in 1546–1547, including in Bacalar. (Note: Graham 2011, pp. 132–204; Jones 1989, pp. 17, 45–47.) Not until these were quelled could the Yucatán province 'be said to have been pacified.'

=== Post conquest ===
Bacalar soon found itself cut off from the rest of Yucatán, given 'poor roads [...] many of which remained impassable throughout the year,' and obstructed sea routes dotted by 'dangerous shallows and reefs,' resulting in the villa's protracted poverty, and a tenuous grip on northern Belize. (Note: Reichert 2017, pp. 20–21; Masne 2011, map 2; Graham 2011, pp. 111, 162–163, 207; Jones 1989, pp. 5–6, 11–12, 17, 52–53, 57–59, 64–66, 84. Notably, a royal officer in Merida wrote in 1620 of Bacalar– That villa is inhabited by the most miserable people in all the Indies, in a region so remote and poor that there is scarcely anyone who knows how to read and write, and where a mulatto, the son of an alcalde, was alcalde ordinario. And it is lucky that there is anyone who wants to inhabit that villa. — Jones 1989, pp. 55, 84.)

==== Catholic proselytisation ====
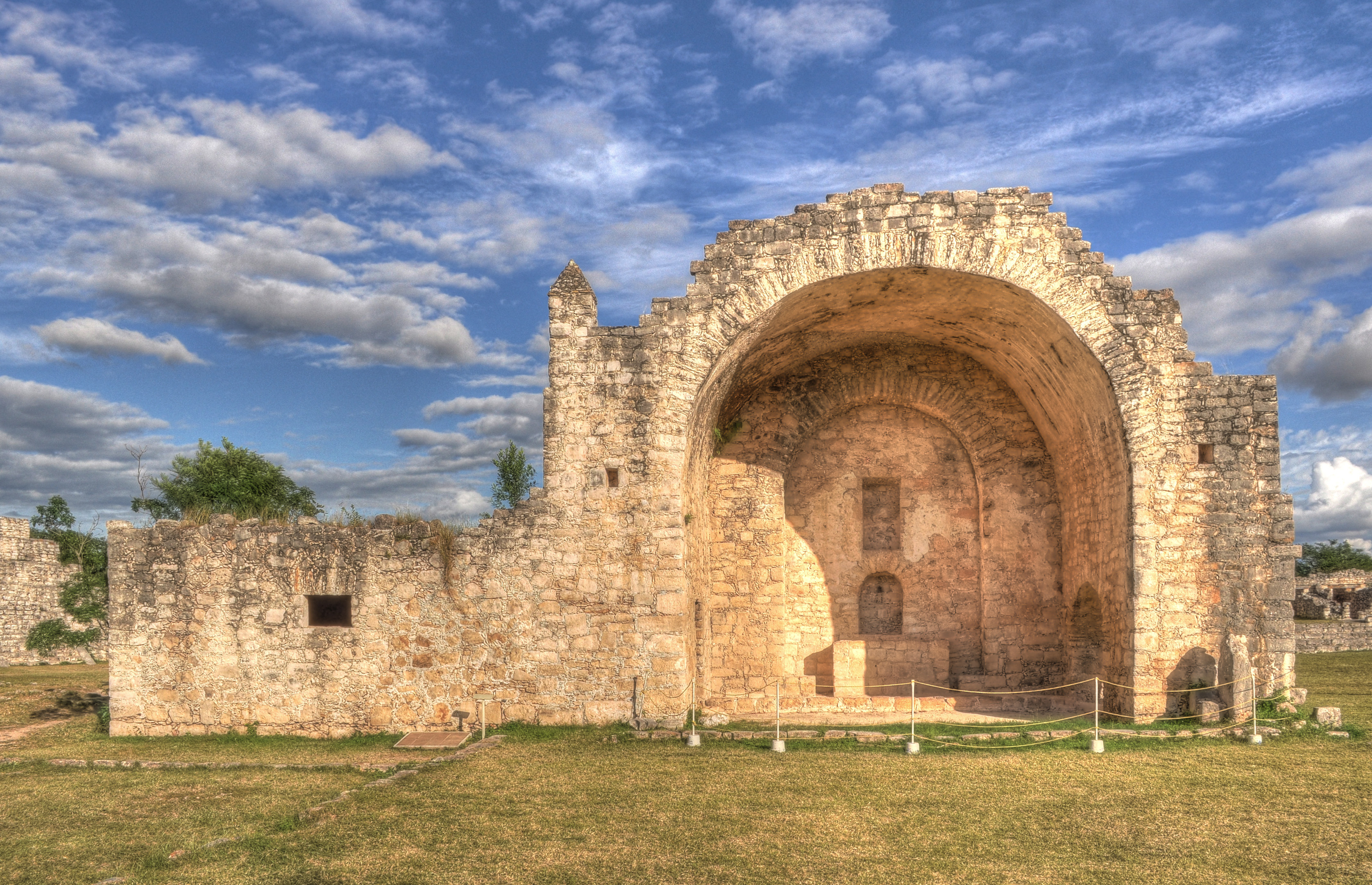
Ruins of Spanish mission church in Dzibilchaltun / 2010 photograph / via Commons

Missionary efforts are noted for having been 'militantly anti-pagan' (with paganism loosely defined), and for extending into temporal affairs (such as reduccions). (Note: Graham 2011, pp. 142–143, 150–151, 160, 162; Jones 1989, p. 52. Mendicants, in particular, are reputed as having generally 'planned towns, built churches, and governed and educated [mission] communities,' all of which 'came at the expense of indigenous ways of life, and did not reflect indigenous choice but instead Spanish ideas of what was good for the Indians' (Graham 2011, pp. 144–145). Franciscans, though, 'in general tried to keep Indian communities separate and protected from encomienda exploitation' (Graham 2011, p. 141). Bienvenida, for instance, complained to the Crown of the Pachecos' atrocities, and when the Maya of Bacalar district complained to Merida of their secular priests' behaviour, it was Franciscans who replaced them in 1617–1618 and 1641–1642 (Graham 2011, pp. 133, 158, 160; Jones 1989, p. 85).) Franciscan efforts (from Yucatán) are further deemed to have been assiduous, and to have extended 'as far south as Monkey River,' with Dominican work (from Verapaz) more periodic and restricted to southern Belize. (Note: Graham 2011, pp. 135, 138–139, 148, 162, 196; Jones 1989, pp. 100–101.)

Evangelising work may have begun upon Cortes's 1525 crossing of Mopan and Manche Chol territory, or Montejo's 1528 landing in Chetumal. (Note: Graham 2011, pp. 126, 131, 140, 157. Franciscan friars with Cortes are known to have preached in Peten Itza, to moderate success (Graham 2011, p. 157). Montejo's secular chaplain is likewise known to have proselytised enthusiastically (Graham 2011, pp. 126, 131, 140).) The earliest non-expeditionary friar in Belize is thought to have been the Franciscan Lorenzo de Bienvenida, who may have catechised independently as early as during the 1543–1544 Pachecos entrada, whilst en route from Golfo Dulce to Mérida. (Note: Graham 2011, pp. 159–160; Jones 1989, p. 60.) Bacalar itself may have had no resident clergy in its first two decades, though, as the earliest record of such dates to 1565 with the arrival of Pedro de la Costa, a secular priest. (Note: Graham 2011, pp. 142, 151; Jones 1989, p. 85.)

Lamanai and Tipu are known to have been visita missions, possibly as early as during the Pachecos entrada. (Note: Graham 2011, pp. 109, 195–197, 199, 204, 224, 236, 375; Jones 1989, p. 13.) They are thought to have been primarily serviced by Franciscans. A further number are thought to have been founded in northern and southern Belize. (Note: Graham 2011, pp. 195, 199; Jones 1989, p. 13.)

==== Piracy ====
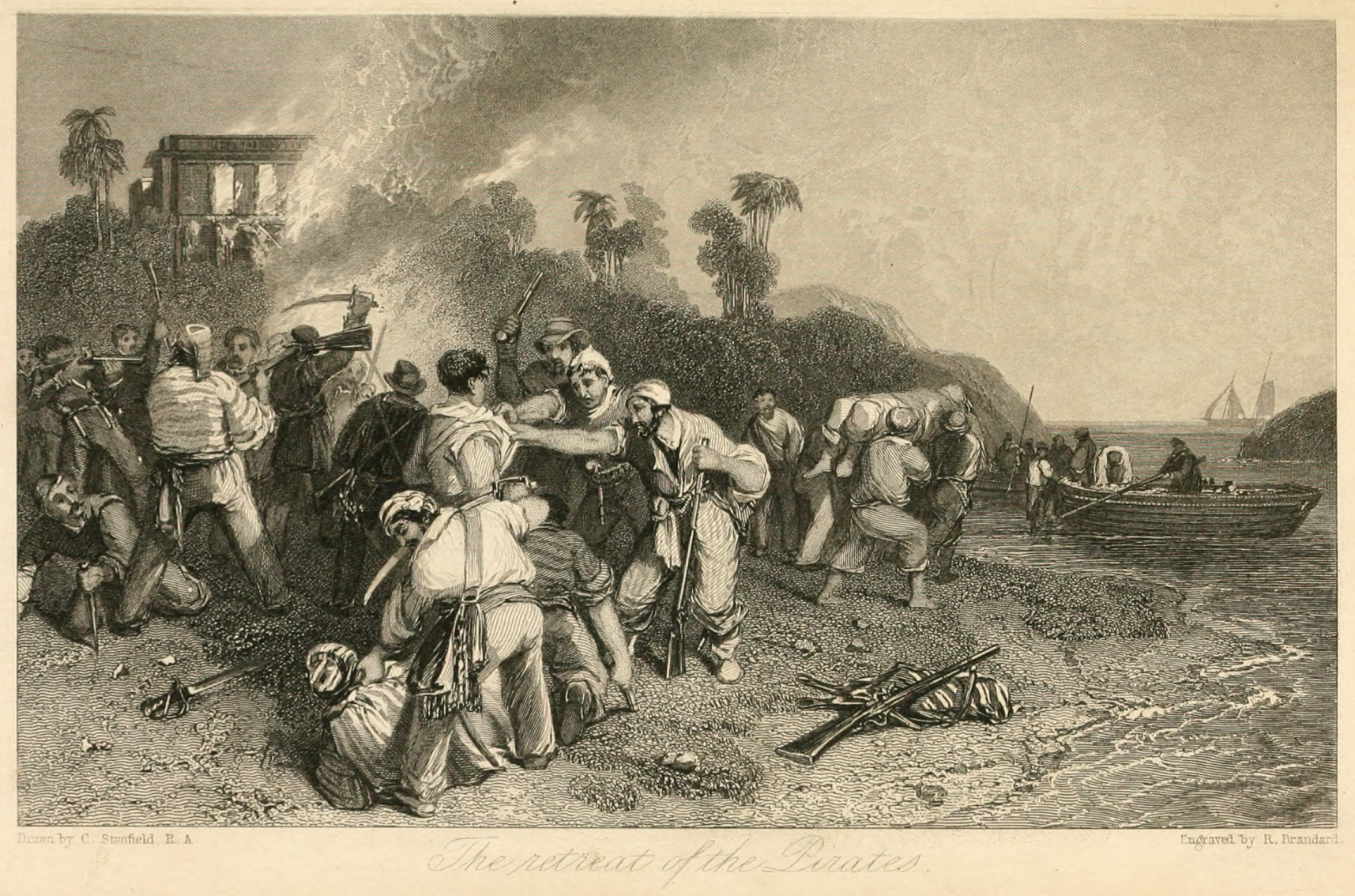
The Retreat of the Pirates / 1836 engraving by Stanfield / via HathiTrust

Piracy is thought to have been first introduced to the Bay of Honduras by Pedro Braques who, in a patax with 22 Frenchmen, had 'sailed to Honduras' and been apprehended in 1544. In 1558, their compatriots took Truxillo for the first time, followed by Puerto Caballos in 1559. (Note: Masne 2011, para. 27; Reichert 2017, p. 22.) The French were followed into the Bay by the Dutch and English, with the latter first arriving in 1572 or 1573. (Note: Masne 2011, para. 28; O 2020, p. 287.) The earliest known notice of piracy in Belizean waters is Francisco de Acles's raid of Bacalar in 1578.

Piratical activity in the Bay was sporadic at first, but noticeably intensified in the 1570s, due principally to Elizabethan sea dogs, who more than offset a concomitant decline in French presence. This tide is thought to have reached Belize in the 1630s, and to have contributed to demographic flight away from the coast. (Note: Masne 2011, para. 29; Graham 2011, p. 246; Jones 1989, pp. 191–192, 229–230.)

==== Maya rebellion ====
By the opening years of the seventeenth century, 'resistance and rebellion were in the air' in the Bacalar district. (Note: Graham 2011, pp. 50, 239; Jones 1989, p. 132.) The yet unconquered Peten Itza kingdom is thought to have been the primary driver of resistance, encouraging widespread flight towards its zone of refuge. Further motivating factors may have included famine conditions (from increased encomienda demands, and harvest shortfalls), and piratical depradations. (Note: Graham 2011, p. 246; Jones 1989, pp. 18–19, 23, 58, 61–62, 214.)

The earliest sign of something being awry was the desertion of encomienda towns near Tipu, possibly due to increasingly burdensome tribute obligations, necessitating reduccions in 1608 and again in 1615. (Note: Graham 2011, pp. 243–244; Jones 1989, pp. 18, 132, 192–193.) Three years later, the Fuensalida–Orbita mission left the friars with a (well-founded) fear 'that an alliance was developing between Tipu and the Itzas,' and further strained Spanish relations with Peten Itza. (Note: Graham 2011, pp. 243–244; Jones 1989, pp. 18–19, 135–148.) Further missions to Peten Itza in 1619 and 1623 similarly failed, the latter spectacularly so (the entire missionary party of over 80 having been executed, purportedly for desecrating an Itza temple). (Note: Graham 2011, p. 244; Jones 1989, pp. 148–152, 176–178.) Said mass execution or massacre was promptly followed by another in 1624 in La Pimienta, this time due to egregiously ill treatment by an entrada party. (Note: Graham 2011, pp. 244–146; Jones 1989, pp. 19, 178–187.)

Conditions only worsened for the Spanish in the 1630s. (Note: Graham 2011, p. 246; Jones 1989, p. 199.) The decade opened with desertion in Xibun and Soite, and closed with the pivotal Tipu rebellion, which (within a few years) depleted Bacalar of most of their Maya population. (Note: Graham 2011, pp. 246–247; Jones 1989, pp. 19, 23–24, 199–230.)

== Demographics ==
The majority of the pre-conquest population is thought to have been settled in riverine towns and villages during the wet and dry seasons, with a minority moving to coastal villages during the dry. (Note: Except for San Pedro and Santa Rita, coastal pre-conquest settlements seem to have been seasonal villages only (Graham 2011, pp. 118–119).)

The post-conquest Maya population of Bacalar is thought to have been spread around some 25 settlements across the district in 1544. (Note: Though 'locations of only five [Chanlacan, Chetumal, Colmotz, Lamanai, Tipu] are supported to varying degrees by archaeological evidence' (Graham 2011, p. 199).) But both 'flight and population loss characterised the years after 1544 in the Bacalar province,' with Bienvenida claiming that a town of 100 households would have been large in 1548, where once there were towns of 500 to 1,000. (Note: Graham 2011, pp. 203–204; Jones 1989, p. 45. Though depopulation of Chetumal or Dzuluinicob may have begun 'as early as 1531, if not before' (Graham 2011, p. 203).) In the district (unlike in the rest of Yucatán), 'original population levels were never recovered' after conquest.

The Spanish population of Bacalar is thought to have never surpassed some estimated 130 individuals, with vecinos numbering fewer than circa 30. The tributary Maya population is estimated to have been some six to seven times greater, at least, possibly reaching circa 1,500 or 1,600. The non-tributary Maya population, living beyond Spanish reach, is thought have amounted to 'perhaps an equal number or even more.'

== Economy ==
Belize's pre-conquest polities are thought to have been especially focussed on trade. Archaeological and historical evidence strongly suggest Chetumal, for instance, maintained overland or maritime trade with at least Uaymil (a neighbouring polity) and Acalan, Ecab, and Mani (polities further afield), while Dzuluinicob and Manche Chol maintained heavy overland trade with at least Peten Itza. (Note: Graham 2011, pp. 47, 52, 157; Jones 1989, pp. 101–106.) Additional economic activities are thought to have included cash crop farming (of cacao, annatto, vanilla), beekeeping, and subsistence farming, hunting, and fishing. Commerce and these enterprises are thought to have carried on after conquest.

Encomiendas were first established in Belize in 1544, and lasted 'for about a century and a half.' (Note: Graham 2011, pp. 49, 109, 156–157, 163, 203. There are thought to have been at least five encomiendas initially, held by two alcades and three regidors of the Bacalar cabildo (Graham 2011, p. 203). Restructured at least once, during 1608– or 1615–1622 (Graham 2011, pp. 207, 239–240).) They are not thought to have been altogether different from the pre-conquest tributary system, though, except that tributaries now paid 'different people different things in different amounts,' with the Spanish now primarily demanding (possibly onerous quantities of) cotton, honey, salt, beeswax, maize, and especially cacao. (Note: Graham 2011, pp. 196–197; Jones 1989, pp. 18–19, 39, 41–42, 106.) Though details are scarce, total encomienda income has been estimated at 'no more than 1,500 pesos' per annum, leading Jones to posit that it 'must have comprised a relatively small proportion' of the villa's revenue. (Note: Graham 2011, p. 164; Jones 1989, pp. 41, 45, 69, 73.)

The Spanish in Bacalar are thought to have similarly focussed on trade with coastal Mopan and Manche Chol villages, and with Yucatán and Honduras, in addition to internal commerce. Further minor economic activities possibly included cattle ranching in Chetumal, cacao farming on New River, and salt making in Ambergris Caye.

== Society ==
Post-conquest society was 'formally and functionally' split into native and Spanish classes, with the former heavily outnumbering the latter in Yucatán, which disparity is thought to have afforded the Maya some degree of autonomy. Nonetheless, the Spanish are thought to have 'in general, behaved towards their Maya neighbours and "subjects" as though the native population was there to be exploited for the comfort and survival of the colonists.'

== Warfare ==
Though little is known of Maya warfare prior to conquest, its rules of engagement are broadly thought to have been quite distinct to Spanish ones. Most starkly, Mayanists have noted the 'tacitcal discrepancy between the Spaniards' willingness to kill large numbers of Mayas indiscriminately, and the Mayas' preference for person-to-person combat and the taking of captives.' Furthermore, battle is thought to have been ritualised, with rules of engagement 'which were agreed upon by all parties concerned–except, of course, Spanish soldiers.' Aims of warfare have also historically been thought to differ, with the Spanish waging war for acquisition of territory, profit, and conversion to Catholicism, and the Maya for acquisition of slaves and human sacrifice. The latter has come under scrutiny recently though, with some scholars arguing that profit (via the acquisition of tributary rights) was likely the primary motive for war.

== Government ==
=== Pre conquest ===
Maya polities at the eve of conquest are now thought to have been primarily defined as networks of interpersonal relationships, rather than well-delimited territories. (Note: Graham 2011, pp. 29–34, 46. Originally elucidated by Roys, and historically since the Spanish period, 'rather too strictly in terms of territorial boundaries' (Graham 2011, pp. 29–30).) That is, the polity is thought to have been constituted by a set of people (and whatever space they happened to inhabit), rather than being made up of a demarcated space (and whatever people happened to inhabit it). Polities may have arisen from pre-existing chibals, and the newly-formed interpersonal relationships further knitting them together may have been patron-client ones entailing allegiance, tribute, among other rights and obligations. That is, an ambitious chibal may have risen to power (and thus formed a polity) 'not based on control of resources through acquisition of territory in which the actual resources lay or grew or were extracted, but rather, on control of resources through acquisition of rights to what was produced.'

=== Post conquest ===
The cabildo was the principal institution of governance in Bacalar. In its early years, the cabildo of Bacalar was composed of two alcaldes and three regidors (plus the escribano and procurador, ex officio), with alcaldes holding principal executive and judicial authority. By the 1570s, the cabildo had been reorganised to include only one alcalde and four regidors. Members were resident, encomienda-holding vecinos elected annually by outgoing members, though offices 'tended to be dominated by strong men [...] as there were probably never more than ten or so qualified vecinos.' (Note: Jones 1989, pp. 75–76, 78. By the end of the period, for instance, 'members of the Sanchez, Aguilar, and Diaz families rotated through these various [cabildo] positions throughout the [17th] century, tightly controlling every aspect—especially the financial one—of the community's affairs' (Jones 1989, p. 76).)

Some aspects of pre-conquest political organisation 'were maintained under Spanish rule,' such as tribute arrangements.

== Legacy ==
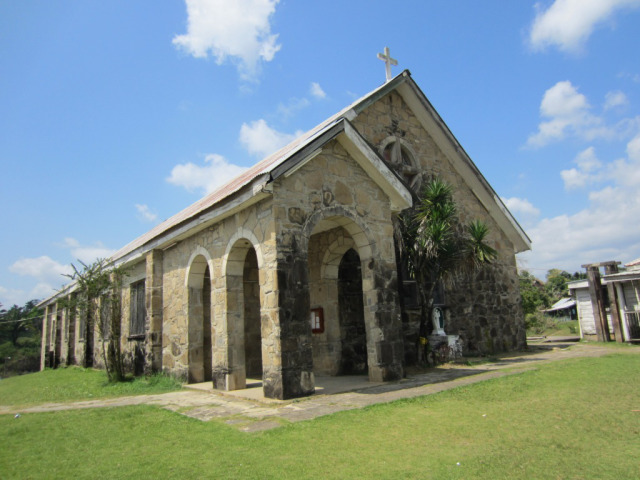
Modern Catholic church in San Antonio, Toledo / 2013 photograph / via Commons

=== In culture ===
The Spanish colonial project in Belize is popularly deemed a failure. (Note: Graham 2011, pp. 105, 107–108.) Catholic missions, on the other hand, 'had a lasting religious impact,' with Graham contending that Mayas genuinely came to see themselves as Christians, and so kept said faith even upon Spanish withdrawal. (Note: Restall 2019, p. 10; Graham 2011, pp. 3, 164, 197–198.)

=== In scholarship ===
Spanish records are especially scarce and unreliable for Belize, particularly for its southern half. (Note: Geographically and ethnographically (Aliphat 2013, pp. 839–840, 845–846, 849–851, 869–872; Becquey 2012, paras. 2-3; Masne 2011, para. 34, fn. 31; Restall 2019, pp. 5–6; Graham 2011, pp. 37, 39, 46–47, 110–111; Jones 1989, pp. vii–viii, 93.). In this regard, Graham noted – Belize never crystallised as a place in European consciousness of the sixteenth century. If Belize was anything, it was a liminal, elusive, shifting, dangerous space, neither land nor sea, neither here nor there, betwixt and between an idea of a 'Yucatan' and an idea of a 'Kingdom of Guatemala.' — Graham 2011, p. 107. Which sentiment Restall felt applied likewise into the Precolonial period (Restall 2019, pp. 2–3).) Such historical and ethnographic sources nonetheless remain the mainstay of scholarship on this period, though increasingly supplemented by archaeological evidence, especially in Mayanist works. (Note: Graham 2011, pp. 12, 16, 194–195; Jones 1989, p. 4.) Graham, for instance, used excavations at Tipu and Lamanai for their study of Hispano–Maya religious interaction.

Some of the earliest published historical work on this period was Cogolludo's Historia de Yucatan, written 1647–1656 and published 1688. (Note: Diccionario Biográfico electrónico, art. 'Diego López Cogolludo'; Graham 2011, p. 240.) Further landmarks included Chamberlain's 1948 Conquest and Colonization, Roy's 1957 Political Geography, and Jones's 1989 Maya Resistance.

== Timeline ==
Prominent Spanish period events in Belize and periphery. (Note: Upper and lower bounds given. Some dates in Julian calendar. Polities abbreviated as Bacl (Bacalar), ChDz (Chet and Dzul), Chet (Chetumal), Dzul (Dzuluinicob), Far (none of those listed here), ManC (Manche Chol), MnMp (ManC and Mopn), Mopn (Mopan), Near (surrounding polities). Bodies of water abbreviated as BayA (waters off Amatique or otherwise equidistant from BayH and BayY), BayH (waters off Honduras including islands), BayY (waters of Belize and Quintana Roo including atolls, cayes, islands, reefs), Bay (any of the preceding). No other places given. Only one place given per entry. Places in or off Belize given in preference to or to exclusion of others.)
Start	End	Place	Event	Notes
14 Jul 1502	Aug 1502	BayH	Honduran leg of Columbus's fourth voyage	cf (Note: Diccionario Biográfico electrónico, art. 'Cristóbal Colón'; Graham 2011, p. 122. Earliest notice of Honduras Bay (Reichert 2017, p. 13). Though Pinzon possibly in Bay in 1496–1499 (Graham 2011, p. 123).)
Jun 1508	29 Aug 1509	BayY	Pinzon–Solis voyage	cf (Note: Diccionario Biográfico electrónico, art. 'Vicente Yáñez Pinzón'; Reichert 2017, p. 14; Graham 2011, pp. 122–123. Possibly noted the Cockscombs, Belize's 'most conspicuous landmark from the sea' (Graham 2011, p. 122). Pinzon possibly in Honduras Bay in 1496–1499 too (Graham 2011, p. 123).)
Jan 1511	Dec 1514	Chet	Stranding of Guerrero and company	cf (Note: Diccionario Biográfico electrónico, art. 'Gonzalo Guerrero'; Reichert 2017, pp. 14–15; Graham 2011, pp. 124–125; Jones 1989, pp. 27–28. Including presence of mestizo children prior to 1528 Jones 1989, pp. 27–28. Including possible Spanish enslavement (Jones 1989, pp. 27–28).)
Jan 1515	Dec 1515	Bay	First Spanish slaving expeditions	cf (Note: Graham 2011, p. 130.)
Feb 1517	Dec 1517	BayY	Hernandez de Cordoba expedition	cf
14 Nov 1518	14 Nov 1518	Far	Velazquez named Adelantado of Yucatán	cf (Note: First such (Diccionario Biográfico electrónico, art. 'Diego Velázquez de Cuéllar'). Title and offices pass to Montejo on 8 Dec 1526 (Diccionario Biográfico electrónico, art. 'Francisco de Montejo').)
Jan 1519	Dec 1519	—N/a	Alvarez de Pineda map	cf (Note: First to depict Yucatan as a peninsula 'clearly and with some accuracy' (Restall 2019, p. 8).)
Aug 1519	Oct 1521	Near	Smallpox or measles epidemic	—N/a
3 May 1524	3 May 1524	BayH	Triunfo de la Cruz established	cf (Note: Earliest Spanish settlement in Bay (Masne 2011, map 2). First founded 'a few miles east of Puerto de Caballos' (Melendez 1977, p. 76). Relocated east and renamed Truxillo (modern Trujillo) on 18 May 1525 (Melendez 1977, p. 76). (Confused with Puerto Caballos (settled 1525 and 1544–1605; port use since 1524 and especially since 1536) in Reichert 2017, p. 16 (Melendez 1977, pp. 69–70, 72–73). San Gil de Buenavista also established 1524, but in mouth of Golfo Dulce, and shortly moved inland to Valle de Naco by 1527 (Melendez 1977, p. 71; Reichert 2017, p. 16).))
Mar 1525	Dec 1525	MnMp	Cortes crossing	cf (Note: Graham 2011, p. 157; Jones 1989, pp. 100, 102–103, 295–296.)
Jul 1527	Jul 1528	Chet	Montejo entrada	cf (Note: Graham 2011, pp. 125–127; Jones 1989, pp. 26–28. Including earliest (non-permanent) Spanish settlement in Peninsula, Salamanca de Xelha, near Tulum (Reichert 2017, pp. 18–19).)
Jun 1531	Mar 1533	Chet	Davila entrada	cf (Note: Jones 1989, pp. 29–39. Also called de Avila entrada (Reichert 2017, p. 19). Including earliest (non-permanent) Spanish settlement in Belize, Villa Real de Chetumal, near Chetumal (Reichert 2017, p. 19). Including coasting down the shore of Belize (likely inside the reef) from Chetumal Bay to Truxillo (Reichert 2017, p. 19; Graham 2011, pp. 107, 128–130; Jones 1989, p. 39).)
Jan 1537	Dec 1537	Far	Casas–Maldonado pact	cf (Note: Las Casas spent 1537–1539 setting up Verapaz, the only colony where he deemed the Spanish had ius in re due to natives' 'freely given consent' (Diccionario Biográfico electrónico, art. 'Bartolomé de las Casas').)
22 Feb 1542	22 Feb 1542	BayH	First landing of bozal slaves	cf (Note: First in Bay and Central America; 150 slaves (Masne 2011, para. 25).)
Apr 1543	Dec 1544	ChDz	Pachecos entrada	cf (Note: Graham 2011, pp. 132–133; Jones 1989, pp. 41–45. Including founding of Salamanca de Bacalar in 1544 (Reichert 2017, p. 20).)
Jul 1544	1 Feb 1547	Bacl	Bienvenida voyage	cf (Note: Jones 1989, pp. 42, 60, 85; Graham 2011, pp. 111, 158–160, 314. Earliest known non-expeditionary friar in Belize (Graham 2011, pp. 111, 314). Stayed in Bacalar 'for an unknown period of time' (Graham 2011, p. 158).)
Nov 1544	Dec 1544	BayH	Braques cruise	cf (Note: O 2020, p. 183.)
Nov 1546	Jun 1547	Bacl	Avila survey	—N/a
8 Nov 1546	Mar 1547	Bacl	Pixtemax revolt	cf (Note: Graham 2011, p. 204; Jones 1989, pp. 45–47.)
Jan 1553	Dec 1553	Bacl	Lopez retasacion	cf
Jul 1558	Dec 1558	BayH	Truxillo sacked	cf (Note: Earliest such by pirates in Bay (Masne 2011, para. 27; Reichert 2017, p. 22).)
Jan 1559	Dec 1559	Far	Campeachy sacked	cf (Note: O 2020, pp. 215–216. Earliest such by pirates in Yucatan (Reichert 2017, p. 25).)
Jan 1560	Dec 1561	Far	Toral assumes bishopric	cf (Note: Jones 1989, p. 39. Fourth appointed but first to take office and reside in Yucatan (Graham 2011, pp. 323–324).)
Jan 1565	Dec 1565	Bacl	Bacalar parish established	cf
Apr 1568	Dec 1568	Bacl	Garzon entrada and reduccion	cf (Note: Graham 2011, pp. 205–207, 314; Jones 1989, pp. 17–18, 22, 47–52. Including Franciscan burning of Maya records (Graham 2011, p. 207; Jones 1989, pp. 48–51). Including constitutional crisis (Jones 1989, pp. 78–81). Including possible Maya enslavement (Jones 1989, pp. 50–51).)
Jan 1570	Dec 1571	Bacl	Carillo owns Black slave	cf (Note: Jones 1989, pp. 71, 73, 89. First and only Black individual on record (Jones 1989, pp. 73, 89). Including presence of mulato alcalde prior to 1620 Jones 1989, p. 71.)
13 Jan 1572	13 Jan 1572	BayH	Lutheran raid of Puerto Caballos	cf (Note: O 2020, p. 287.)
23 Feb 1573	22 Mar 1573	BayH	Honduran leg of Drake's expedition	—N/a
Oct 1577	Apr 1578	Bacl	Acles sacks Bacalar	cf (Note: O 2020, pp. 285–286.)
Jan 1598	Dec 1598	BayH	Parker sacks Puerto Caballos	cf
Jan 1602	Dec 1602	Far	Blauveldt sets up base in Bluefields	cf
Jan 1603	Dec 1603	ManC	Esguerra reduccions	cf (Note: 'Officially, the first Spanish incursion' into Manche Chol territory, though 'the very first contact' attributed to Davila's 1524 founding of San Gil Buenavista near Nito, or Cortes's 1525 crossing to Nito (Becquey 2012, para. 20).)
Jan 1605	Dec 1606	Bacl	Bacalar reduccions	cf (Note: Jones 1989, p. 131.)
Jan 1608	Dec 1608	Bacl	Tipu reduccions	cf (Note: Jones 1989, pp. 18, 61, 73, 132, 193.)
Jan 1615	Dec 1615	Bacl	Sanchez reduccions	cf (Note: Jones 1989, pp. 73, 76, 83, 113–114, 132, 192–193.)
1 Apr 1618	8 Dec 1618	Bacl	Fuensalida–Orbita mission	cf (Note: Graham 2011, pp. 240–244, 315; Jones 1989, pp. 135–152. Orbita visited Peten Itza 'probably in 1617' (Graham 2011, p. 314). Fuensalida visited again in 1619 (Graham 2011, p. 315).)
Jan 1620	Dec 1620	Bacl	Diaz visita	cf (Note: Jones 1989, pp. 84, 191, 193.)
Jan 1620	Dec 1620	ManC	Salazar voyage and survey	cf (Note: First to circumnavigate the peninsula (Aliphat 2013, p. 853). Map not extant (Aliphat 2013, pp. 853–854).)
9 Mar 1622	31 Mar 1624	Bacl	Mirones entrada, Delgado mission, Sakalum massacre	cf (Note: Graham 2011, pp. 244–246, 315; Jones 1989, pp. 155–187.)
Sep 1628	Dec 1630	Bacl	Vargas repartimientos and Arguellos inquiry	cf (Note: Jones 1989, p. 197.)
Mar 1630	Mar 1631	Bacl	Xibun–Soite flight, Sanchez reduccion	cf (Note: Graham 2011, p. 246; Jones 1989, pp. 199–203.)
Apr 1631	Dec 1631	ManC	First Tovilla entrada	cf (Note: Proved 'a real failure' (Becquey 2012, para. 20). Breach of Verapaz's and Dominicans' pacifist policy (Becquey 2012, para. 20).)
Jan 1632	Dec 1632	ManC	Second Tovilla entrada	cf (Note: Tovilla loses Real Audiencia of Guatemala support (Becquey 2012, para. 20). Followed by a period of 'about forty years [to 1670s] during which the Manche Chol were again out of Spanish rule' (Becquey 2012, para. 20).)
Jan 1633	Dec 1633	ManC	Manche Chol revolt	—N/a
Jan 1633	Dec 1633	BayH	Truxillo sacked by Dutch	cf (Note: Resulting in period of 'decline and abandonment that lasted until the second half of the 18th century' (Reichert 2017, p. 22).)
Jan 1637	Dec 1637	Bacl	Lamanai reduccion	cf (Note: Jones 1989, pp. 116–117, 204.)
Jan 1637	Dec 1637	ManC	Salazar reduccion	—N/a
Jan 1638	Dec 1638	Bacl	Cogolludo–Vivar voyage	cf (Note: Jones 1989, pp. 311–312, no. 31. Cogolludo possibly crosses Belize (Graham 2011, pp. 160, 316).)
Jan 1638	Dec 1638	Bacl	Tipu rebellion	cf (Note: Graham 2011, pp. 246–247; Jones 1989, pp. 19, 23–24, 51, 101, 108, 115, 190–191, 204–224.)

== Glossary ==
Glossary of terms employed in literature of the Spanish period of Belize. (Note: Diccionario de la lengua española; Diccionario panhispánico del español jurídico; Graham 2011, pp. 375–384; Jones 1989, pp. 341–343. Sources here not further cited in table. Mayan terms marked with asterisk.)
Term	Gloss	Definition	Notes
adelantado	—N/a	someone entrusted with command of a maritime expedition, and granted in advance authority over discovered or conquered lands	—N/a
alcalde alcalde ordinario	mayor, magistrate	1. native justice, magistrate, or judge 2. principal magistrate and administrator of a cabildo	—N/a
auto de fe	—N/a	ecclesiastical sentencing, or resulting punishment	—N/a
batab*	mayor	most senior office holder in a batabil	cf
batabil*	mayor's jurisdiction	first order subdivision of a cuchcabal	—N/a
bozal	non-Hispanicised slave	slave recently taken from Africa	cf (Note: As opposed to a ladino ie Hispanicised slave (Masne 2011, para. 25).)
cabecera	encomienda seat	seat of an encomienda	—N/a
cabildo	council	town or village council	—N/a
cacique	cacique	native lord or high office holder	cf (Note: In Yucatan, at least batabs and halach uinichs (Graham 2011, pp. 45–46).)
cah*	community, home	in Yucatán, town or village, plus surrounding places to which residents had rights of access or use	cf (Note: Graham 2011, pp. 37–38, 163–164. Not territorially bound (Graham 2011, pp. 34, 37–38). A 'basic indigenous geographical, political, and organisational entity that represented a fundamental unit of society and culture' (Graham 2011, pp. 163–164).)
capilla de indios	Indian chapel	mission chapel for natives	cf
capitan general	general	most senior office holder in a capitania general	—N/a
capitania general	—N/a	first order military subdivision of a virreinato	—N/a
capitulacion	—N/a	agreement or pact	—N/a
casta	mixed-race person, mixed-race caste	1. someone of mixed European, native, or African ancestry 2. category of such	cf (Note: Including mestizo (European–native ancestry) and mulato (mulatto).)
chibal*	patronym group, lineage	in Yucatán, group of individuals sharing surname or paternal ancestry	cf (Note: Thought to have formed 'a kind of extended family' within each cah, and fostered kinship outside one's cah, at least after conquest (Graham 2011, p. 38).)
cuchcabal* kuuchkabal	province	in Yucatán, a pre-conquest polity	cf (Note: Either unitary or confederal (Graham 2011, p. 46).)
cuch cab*	alderman, councillor	most senior office holder of a cuchteel	cf
cuchteel*	ward, neighbourhood	first order subdivision of a batabil	cf (Note: Had 'an important role in pre-Columbian tribute, particularly regarding labour requirements' (Graham 2011, p. 164).)
diezmo	tithe	tithe	—N/a
distrito	district	first order subdivision of provincia	—N/a
encomienda	tributary grant, tributary duty, tributary system	1. arrangement by which a native was required to render labour or tribute to a Spaniard; 2. settlement for such established 3. first order subdivision of a distrito 4. the system itself	cf (Note: Graham 2011, pp. 5, 35, 163–164, 203; Jones 1989, pp. 41–42. In Yucatan, 'loosely consonant with the pre-Columbian tribute system, in the sense that the basis of extraction comprised labour and products owed as tribute to particular individuals,' and possibly organised by cahs (Graham 2011, pp. 163–164).)
entrada	campaign	hostile military mobilisation or action against natives	—N/a
escribano escribano publico	public scribe	secretary or clerk of a villa	—N/a
fray	—N/a	title for friar	—N/a
gobernador	governor	most senior office holder in a provincia	—N/a
halach uinic* halach winik	regional lord	most senior office holder in a cuchcabal	cf
indio natural	Indian	native	—N/a
macehual	native commoner	member of native commons	—N/a
maestro	—N/a	choirmaster, sacristan, or chapel master	cf (Note: Graham 2011, pp. 49, 82, 156, 175, 207. Including maestro cantor, maestro de capilla, sacristan mayor, maestro de escuela, ah cambesah (Graham 2011, pp. 207). In Yucatan, included young Maya men taught in Franciscan schools who 'often supervised in rituals and practices' in visita missions (Graham 2011, pp. 49, 82).)
matricula	census	census of population	—N/a
mision	mission	1. ambulating expedition by Spanish clergy or missionaries to proselytise natives 2. settlement so or for such established	—N/a
nacom*	war chief	in Yucatán, a high military office holder	cf
principal hidalgo	—N/a	member of native elite	—N/a
probanza	—N/a	record of individual merit or service	—N/a
procurador comisario, comisario de la real hacienda	attorney-accountant	attorney and accountant of a villa	cf
provincia	province	first order civil subdivision of a virreinato	cf (Note: In Yucatan, also a pre-conquest polity, or succeeding first order subdivisions of distritos, or distritos themselves (Graham 2011, pp. 37).)
real audiencia audiencia real	royal high court	high court of justice with civil (sala de oidores) and criminal (sala de alcaldes) jurisdiction	—N/a
real cedula	royal decree	royal decree	—N/a
reduccion congregacion	reduction	1. forcible relocation or resettlement of natives 2. settlement so established	cf (Note: To concentrated settlements within their original territory, as opposed to expatriation, 'a coercive and violent means' which 'very quickly led to the assimilation and disappearance of' peoples like the Manche Chol (Becquey 2012, para. 47).)
regidor	councillor	member of cabildo	—N/a
regular	regular	friar in a mendicant order	cf (Note: Graham 2011, pp. 138–139.)
repartimiento	—N/a	1. collective form of encomienda 2. forcible Hispano-native barter agreement 3. the practice itself	cf (Note: Was 'an exploitative system, and technically illegal.')
requerimiento	—N/a	manifesto conquistadors were required to read to natives before engaging in hostilities	—N/a
residencia juicio de residencia	—N/a	routine job performance review of public officials upon vacating office	cf (Note: Apparently, primarily to check for misuse of funds.)
retasacion	census	census of native population to adjust encomienda obligations	cf
secular	secular	cleric who is not a regular	cf (Note: Graham 2011, p. 139.)
vecino	—N/a	1. someone who paid taxes to and held land or property in a town 2. Spanish resident of a town	cf
villa	district capital	seat of a distrito	—N/a
virreinato	viceroyalty	first order subdivision of Spanish Empire	—N/a
visita	—N/a	1. extraordinary job performance review of public officials 2. mision with no resident clergy	—N/a

== See also ==
- History of Belize (1506–1862) – survey of Spanish and Precolonial periods

== Notes and references ==
=== References ===
1. Aliphat F MM, Caso Barrera L (2013). "La construcción histórica de las tierras bajas mayas del sur por medio de mapas esquemáticos". Historia Mexicana. 63 (2): 839–875. JSTOR 23608600.
2. Becquey C (2012). "Quelles frontières pour les populations cholanes?". Ateliers d'Anthropologie. 37. doi:10.4000/ateliers.9181.
3. Breuer KH (1993). Colonies of Happenstance: The English Settlements in Central America, 1525–1787 (MA thesis). University of Texas at Artlington. ProQuest 1352917.
4. Breuer KH (2004). Reshaping the Cosmos: Maya Society on the Yucatecan Frontier (PhD thesis). Vanderbilt University. ProQuest 3127229.
5. Escamilla Peraza R (2012). Los caminos de Yucatán en la encrucijada del siglo XVI (MA thesis). Centro de Investigaciones y Estudios Superiores en Antropología Social.
6. Espinosa Sanchez JM, ed. (2011). Arte e historia en el sur colonial de Quintana Roo, siglos XVI–XVIII. Mexico City: Plaza y Valdés Editores. hdl:20.500.12249/1468. ISBN 978-607-402-387-9.
7. Feldman LH, ed. (2000). Lost Shores, Forgotten Peoples: Spanish Explorations of the South East Mayan Lowlands. Durham, North Carolina: Duke University Press. ISBN 0-8223-2630-2. LCCN 00029397.
8. Gerhard P (1979). The Southeast Frontier of New Spain. Princeton, New Jersey: Princeton University Press. ISBN 0-691-05273-5. LCCN 78-70295. OL 4749458M.
9. Graham E (2011). Maya Christians and Their Churches in Sixteenth-Century Belize. Gainesville, Florida: University Press of Florida. ISBN 978-0-8130-3666-3. LCCN 2011011290.
10. Jones GD (1989). Maya Resistance to Spanish Rule: Time and History on a Colonial Frontier. Albuquerque, New Mexico: University of New Mexico Press. ISBN 0-8263-1161-X. LCCN 89-36041.
11. Jones GD (1998). The Conquest of the Last Maya Kingdom. Stanford, California: Stanford University Press. ISBN 0-8047-3317-1. LCCN 98-16556.
12. Lujan Munoz J, Chinchilla Aguilar E, eds. (1993). Dominación española: Desde la conquista hasta 1700. Historia general de Guatemala. Vol. II. Guatemala, Guatemala: Asociación de Amigos del País; Fundación para la Cultura y el Desarrollo. ISBN 84-88622-02-3.
13. Lujan Munoz J, Pepenoe de Hatch M, eds. (1999). Epoca precolombina. Historia general de Guatemala. Vol. I. Guatemala, Guatemala: Asociación de Amigos del País; Fundación para la Cultura y el Desarrollo. ISBN 84-88622-08-2.
14. le Masne C (2011). "L'invention de la façade caraïbe centraméricaine: indios, negros, y piratas". Amerika. 4. doi:10.4000/amerika.2210.
15. Mayr RJ (2014). Belize: Tracking the Path of its History. Munster, Germany: Lit Verlag. ISBN 978-3-643-90481-2.
16. Melendez Chaverri C (1977). "Ciudades fundadas en la América Central en el siglo XVI (sinópsis alfabética)". Anuario de Estudios Centroamericanos. 3 (3): 57–79. JSTOR 25661609.
17. Morales Rosas JJ (2008) [First published 1994 by CIE]. Bacalar: XVI siglos de historia (reprint of 1st ed.). Chetumal, Mexico: Secretaría de Cultura del Gobierno del Estado de Quintana Roo. ISBN 978-607-7707-06-6.
18. Velasco Murillo D, Schwaller RC (2024). Murillo DV, Schwaller RC (eds.). Overlooked Places and Peoples: Indigenous and African Resistance in Colonial Spanish America, 1500-1800. New York: Routledge. doi:10.4324/9781032721460. ISBN 978-1-032-72146-0. LCCN 2023059086.
19. de la O Torres RA (2020). De corsarios, mares y costas: El corso en la construcción del espacio y experiencias marítimas en el Golfo-Caribe, 1527-1620. Aguascalientes, Mexico: Universidad Autónoma de Aguascalientes. doi:10.33064/UAA/978-607-8714-67-4. ISBN 978-607-8714-59-9.
20. Quezada S (2014) [First published 1993 by CM in Spanish]. Maya Lords and Lordship: The Formation of Colonial Society in Yucatán, 1350–1600. Translated by Rugeley T. Norman, Oklahoma: University of Oklahoma Press. ISBN 978-0-8061-4422-1. LCCN 2013019099.
21. Diccionario Biográfico electrónico. Real Academia de la Historia)).
22. Diccionario de la lengua española. 23.7 online vers. (23rd ed.). Real Academia Española.
23. Diccionario panhispánico del español jurídico (Online ed.). Real Academia Española.
24. Reichert R (2017). "El golfo de Honduras: Estrategias geopolíticas y militares de una frontera imperial, siglos XVI–XVIII". Tzintzun. 65: 9–40. doi:10.35830/treh.vi65.623 (inactive 1 July 2025). ISSN 2007-963X.
25. Restall M (2019). "Creating 'Belize': The Mapping and Naming History of a Liminal Locale". Terrae Incognitae. 51 (1): 5–35. doi:10.1080/00822884.2019.1573962.
26. Smith ME, Berdan FF (2003). The Postclassic Mesoamerican World. Salt Lake City, Utah: University of Utah Press. ISBN 0-87480-734-4. LCCN 2002013834.
