= Dzuluinicob =

Maya polity in Yucatan, dissolved 1544

Coordinates: 18.1231°N 88.4410°W

Dzuluinicob u kuchkabal Ts'ulwinikob (Yucatec Maya)
- during 10th to 16th cent.–1544
- Dzuluinicob settlements (c. 16th cent.)
- Status: Dissolved
- Capital: Tipu
- Common languages: Yucatec Maya
- Religion: Maya polytheism
- Government: Confederal kuchkabal
- Historical era: Postclassic to Spanish
  - Established: during 10th to 16th cent.
  - Pachecos entrada: 1544
Succeeded by
Spanish Yucatan
- Today part of: Belize

Dzuluinicob (Note: Also Dzuluinikob, Tz'ul Winikob', Ts'ulwinikob; often preceded or succeeded by province or Province (as in Province of Dzuluinicob or Ts'ulwinikob province). Pronounced /zjuːl.ˈwiː.nɪ.kɔːb/ zool-WEE-nih-cawb. Natively u kuchkabal Ts'ulwinikob, pronounced [u kutʃ.ka.ˈbal t͡sʼul.ˌwiː.niː.ˈkoɓ].) was a Postclassic Maya polity (kuchkabal) in the southern Maya Lowlands, in what is now Belize. It is thought to have been established during the Postclassic period, and to have been annexed by Spanish Yucatan in 1544, upon the successful Pachecos entrada. Scarce little is yet known about the province, having only been rediscovered or proposed in the 1980s by Grant D. Jones, a Mayanist scholar from the American Hamilton and Davidson Colleges. Consequently, Dzuluinicob is today noted in specialist literature, but little known elsewhere, including in popular culture.

== Geography ==
Dzuluinicob is most commonly thought to have encompassed, at least, the majority of the Belize River drainage basin. Some scholars further locate the drainage basins of the New, Sibun, and Sittee Rivers within the province. The province thus abbutted Chetumal to the north, the Mopan and Manche Ch'ol territories to the south, and the Peten Itza kingdom to the west. Neighbours further afield included Waymil to the north, and the Kowoj and Yalain polities to the west.

== History ==
With few notable exceptions, the ninth and tenth centuries of the Classic collapse are thought to have been a period of gradual but marked political and demographic collapse in city-states within what would later become Dzuluinicob. Though scarce little is known of the province's pre-Columbian history, given the aforementioned population glut, it has been suggested that Dzuluinicob may have emerged as a polity after a significant wave of immigration into the region. The said demographic influx is thought to have been similar and coincident with that which gave rise to the neighbouring Peten Itza kingdom, which is known to have involved immigration by northerly batabs ('aristocratic mayors') and their households upon the collapse of Mayapan and consequent disintegration of the regional council of provincial governors (the League of Mayapan). The burgeoning province is thought to have grown much closer to its westerly neighbours in Peten, given the observed similarity of their pre-Columbian material cultures, than to its northerly neighbours like Chetumal, given the observed dissimilarity of their material cultures.

Dzuluinicob is commonly thought to have been annexed to Spanish Yucatan during the Pachecos entrada in 1544.

== Society ==
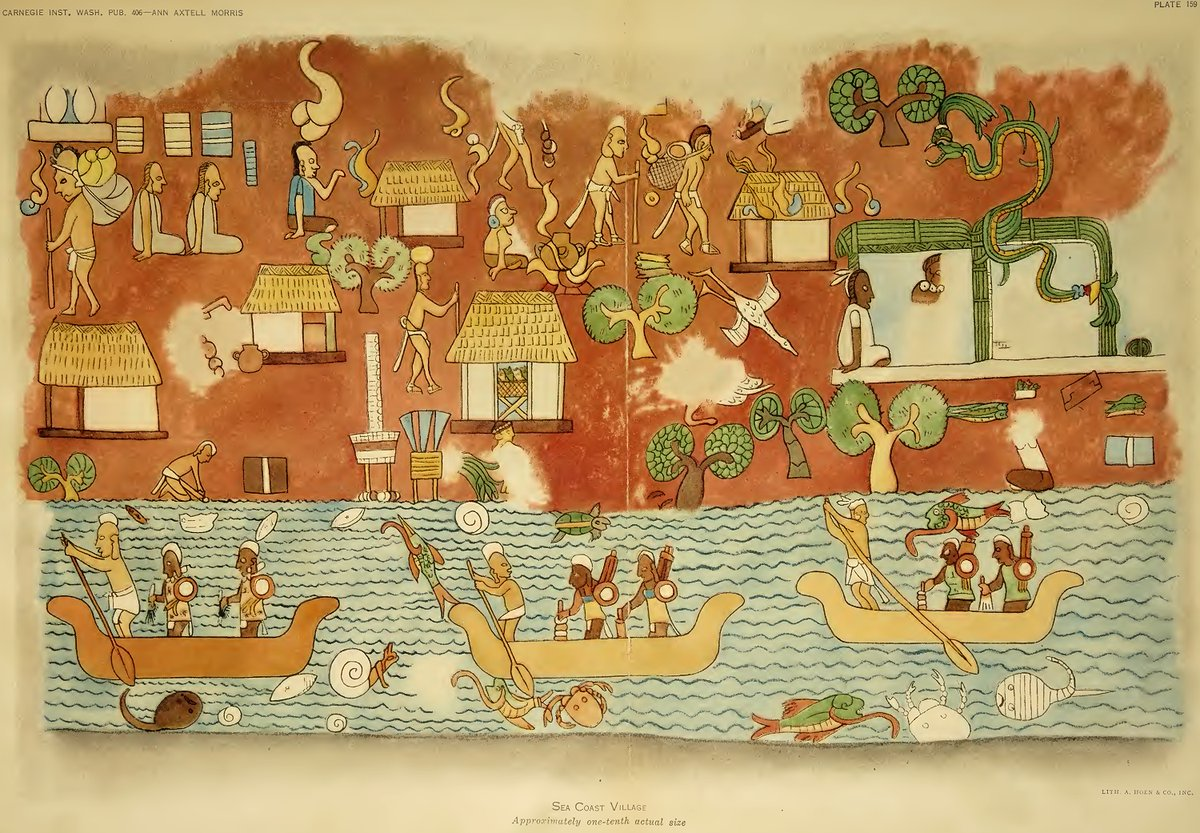
Postclassic fresco from Chichen Itza depicting a coastal trading village

The province is thought to have been "a major player in [southern Maya Lowlands] cacao cultivation and trade". Some Muzul Maya people, in addition, are thought to have numbered amongst Dzuluinicob's residents, at least in the capital.

== Legacy ==
None of Dzuluinicob's records are extant. Consequently, all scholarship on the province has relied on later Spanish records and modern archaeology. The province was first brought to attention by Grant D. Jones's 1989 Maya Resistance to Spanish Rule, based on 1982–1983 archival work at the General Archive of the Indies.

The northern half of Belize, which under the Spanish became the greater part of the Bacalar province, was indigenously a province of Yucatec-speakers known as Dzuluinicob ... Earlier writers were unaware of the existence of Dzuluinicob and attributed far more influence to the province of Chetumal than it now appears to have had. / Because the sole direct reference to Dzuluinicob as a provincial entity is in a unique early version of Melchor Pacheco's probanza, (Note: The Pacheco probanza is catalogued but not digitised by the Portal de Archivos Españoles under reference number ESCRIBANIA,304B.) it would be foolhardy to venture specific claims regarding its territorial limits. I have nonetheless argued throughout this study that Tipu was the political centre of this apparently extensive province, which must have included territory all the way from the Sibun River north to the lower New River.

Aspects of the province as originally characterised have since been called into question. For instance, whilst Jones located Lamanai as a settlement of Dzuluinicob, recent literature has noted that pre-Columbian material recovered from Lamanai "is without any doubt distinctive from that [recovered] at Tipu", such that "it is hard to see them [Lamanai and Tipu] as part of a single 'provincial' unit". Similarly, whilst Jones originally glossed ts'ul winiko'ob as 'foreign people', in keeping with 1980s scholarly consensus, recent literature has noted that the term might rather mean 'gentlemen' or 'members of the Ts'ul lineage'.

== Notes and references ==
=== References ===
1. anon., ed. (2008). A geography of Belize : the land and its people (Rev. 11th ed.). Benque Viejo, Belize: Cubola. OCLC 530699621.
2. Arnauld, M. Charlotte; Beekman, Christopher; Pereira, Grégory, eds. (2021). Mobility and Migration in Ancient Mesoamerican Cities. Boulder, Colorado: University Press of Colorado. OCLC 1178868569.
3. Barrera Vásquez, Alfredo, ed. (1980). Diccionario maya Cordemex : maya-español, español-maya. Mérida, Yucatán: Ediciones Cordemex. OCLC 7550928.
4. Bracamonte y Sosa, Pedro (2001). La conquista inconclusa de Yucatán : los mayas de la montaña, 1560-1680. Colección Peninsular; Serie Estudios. México, DF: Centro de Investigaciones y Estudios Superiores en Antropología Social : Miguel Angel Porrúa : Universidad de Quintana Roo. ISBN 9707011599. OCLC 49519206.
5. Chase, Arlen F.; Rice, Prudence M., eds. (1985). The Lowland Maya Postclassic. Austin, Texas: University of Texas Press. hdl:2027/txu.059173018481763. ISBN 9780292746435. OCLC 10924247.
6. Farris, Nancy M. (1992) [First published 1984 by PUP]. Maya Society under Colonial Rule The Collective Enterprise of Survival (5th corrected reprint of 1st ed.). Princeton, New Jersey: Princeton University Press. ISBN 9780691235400. OCLC 1273306087.
7. Gomburg, Emmalea (2018). Investigating Possible Scurvy in the Postclassic Maya of Tipu (MA). Hattiesburg, Mississippi: University of Southern Mississippi.
8. Graham, Elizabeth A. (2011). Maya Christians and Their Churches in Sixteenth-Century Belize. Maya studies. Gainesville, Florida: University Press of Florida. OCLC 751694131.
9. Harrison-Buck, Eleanor (2007). Materializing identity among the Terminal Classic Maya: Architecture and ceramics in the Sibun Valley, Belize (PhD). Boston, Massachusetts: Boston University. ProQuest 304897391.
10. Harvey, Amanda R. (2018). An Analysis of Maya Foodways: Stable Isotopes and Oral Indicators of Diet in West Central Belize (PhD). Reno, Nev.: University of Nevada, Reno. ProQuest 2082266936.
11. Hofling, Charles Andrew, ed. (2011). Mopan Maya - Spanish - English dictionary : diccionario Maya Mopan - Español - Ingles. Salt Lake City, Utah: University of Utah Press. OCLC 639161518.
12. Jones, Grant D. (1989). Maya resistance to Spanish rule : time and history on a colonial frontier. Albuquerque, New Mexico: University of New Mexico Press. hdl:2027/mdp.39015015491791. ISBN 9780826311610. OCLC 20012099.
13. Jones, Grant D. (1998). The conquest of the last Maya kingdom. Stanford, California: Stanford University Press. hdl:2027/heb.03515. OCLC 38747674.
14. Meissner, Nathan J. (2014). Technological systems of small point weaponry of the Postclassic Lowland Maya (a.d. 1400 - 1697) (PhD). Carbondale, Illinois: Southern Illinois University. ProQuest 1660540689.
15. Messner, Nathan J. (2020). "The Porous Boundary: Comparing Late Postclassic–Early Colonial Maya Projectile Technologies Across Peten and Belize". Ancient Mesoamerica. 31 (3): 526–542. doi:10.1017/S0956536120000140.
16. Morandi, Steven J. (2010). Xibun Maya: The archaeology of an early Spanish colonial frontier in southeastern Yucatán (PhD). Boston, Massachusetts: Boston University. ProQuest 305184024.
17. Morris, John; Jones, Sherilyne; Awe, Jaime; Thompson, George; Badillo, Melissa, eds. (2010). Archaeological investigations in the eastern Maya lowlands : papers of the 2009 Belize Archaeology Symposium. Research reports in Belizean archaeology. Vol. 7. Belmopan, Belize: Institute of Archaeology, National Institute of Culture and History. ISBN 9789768197368. OCLC 714903259.
18. Okoshi, Tsubasa; Chase, Arlen F.; Nondédéo, Philippe; Arnauld, M. Charlotte, eds. (2021). Maya Kingship: Rupture and Transformation from Classic to Postclassic Times. Gainesville, Florida: University Press of Florida. OCLC 1193557896.
19. Orser, Charles E., ed. (2002). Encyclopedia of Historical Archaeology. London & New York: Routledge. OCLC 47894546.
20. Pugh, Timothy W.; Cecil, Leslie G. (2004). Maya Worldviews at Conquest. Mesoamerican Worlds Series. Boulder, Colorado: University Press of Colorado. OCLC 558844310.
21. Quezada, Sergio (2014) [First published 1993 by Colegio de México]. Pueblos y caciques yucatecos, 1550-1580 [Maya lords and lordship : the formation of colonial society in Yucatán, 1350-1600]. Translated by Rugeley, Terry (Revised translation of 1993 Spanish ed.). Norman, Oklahoma: University of Oklahoma Press. OCLC 847529166.
22. Rice, Prudence M. (2004). Maya Political Science: Time, Astrology, and the Cosmos. The Linda Schele series in Maya and pre-Columbian studies. Austin, Texas: University of Texas Press. OCLC 60612439.
23. Sabloff, Jeremy A.; Andrews V, E. Wyllys, eds. (1986). Late Lowland Maya civilization : classic to postclassic. School of American Research advanced seminar series. Albuquerque, New Mexico: University of New Mexico Press. hdl:2027/txu.059173018481821. ISBN 9780826308368. OCLC 12420464.
24. Sharer, Robert J.; Traxler, Loa P., eds. (2006). The Ancient Maya (6th ed.). Stanford, California: Stanford University Press. hdl:2027/mdp.39015062626216. ISBN 9780804748179. OCLC 57577446.
25. Smith, Michael E.; Berdan, Frances F., eds. (2003). The postclassic Mesoamerican world. Salt Lake City, UT: University of Utah Press. ISBN 0874807344. OCLC 50503226.
26. Trask, Willa Rachel (2018). Missionization and Shifting Mobility on the Southeastern Maya-Spanish Frontier: Identifying Immigration to the Maya Site of Tipu, Belize Through the Use of Strontium and Oxygen Isotopes (PhD). College Station, Texas: Texas A&M University. hdl:1969.1/174168.
27. Walker, Debra S., ed. (2016). Perspectives on the Ancient Maya of Chetumal Bay. Gainesville, Florida: University Press of Florida. OCLC 948670056.
