= Mopan territory =

Maya polity in Yucatan, dissolved 1690s

Coordinates: 16.744°N 89.068°W

Mopan territory Aikal (Mopán Maya)
- during 10th to 16th cent.–1690s
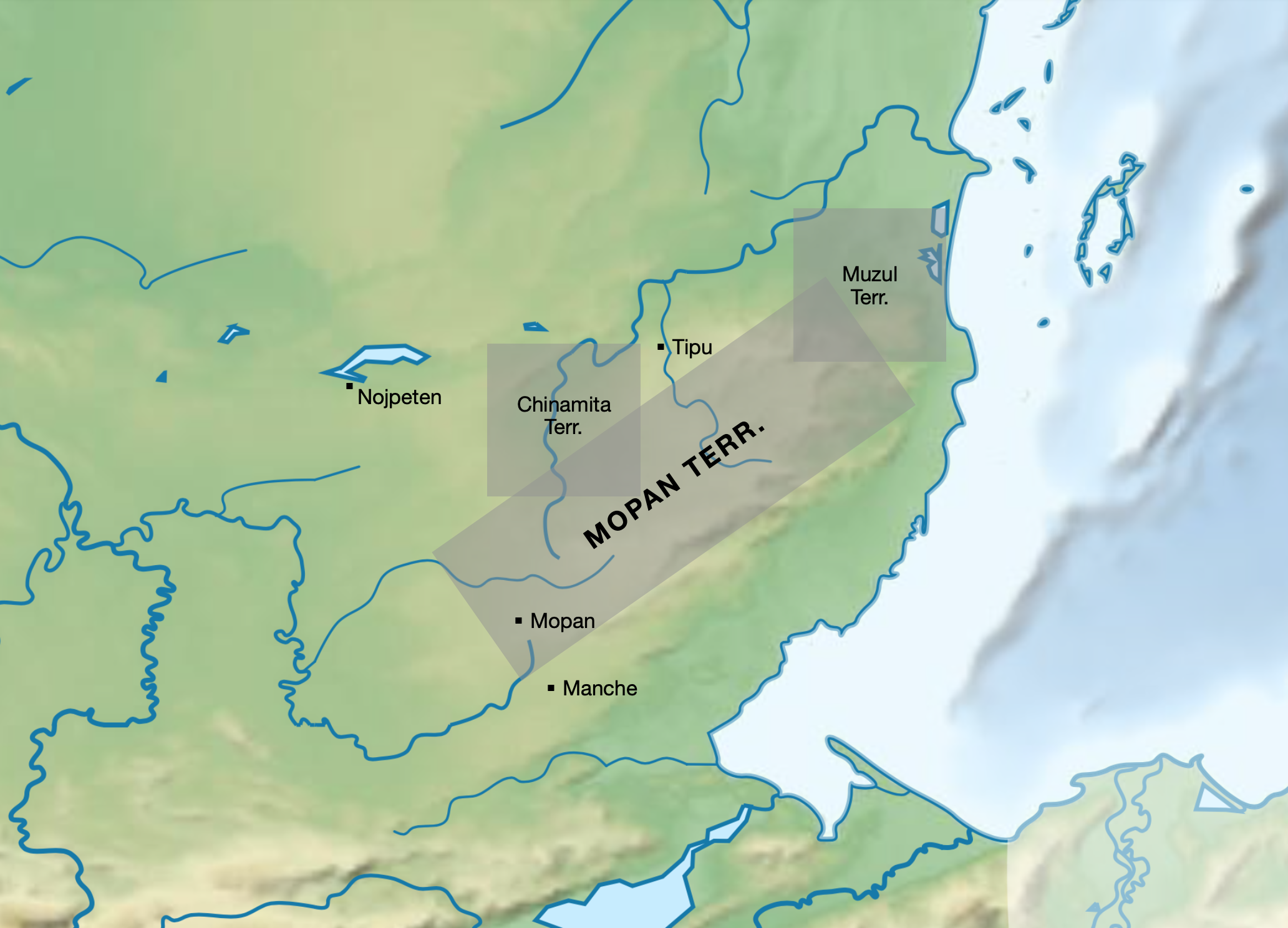
- Mopan territory's location (17th cent.)
- Status: Dissolved
- Capital: Mopan
- Common languages: Mopan Maya
- Religion: Maya polytheism
- Demonyms: Mopan; Aycal
- Government: Confederal kuchkabal
- Principal batab
  - c. 1695 to c. 1697: Taxim Chan (last known)
- Historical era: Postclassic to Precolonial
  - Established: during 10th to 16th cent.
  - Disestablished: 1690s

Population
  - c. 1692: 10,000 to 20,000 (est.)
Succeeded by
Bay settlement; Spanish Peten
- Today part of: Belize; Guatemala

The Mopan territory (Note: Also Mopan, Mopan Territory. Historically Aycal. Natively Aikal. Possibly mo-o-pa-na in the Maya script, for the Classic Mayan toponym mo'pan, per a Classic inscription from Naj Tunich. Possibly Omon, Oman.) was a Postclassic Maya polity (kuchkabal) in the southern Maya Lowlands, in what is now Belize and Peten, Guatemala. It is thought to have been established sometime during the Postclassic period, and to have been annexed by Spanish Peten in the 1690s, upon the successful conquest of Peten. The eastern half of the territory was gradually encroached upon by the newfound Bay settlement in the sixteenth and seventeenth centuries, though, forcing Spanish reducciones to extend to the 1720s. The polity's last known leader was Taxim Chan (Note: Also Taximchan, Taximchán, Tahchinchan. Taxim Chan in.) (fl. c. 1695–c. 1697), about whom little is known. The territory is today similarly seldom treated in Mayanist scholarship, despite being noted since the seventeenth century, and scarcely notable in popular culture. The modern Mopan people are thought to descend from the former territory's residents.

== Geography ==
The Mopan territory lay immediately north of the Manche Chol territory, and southeast of the Peten Itza kingdom in Lake Peten, with the modern town of San Luis, Peten deemed the most likely site of the territory's eponymous capital. Though its full extent remains virtually unknown, the territory is thought to have stretched north along the Mopan River, thereby encompassing the Chinamita territory, and east to the Sittee and Sibun Rivers, thereby further encompassing the Muzul territory. This would situate the polity directly south of the Dzuluinicob province, southeast of the Peten Itza kingdom, east of Lacandon territory, and north and west of the Manche Chol territory. The aforementioned kingdom, in particular, is thought to have held marked political, cultural, or religious influence over the territory.

== History ==
Classic Maya city-states in what would later become the Mopan territory are believed to have met their political and demographic demise during the mid-ninth to mid-tenth centuries of the Classic collapse, with only residual hinterland settlements remaining afterwards.

=== Columbian ===
The earliest non-Amerindian arrival to the Mopan territory may have been Hernan Cortes, who in 1525 is thought to have crossed its northeastern portion. The earliest Spanish military campaign into the territory may have been the 1543–1544 Pachecos entrada, which failed to annex it to Spanish Yucatan due to the timely intercession of Dominican friars. The latter effected the earliest proselytising and reduccion efforts in the region in the mid-sixteenth century, but notably had little luck. Their repeated failures prompted more determined Spanish activity beginning in the 1570s, which continued unabated throughout the seventeeth century.

According to the Kan Ek' of the Peten Itza kingdom, the territory was attacked by the former "in the last years before the arrival of the Spanish" to Tayasal in 1697, apparently in a bid to conquer their neighbours. This is naturally thought to have strained Itza–Mopan relations.

The Spanish conquest of Peten resulted in the western portion of the territory being "militarily bludgeoned into submission at the end of the seventeenth century". Coincident and ensuing Spanish reducciones throughout the now-conquered territory (including its eastern portion) forcibly removed most residents to the newly-founded Spanish Peten by the 1720s.

== Society ==
From the mid-tenth century, the emerging or future Mopan territory was dotted by dispersed, riverine hamlets, each consisting of one or a few families of Mopan speakers. These settlements are thought to have been rather modest, as by the sixteenth century, most displayed little evidence of material wealth (with religious temples being little distinguished from residential abodes, for instance). The hamlets are thought to have organised themselves into various lineage groups which, collectively, would have constituted the polity proper. An exception to this rule may have been the eponymous territorial capital, where the political leader (the foremost or principal batab or 'mayor', known as the cacique principal to the Spanish) would have resided. In circa 1695, the latter was identified as Taxim Chan, whose town was reportedly "the largest Mopan settlement, with five hundred inhabitants and 'an idol [religious effigy] with mother-of-pearl eyes'". The principal batab was still the same Chan some two years later.

== Legacy ==
Bathers (centre) at some falls near San Antonio, Toledo, a Mopan-majority village in Belize

The earliest description of the Mopan territory in print is attributed to the 1688 Historia de Yucathan by Diego López de Cogolludo, who credited his information to Bartolomé de Fuensalida, a Franciscan friar who himself likely first got his intelligence from a 1618 Peten Itza delegation to Tipu (then a visita mission in Spanish Yucatan). Scholarship has advanced little since then, however. As of 2009, the state of archaeological and archival research on the territory was deemed poor, with its residents described as a people who remain virtually unknown in terms of their material culture and geopolitics, barring some documentary references and linguistic reconstructions.

The former territory's residents are deemed the primary ancestors of the modern Mopan people of Belize and Guatemala.

== Notes and references ==
=== References ===
1. Atran S, Chase AF, Fedick SL, Knapp G, McKillop H, Marcus J, Schwartz NB, Webb MC (December 1993). "Itza Maya Tropical Agro-Forestry [and Comments and Replies]". Current Anthropology. 34 (5): 633–700. doi:10.1086/204212. JSTOR 2744279. S2CID 147519787.
2. Becquey C (5 December 2012). "Quelles frontières pour les populations cholanes?". Ateliers d'Anthropologie. 37 (37). doi:10.4000/ateliers.9181.
3. Beyette BJ, LeCount LJ, eds. (2017). "The Only True People": Linking Maya Identities Past and Present. Boulder, Colo.: University Press of Colorado. ISBN 9781607325673.
4. Feldman LH, ed. (2000). Lost Shores, Forgotten Peoples: Spanish Explorations of the South East Maya Lowlands. Latin America in Translation / En Traducción / Em Tradução. Durham, N. Car., and London: Duke University Press. ISBN 0822326302. OL 9874598M.
5. Graham E (2011). Maya Christians and their Churches in Sixteenth-Century Belize. Maya Studies. Gainesville, Fla.: University Press of Florida. ISBN 9780813036663.
6. Jiménez Abollado FL (January 2010). "Reducción de indios infieles en la Montaña del Chol: la expedición del Sargento Mayor Miguel Rodríguez Camilo en 1699". Estudios de Cultura Maya. 35: 91–110. ISSN 2448-5179.
7. Jones GD, ed. (1977). Anthropology and History in Yucatán. The Texas Pan American Series. Austin, Tex. and London: University of Texas Press. ISBN 0292703147. OL 18272858W.
8. Jones GD (1989). Maya Resistance to Spanish Rule: Time and History on a Colonial Frontier. Albuquerque, New Mex.: University of New Mexico Press. ISBN 082631161X. OL 2213175M.
9. Jones GD (1998). The Conquest of the Last Maya Kingdom. Stanford, Calif.: Stanford University Press. ISBN 0804733171.
10. Machault J (2018). "Organización y modalidad del intercambio a larga distancia en 'la Montaña' del Petén, siglos XVI-XVII". Indiana. 35 (1): 97–120. doi:10.18441/ind.v35i1.97-120.
11. Rice PM, Rice DS, eds. (2009). The Kowoj: Identity, Migration, and Geopolitics in Late Postclassic Petén, Guatemala. Mesoamerican Worlds. Boulder, Colo.: University Press of Colorado. ISBN 9780870819308.
12. Schwartz NB, ed. (1990). Forest Society: A Social History of Petén, Guatemala. The Ethnohistory Series. Philadelphia, Penn.: University of Pennsylvania Press. JSTOR stable/j.ctv4s7k6r.
13. Spores R, ed. (1986). Ethnohistory. Supplement to the Handbook of Middle American Indians. Vol. 4. Austin, Tex.: University of Texas Press. ISBN 0292776047. OL 18331655W.
14. Thompson AE (December 2019). Comparative Processes of Sociopolitical Development in the Foothills of the Southern Maya Mountains (PhD thesis). Albuquerque, New Mex.: University of New Mexico. OCLC 1156632404.
15. Thompson JE (1976) [first published 1970 by Univ. of Okla. Press]. Maya History and Religion. The Civilization of the American Indian. Vol. 99 (3rd printing of 1st ed.). Norman, Okla.: University of Oklahoma Press. ISBN 0806108843. OL 11114327W.
16. Thompson JE (1988) [first published 1972 by Benex Press]. The Maya of Belize: Historical Chapters Since Columbus (reprint of 1st ed.). Benque Viejo, Belize: Cubola Productions. ISBN 9686233032. OL 1792198M.
17. von Houwald GF, ed. (1979). Comentario. Nicolás de Valenzuela: Conquista del Lacandón y Conquista del Chol. Vol. 2. Berlin: Colloquium Verlag. ISBN 3767804859.
18. von Houwald GF (1984). "Mapa y Descripción de la Montaña del Petén e Ytzá: Interpretación de un documento de los años poco después de la conquista de Tayasal". Indiana. 9: 255–278. doi:10.18441/ind.v9i0.255-271.
19. Wanyerka PJ (August 2009). Classic Maya Political Organization: Epigraphic Evidence of Hierarchical Organization in the Southern Maya Mountains Region of Belize (PhD thesis). Carbondale, Ill.: Southern Illinois University. OCLC 776149169.
20. Wilk R, Chapin M (September 1988). Ethnic Minorities in Belize: Mopan, Kekchi, and Garifuna (Report). Washington, DC: US Agency for International Development. Doc ID PN-ABI-653. Archived from the original on 14 December 2024.
