= History of Belize (1506–1862) =

Belize, on the east coast of Central America, southeast of Mexico, was inhabited by the indigenous peoples who fought off the Spaniards in an attempt to preserve their heritage and to avoid the fate of their neighbors who were conquered and under Spanish rule. While this was going on, British pirates would rob Spanish merchant ships and navigate through the shallow waters and small islands even going up river later to hide their bounty. The indigenous people of Belize did not resist the British like they did the Spanish. In the 17th century, however, the British settlement became a formal British crown colony from 1862 through 1964, where they first achieved self government and later in 1981 became an independent country recognized globally with all its territory intact. The British brought along with them slaves taken from Congo and Angola during the eighteenth century.

== Pre-Columbian societies and the conquest ==
Maya were still in Belize when the Europeans came in the 16th and 17th centuries. Archaeological and ethnohistorical research confirms that several groups of Mayan peoples lived in the area now known as Belize in the 16th century.

The political geography of that period does not coincide with present-day boundaries, so several Mayan provinces lay across the frontiers of modern Belize, Mexico, and Guatemala. The Mayan province of Chetumal, for example, consisted of the northern part of present-day Belize and the southern coast of the Mexican state Quintana Roo. In the south, crossing the present-day frontier between Belize and Guatemala, were the Mopan Maya, and still farther south, the Ch'ol-speaking Manche groups. In central Belize lay the province of Dzuluinicob (the non-kuchkabal Postclassic mayan state in modern day Cayo District), meaning "land of foreigners" or "foreign people." This province stretched from New River in the north to Sittee River in the south, and from close to the present-day Guatemalan border in the west to the sea. The apparent political center of this province was Tipu, located east of modern Benque Viejo del Carmen. Lamanai, several towns on New River and on Belize River, and Xibún on Sibun River, were included in this province.

In the first decade of the 16th century, during the Pinzón–Solís voyage, Juan Díaz de Solís sailed northward along the coast of Belize to Yucatán. In 1519 Hernán Cortés conquered Mexico, and Pedro Arias Dávila founded Panama City. Spain soon sent expeditions to Guatemala and Honduras, and the conquest of Yucatán began in 1527.

When Cortés passed through the southwestern corner of present-day Belize in 1525, there were settlements of Ch'ol-speaking Manche in that area. When the Spanish "pacified" the region in the 17th century, they forcibly displaced these settlements to the Guatemalan Highlands. The Spanish launched their main incursions into the area from Yucatán, however, and encountered stiff resistance from the Mayan provinces of Chetumal and Dzuluinicob. The region became a place of refuge from the Spanish invasion, but the escaping Maya brought with them diseases that they had contracted from the Spanish. Subsequent epidemics of smallpox and yellow fever, along with endemic malaria, devastated the indigenous population.

In the 17th century, Spanish missionaries from Yucatán traveled up New River and established churches in Mayan settlements with the intention of converting and controlling these people. One such settlement was Tipu, which was excavated in the 1980s. People occupied the site during preclassic, classic, and postclassic times, and through the conquest period until 1707.

Though conquered by the Spanish in 1544, Tipu was too far from the colonial centers of power to be effectively controlled for long. Thousands of Maya fled south from Yucatán in the second half of the 16th century, and the people of Tipu rebelled against Spanish authority. Tipu was apparently too important to ignore because of its proximity to the Itzá of the Lago Petén Itzá region of present-day Guatemala. In 1618 and 1619, two Franciscans, attempting to convert the people built a church in Tipu. In 1638 Tipu began resisting Spanish authority, and by 1642, the entire province of Dzuluinicob was in a state of rebellion. The Maya abandoned eight towns at this time, and some 300 families relocated in Tipu, the center of rebellion. In the 1640s, Tipu's population totaled more than 1,000.

Piracy along the coast increased during this period. In 1642, and again in 1648, pirates sacked Salamanca de Bacalar, the seat of Spanish government in southern Yucatán. The abandonment of Bacalar ended Spanish control over the Mayan provinces of Chetumal and Dzuluinicob.

Between 1638 and 1695, the Maya living in the area of Tipu enjoyed autonomy from Spanish rule. But in 1696, Spanish soldiers used Tipu as a base from which they subdued the area and supported missionary activities. In 1697 the Spanish conquered the Itzá, and in 1707, the Spanish forcibly resettled the inhabitants of Tipu to the area near Lago Petén Itzá. The political center of the Mayan province of Dzuluinicob ceased to exist at the time that British colonists were becoming increasingly interested in settling the area.

== Colonial rivalry between Spain and Britain ==
In the 16th and 17th centuries, Spain tried to maintain a monopoly on trade and colonization in its New World colonies, but northern European powers were increasingly attracted to the region by the potential for trade and settlement. These powers resorted to smuggling, piracy, and war in their efforts to challenge and then destroy Spain's monopoly. Early in the 17th century, the Dutch, English, and French encroached in areas where Spain was weak: the small islands of the Lesser Antilles, the no-man's-land of the Guianas between the Spanish and Portuguese dominions, and the uncharted coasts of Yucatán and Central America. Later in the 17th century, England effectively challenged Spain in the western Caribbean, capturing Jamaica in 1655 and subsequently using this base to support settlements all the along the Caribbean coast from the Yucatán to Nicaragua.

Early in the 17th century, on the shores of the Bay of Campeche in southeastern Mexico and on the Yucatán Peninsula, English buccaneers began cutting logwood, which was used to produce a dye needed by the wool industry. According to legend, one of these buccaneers, Peter Wallace, called "Ballis" by the Spanish, settled nearby and gave his name to the Belize River, as early as 1638. (Other sources, however, assert that the river's name comes from the Mayan word belix, meaning muddy-watered.) English buccaneers began to use the tortuous coastline of the area as a base from which to attack Spanish ships. Some of the buccaneers may have been refugees expelled by the Spanish in 1641–42 from settlements on islands off the coasts of Nicaragua and Honduras. Buccaneers stopped plundering Spanish logwood ships and started cutting their own wood in the 1650s and 1660s. Logwood extraction then became the main reason for the English settlement for more than a century.

A 1667 treaty, in which the European powers agreed to suppress piracy, encouraged the shift from buccaneering to cutting logwood and led to more permanent settlement. The 1670 Godolphin Treaty between Spain and England confirmed English possession of countries and islands in the Western Hemisphere that England already occupied. Unfortunately, those colonies were not named and ownership of the coastal area between Yucatán and Nicaragua remained unclear. Conflict continued between Britain and Spain, over the right of the British to cut logwood and to settle in the region. In 1717 Spain expelled British logwood cutters from the Bay of Campeche west of the Yucatán. This action had the unintended effect of enhancing the significance of the growing British settlement near the Belize River.

The first British settlers lived a rough and disorderly life. According to Captain Nathaniel Uring, who was shipwrecked and forced to live with the logwood cutters for several months in 1720, the British were "generally a rude drunken Crew, some of which have been Pirates." He said he had "but little Comfort living among these Crew of ungovernable Wretches, where was little else to be heard but Blasphemy, Cursing and Swearing."

During the 18th century, the Spanish attacked the British settlers repeatedly. In 1717, 1730, 1754, and 1779 the Spanish forced the British to leave the area. The Spanish never settled in the region, however, and the British always returned to expand their trade and settlement. At the end of the Seven Years' War in 1763, the Treaty of Paris conceded to Britain the right to cut and export logwood but asserted Spanish sovereignty over the territory. Still, there was never an agreement on the precise area in which logwood cutters could operate. The Spanish frontier town of Bacalar in the Yucatán, refounded in 1730 after having been deserted for almost a century, became a base for operations against the British. When war broke out again in 1779, the commandant of Bacalar led a successful expedition against the British settlement, which was abandoned until the Treaty of Versailles in 1783 again allowed the British to cut logwood in the area between the Hondo and Belize rivers. By that time, however, the logwood trade had declined and mahogany had become the chief export, so the settlers petitioned for a new agreement.

== Beginnings of self-government and the plantocracy ==
The British were reluctant to set up any formal government for the settlement for fear of provoking the Spanish. On their own initiative and without recognition by the British government, the settlers had begun annual elections of magistrates to establish common law for the settlement as early as 1738. In 1765 Rear Admiral Sir William Burnaby, commander-in-chief of Jamaica, arrived in the settlement and codified and expanded their regulations into a document known as Burnaby's Code. When the settlers began returning to the area in 1784, the governor of Jamaica named Colonel Edward Marcus Despard as superintendent to oversee the settlement of Belize on the Bay of Honduras.

The Convention of London, signed in 1786, allowed the British settlers, known as Baymen, to cut and export logwood and mahogany from the Hondo River in the north southward to the Sibun River. The convention, however, did not allow the Baymen to build any fortifications, establish any form of government, military or civil, or develop plantation agriculture. Spain retained sovereignty over the area and asserted the right to inspect the settlement twice a year.

The convention also required Britain to evacuate its settlement on the Mosquito Coast (Costa de Mosquitos) in eastern Nicaragua and western Honduras. Over 2,000 of these settlers and their slaves arrived in 1787 in the settlement of Belize, reinforcing the British presence. The new settlers greatly increased the population, and moreover soon found themselves in considerable tension with the older settlers over questions of land rights and status.

The last Spanish attack on the British settlement, the Battle of St. George's Caye, occurred two years after the war broke out in 1796. Field Marshal Arturo O'Neill, the Spanish governor general of Yucatán, commanded a flotilla of some thirty vessels with some 500 sailors and 2,000 troops and attacked the British colonists in 1798. During several brief engagements culminating in a two-and-a-half-hour battle on September 10, the British drove off the Spanish. The attack marked Spain's last attempt to control the territory or dislodge the British.

Despite treaties banning local government and plantation agriculture, both activities flourished. In the late 18th century, an oligarchy of relatively wealthy settlers controlled the political economy of the British settlement. These settlers claimed about four-fifths of the land available under the Convention of London, through resolutions, called location laws, which they passed in the Public Meeting, the name given to the first legislature. These same men also owned about half of all the slaves in the settlement; controlled imports, exports, and the wholesale and retail trades; and determined taxation. A group of magistrates, whom they elected from among themselves, had executive as well as judicial functions, despite a prohibition on executive action.

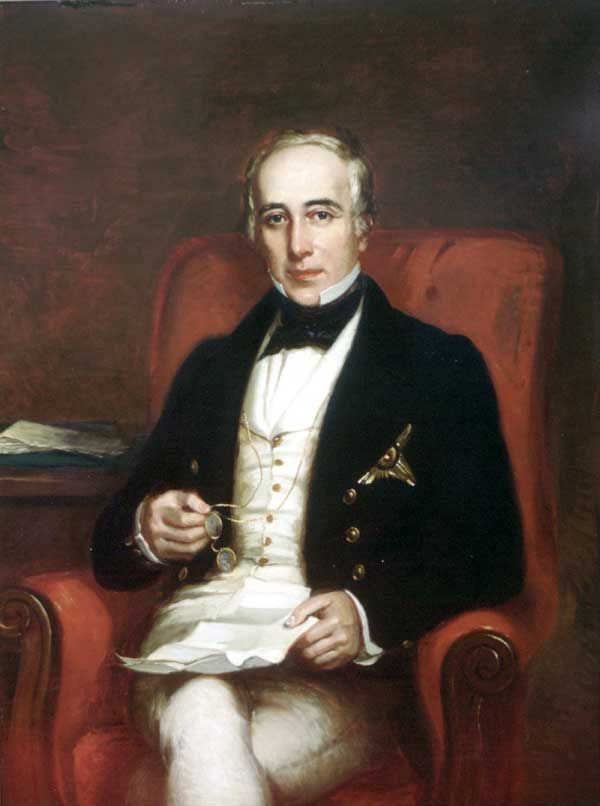
George Arthur, Superintendent of British Honduras

The landowners resisted any challenge to their growing political power. Colonel Edward Marcus Despard, the first superintendent appointed by the governor of Jamaica in 1784, was suspended in 1789 when the wealthy cutters challenged his authority. When Superintendent George Arthur attacked what he called the "monopoly on the part of the monied cutters" in 1816, he was only partially successful in breaking their monopoly on landholding. He proclaimed that all unclaimed land was henceforth crown land that could be granted only by the crown's representative but continued to allow the existing monopoly of landownership.

== Slavery in the settlement, 1724–1825 ==
Cutting logwood was a simple, small-scale operation, but the settlers imported slaves to help with the work. Slavery in the settlement was associated with the extraction of timber, first logwood and then mahogany, as treaties forbade the production of plantation crops. This difference in economic function gave rise to variations in the organization, conditions, and treatment of slaves. The earliest reference to African slaves in the British settlement appeared in a 1724 Spanish missionary's account, which stated that the British recently had been importing them from Jamaica and Bermuda. In the second half of the eighteenth century the slave population hovered around 3,000, making up about three-quarters of the total population. Most slaves, even if they were brought through West Indian markets, were born in Africa, probably from around the Bight of Biafra, the Congo, and Angola—the principal sources of British slaves in the late 18th century. The Eboe (Ibo) seem to have been particularly numerous; one section of Belize Town was known as Eboe Town in the first half of the 19th century. At first, many slaves maintained African ethnic identifications and cultural practices. Gradually, however, the process of assimilation was creating a new, synthetic Creole culture.

Whites, although a minority in the settlement, monopolized power and wealth by dominating the chief economic activities. trade and timber. They also controlled the first legislature and the judicial and administrative institutions. As a result, British settlers had a disproportionate influence on the development of the Creole culture. Anglican, Baptist, and Methodist missionaries helped devalue and suppress African cultural heritage.

Cutting timber was seasonal work that required workers to spend several months isolated in temporary makeshift camps in the forest, away from families in Belize Town. Settlers needed only one or two slaves to cut logwood, a small tree that grows in clumps near the coast. But as the trade shifted to mahogany in the last quarter of the 18th century, the settlers needed more money, land, and slaves for larger-scale operations. After 1770 about 80 percent of all male slaves aged ten years or more cut timber. Huntsmen found the trees, which were then cut, trimmed, and hauled to the riverside. During the rainy season, settlers and slaves floated rafts of untrimmed logs downriver, where the wood was processed for shipment. Huntsmen were highly skilled and valued slaves, as were the axmen who cut the trees while standing on a springy platform four to five meters high. Another group of slaves cared for the oxen that pulled the huge logs to the river. Others trimmed the trees and cleared the tracks. The use of small gangs of slaves for cutting wood reduced the need for close supervision; whip-wielding slavedrivers, who were ubiquitous on large plantations elsewhere, were unknown in the settlement.

The colonial masters used domestic slaves, mostly women and children, to clean their houses, sew, wash and iron their clothes, prepare and serve their food, and raise their children. Some slaves cultivated provisions that would either be sold or used to save their owners some of the cost of importing food. Other slaves worked as sailors, blacksmiths, nurses, and bakers. Young people started work by waiting on their masters' tables, where they were taught to obey, then most of the young women continued in domestic work while the young men became woodcutters. This rigid division of labor and the narrow range of work experience of most slaves limited their opportunities after legal emancipation in 1838.

The slaves' experience, though different from that on plantations in other colonies in the region, was nevertheless oppressive. They were frequently the objects of "extreme inhumanity", as a report published in 1820 stated. The settlement's chaplain reported "instances, many instances, of horrible barbarity" against the slaves. The slaves' own actions, including suicide, abortion, murder, escape, and revolt, suggest how they viewed their situation. Slaves who lived in small, scattered, and remote groups could escape with relative ease if they were willing to leave their families. In the 18th century, many escaped to Yucatán, and in the early 19th century a steady flow of runaways went to Guatemala and down the coast to Honduras. Some runaways established communities, such as one near Sibun River, that offered refuge to others. When freedom could be attained by slipping into the bush, revolt was not such a pressing option. Nevertheless, numerous slave revolts took place. The last revolt in 1820, led by two black slaves, Will and Sharper, involved a considerable number of well-armed individuals who "had been treated with very unnecessary harshness by their Owner, and had certainly good grounds for complaint."

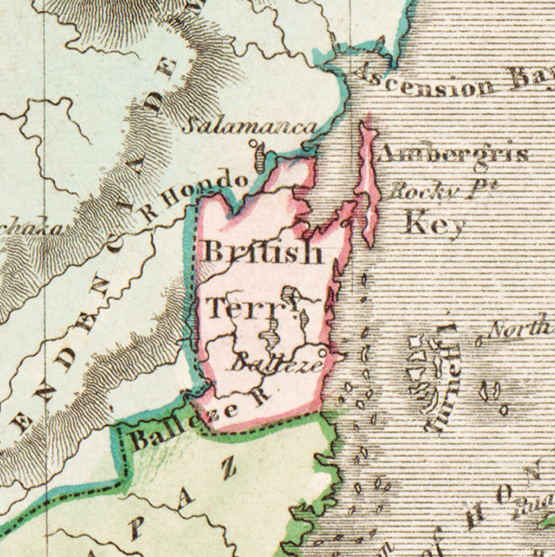
Detail of Belize from Daniel Lizars' 1831 map

One way the settler minority maintained its control was by dividing the slaves from the growing population of free Creole people who were given limited privileges. Though some Creoles were legally free, they could neither hold commissions in the military nor act as jurors or magistrates, and their economic activities were restricted. They could vote in elections only if they had owned more property and lived in the area longer than whites. Privileges, however, led many free blacks to stress their loyalty and acculturation to British ways. When officials in other colonies of the British West Indies began giving free blacks expanded legal rights, the Colonial Office threatened to dissolve the Baymen's Public Meeting unless it followed suit. The "Coloured Subjects of Free Condition" were granted civil rights on July 5, 1831, a few years before the abolition of slavery was completed.

The essence of society, a rigidly hierarchical system in which people were ranked according to race and class was well established by the time of full emancipation in 1838. The act to abolish slavery throughout the British colonies, passed in 1833, was intended to avoid drastic social changes by effecting emancipation over a five-year transition period. The act included two generous measures for slave owners: a system of "apprenticeship" calculated to extend their control over the former slaves who were to continue to work for their masters without pay, and compensation for the former slave owners for their loss of property. These measures helped ensure that the majority of the population, even when it was legally freed after apprenticeship ended in 1838, depended on their former owners for work. These owners still monopolized the land. Before 1838, a handful of the inhabitants controlled the settlement and owned most of the people. After 1838, the masters of the settlement, a tiny elite, continued to control the country for over a century by denying access to land, and by promoting economic dependency of the freed slaves through a combination of wage advances and company stores.

== Emigration of the Garifuna ==
A new ethnic group—the Garifuna—appeared in the early 19th century, at the time when the settlement was grappling with the ramifications of the end of slavery. The Garifuna, descendants of Carib peoples of the Lesser Antilles and of Africans who had escaped from slavery, had resisted British and French colonialism in the Lesser Antilles until they were defeated by the British in 1796. After putting down a violent Garifuna rebellion on Saint Vincent, the British moved between 1,700 and 5,000 of the Garifuna across the Caribbean to the Bay Islands (present-day Islas de la Bahía) off the north coast of Honduras. From there they migrated to the Caribbean coasts of Nicaragua, Honduras, Guatemala, and the southern part of present-day Belize. By 1802 about 150 Garifuna had settled in the Stann Creek (present-day Dangriga) area and were engaged in fishing and farming.

Other Garifuna later came to the British settlement of Belize after finding themselves on the wrong side in a civil war in Honduras in 1832. Many Garifuna men soon found wage work alongside slaves as mahogany cutters. In 1841 Dangriga, the Garifuna's largest settlement, was a flourishing village. The American traveler John Stephens described the Garifuna village of Punta Gorda as having 500 inhabitants and producing a wide variety of fruits and vegetables.

The British treated Garifuna as squatters. In 1857 the British told the Garifuna that they must obtain leases from the crown or risk losing their lands, dwellings, and other buildings. The 1872 Crown Lands Ordinance established reservations for the Garifuna as well as the Maya. The British prevented both groups from owning land and treated them as a source of valuable labor.

== Constitutional developments, 1850–1862 ==
Flag of British Honduras, 1870–1919

Flag of British Honduras/Belize, 1919–1981

In the 1850s, the power struggle between the superintendent and the planters coincided with events in international diplomacy to produce major constitutional changes. In the Clayton–Bulwer Treaty of 1850, Britain and the United States agreed to promote the construction of a canal across Central America and to refrain from colonizing any part of Central America. The British government interpreted the colonization clause as applying only to any future occupation. But the United States government claimed that Britain was obliged to evacuate the area, particularly after 1853, when President Franklin Pierce's expansionist administration stressed the Monroe Doctrine. Britain yielded on the Bay Islands and the Mosquito Coast in eastern Nicaragua. But in 1854, Britain produced a formal constitution establishing a legislative for its possession of the settlement in present-day Belize.

The Legislative Assembly of 1854 was to have eighteen elected members, each of whom was to have at least £400 sterling worth of property. The assembly was also to have three official members appointed by the superintendent. The fact that voters had to have property yielding an income of £7 a year or a salary of a £100 a year reinforced the restrictive nature of this legislature. The superintendent could defer or dissolve the assembly at any time, originate legislation, and give or withhold consent to bills. This situation suggested that the legislature was more a chamber of debate than a place where decisions were made. The Colonial Office in London became, therefore, the real political-administrative power in the settlement. This shift in power was reinforced when in 1862, the Settlement of Belize in the Bay of Honduras was declared a British colony called British Honduras, and the crown's representative was elevated to a lieutenant governor, subordinate to the governor of Jamaica.

== See also ==
- Spanish period of Belize – historical survey covering 1500–1638
