= San Luis, Guatemala =

San Luis
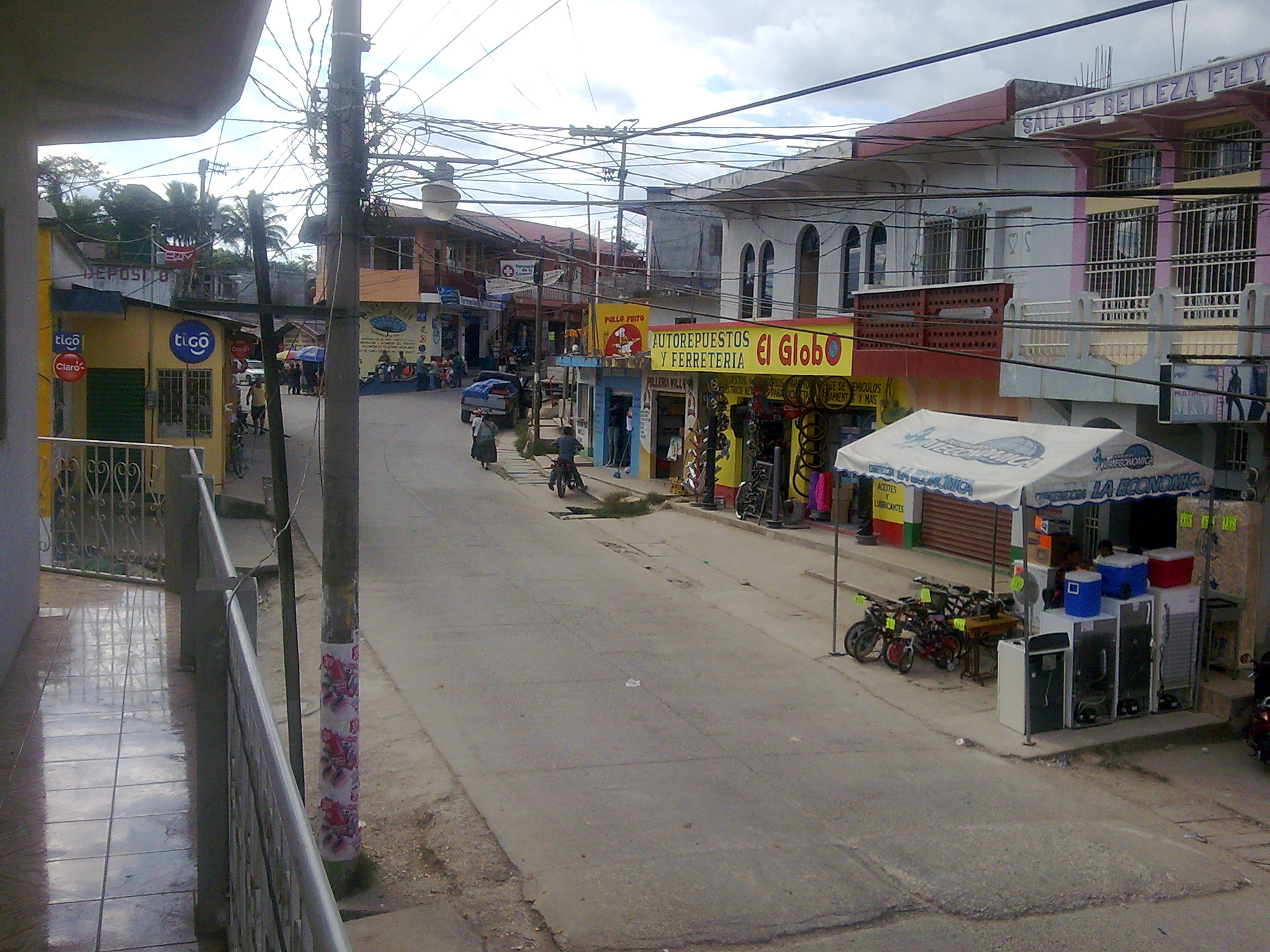
- San Luis, El Petén (2009)

- Location in Guatemala
- Coordinates: 16°11′56″N 89°26′25″W
- Country: Guatemala
- Department: El Petén

San Luis is a municipality in the El Petén department of Guatemala. The municipality is rectangular and covers approximately 2,915 km^{2}. It contains 44,903 people. There are about 140 hamlets in the municipality, with the capital being the pueblo of San Luis itself.

== Overview ==
Its economy is primarily of agriculture, but also contains minor manufacturing services like personalised furniture and custom building services. The pueblo itself consists of several neighbourhoods, including El Centro, Tikajal, Bethel, Vista Hermosa, La Florida, El Estadio, La Cruce and El Paraiso. It contains a public school in every neighbourhood and is home to a few private schools, including Centro Maya Asuncion, a school for Mayan teenaged adolescent females from remote villages. It is administered by Jesus Claros Aliaraza and the Catholic community is represented by the Comboni Missionaries. Though it is surrounded by steep and hilly forests, deforestation remains the problem of the degradation for the surrounding environment.

Languages spoken in San Luis include Spanish, Q'eqchi', and Mopan Maya.
