= Postclassic period in Belize =

Historical period in Belize, 900–1500

Coordinates: 17.0°N 88.5°W

Postclassic
- 900–1500
Classic	Spanish
- Location: Belize
- Including: Early (to 1200); Late (to 1500)
- Monarch: None
- Leader: Unknown
- Key events: Growth of maritime trade; emergence of non-monarchical states

The Postclassic period of Belizean, Maya, and Mesoamerican history began with the completion of the Classic Maya collapse in AD 900, and ended with the arrival of the Spanish in 1500. The period was originally conceived as that which followed the Classic apogee of Maya civilisation, that is, 'as a decline from the Classic peak of civilisation, a time marked by decadence rather than an era of continued development.' It is now thought of as a time of political, social, and economic transformation or revival. (Note: The Postclassic period is variously dated in literature. See Periodisation of the history of Belize for further discussion.)

== Geography ==
During the pre-Columbian era, Belize formed part of the central and southern Maya Lowlands of the Maya Region of Mesoamerica.

== History ==
Though the political vacuum of the Classic collapse is thought to have given prompt rise to new regimes, the 'advent of the Early Postclassic era is not fully understood [as of 2021] and has been referred to as a "dark age."' The Late Postclassic, on the other hand, is thought to have been a period of prosperity across the Lowlands.

== Demographics ==
The demographic effects of the Classic collapse, principally urban flight, which 'resulted in the almost total abandonment of the [L]owlands by the beginning of the Early Postclassic period,' are thought to have 'extend[ed] well into the Early Postclassic period, possibly until 1250.' Santa Rita, for instance, likely began the Postclassic with some 1,000 to 2,000 residents, but saw its population triple to some 7,000 in circa 1300 due to its increasing prominence as the port of Chetumal.

== Technology ==
The Postclassic is partially characterised 'by the appearance of metallrugy,' as cast metal 'becomes a heavily traded good' in the market, with gold from southern Central America and copper from west Mexico.

== Economy ==
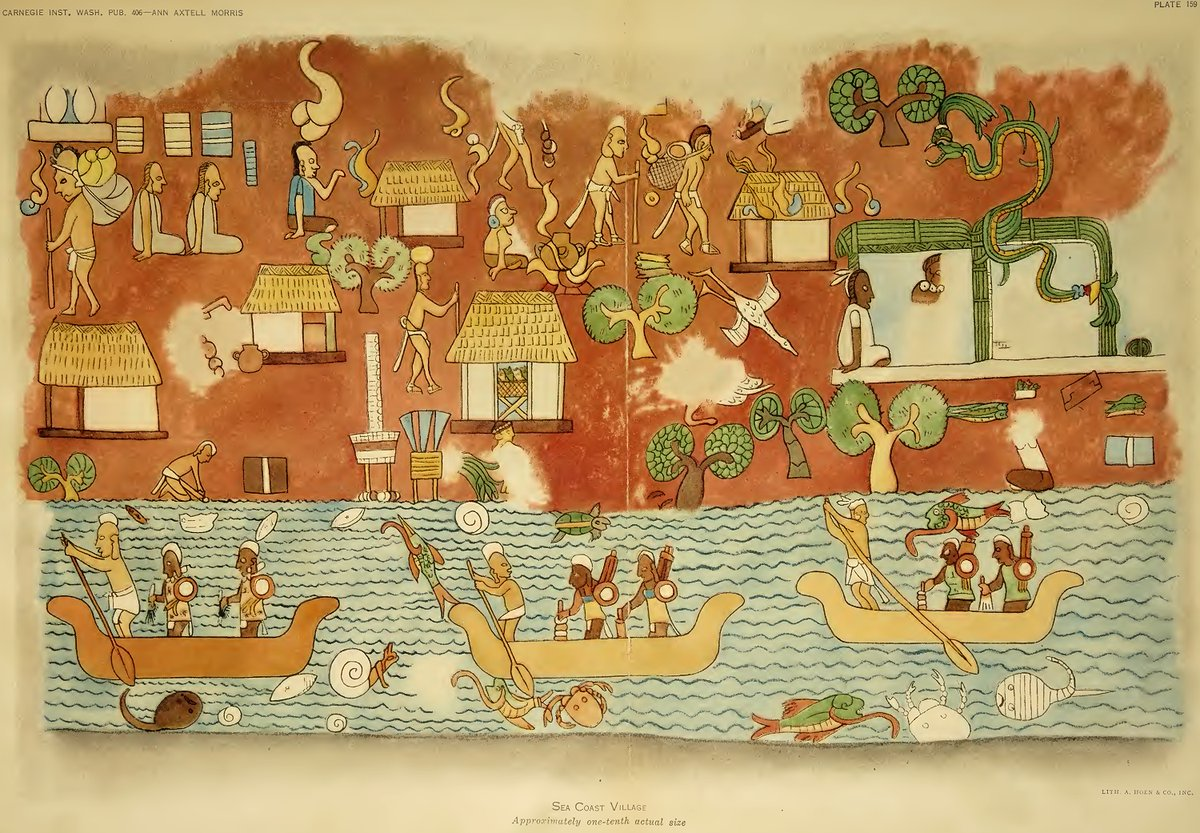
Sea Coast Village / 1931 fresco by A Morris of Chichen Itza mural / via HathiTrust

The Postclassic brought about the expansion or intensification of the circum-peninsular maritime trade, 'based on the more efficient bulk transport of commodities by large seagoing canoes,' in addition to 'continued population growth throughout Mesoamerica,' the introduction of 'a variety of new products, such as metal objects, [...] to new markets,' 'increases in volume and efficiency of both production and transport' of goods, and the trading interests of the regional Postclassic powers, Chichen Itza and Mayapan. (Note: For instance, the introduction of standardised ceramic moulds allowed for the mass production and efficient shipping and handling of pottery, resulting in decreased costs (Sharer & Traxler 2006, p. 605).) Belize and eastern Yucatan were 'a major producer of honey, beeswax, and manufactured products such as pottery,' while their ports served as 'a major link for the sea routes around the peninsula.' For instance, the capital of Chetumal is thought to have been '[o]ne of the most important ports on the Caribbean coast,' while excavations upriver at Lamanai have unearthed Postclassic 'pottery, incense burners, and objects of both gold and copper that represent its trade connections with Yucatan, Central Mexico, and even Central America,' and work across the bay at the Marco Gonzalez port have revealed particular Postclassic emphasis on transhipment of obsidian from Ixtepeque, in the Maya Highlands. (Note: The Chetumal port is thought to have exported the province's considerable cacao stock, and to have imported salt and textiles for riverine and inland trade, and feathers and copper for maritime trade, among other goods (Sharer & Traxler 2006, p. 610).)

Commercial growth is further attributed to the absence of the state's regulation of labour, and the production and consumption of prestige goods, such as obsidian, in the Early Postclassic.

== Society ==
The growth of maritime trade in the Postclassic, which would have required a growing number of full-time occupational specialists (like merchants, beekeepers, potters), is thought to have spurred the expansion of the middle class, that is, of wealthy commoners.

Postclassic religious practice is thought to have been less centralised and more private, as compared to Classic practice. In particular, the Classic 'huge public spectacles' are thought to have given way to smaller rituals on family shrines, and private pilgrimages, in the Postclassic. Ritual activity is thought to have endured into the Early Postclassic at Xunantunich, for instance, possibly due specifically to its antiquity. The Postclassic ubiquity of incense burners, in particular, is thought to signal wider participation in religious ritual, given it was now a small, private affair.

== Government ==
With the Classic fall of divine sovereigns and abolition of absolute monarchy, the Postclassic saw 'a return to more collective governance.'

== Sites ==
Postclassic sites in Belize and surrounding Lowlands / select sites only / Tipu+ = Chan, Tipu / via 2010 Witschey & Brown

Postclassic sites in central and southern Belize have been more technically difficult to locate and identify than those in northern Belize. In addition to sites with evidence of occupation (settlements), sites with evidence of ritual activity (pilgrimage points) are also seen in the Postclassic, such as Cahal Pech, Chan, and Xunantunich in Cayo, and La Milpa in Orange Walk.

Prominent excavated sites in Belize with Postclassic artefacts, material, or structures. (Note: Not including various unnamed or minor Postclassic sites.)
Name	Location	Size	Notes
Akab Mucil	Orange Walk	Small	—N/a
Barton Ramie	Cayo	Small	—N/a
Buenavista	Cayo	Large	—N/a
Cahal Pech	Cayo	Large	—N/a
Chan	Cayo	Small	—N/a
Colha	Orange Walk	Small	—N/a
Ek Xux	Toledo	Small	—N/a
Honey Camp Lagoon	Orange Walk	Small	cf (Note: Also known as Laguna de On.)
La Milpa	Orange Walk	Large	—N/a
Laguna Seca	Corozal	Small	—N/a
Lamanai	Orange Walk	Large	—N/a
Marco Gonzalez	Belize	Small	—N/a
Muklebal Tzul	Toledo	Small	—N/a
Nohmul	Orange Walk	Small	—N/a
Progresso Lagoon	Corozal	Small	—N/a
Santa Rita	Corozal	Small	cf (Note: Possibly Chetumal, port and capital of the eponymous province.)
Tipu	Cayo	Small	cf (Note: Capital of the Dzuluinicob province.)
Xunantunich	Cayo	Large	—N/a

== Scholarship ==
Myths and stigmas of the Postclassic persist, including that the Maya completely disappeared and that the Postclassic Maya were declining, decaying, decadent, and depopulated.

— Adam, Ren & Valdez, RRBA (2023)

As of 2023, the Postclassic remains 'one of the least understood time periods of the ancient Maya' in Belize, given Mayanist focus on 'larger sites with monumental architecture [Mayapan and Chichen Itza],' and on the Classic collapse; technical difficulties locating and identifying Postclassic remains; and an ethnohistorical conception of the Postclassic as being 'less important' than the Classic, and of Belize as being 'a backwater for Maya archaeology.' Nonetheless, work on 'recognisabl[y] Postclassic materials' began by at least 1900 with Thomas Gann's study of Santa Rita.

== See also ==
- Mesoamerican chronology – survey of Mesoamerican history by period
- History of the Maya civilisation – survey of Maya history by period

== Notes and references ==
=== References ===
1. Badillo MM, Ku R, Smith P, eds. (2023). Research Reports in Belizean Archaeology. Vol. 18. Belmopan, Cayo: Institute of Archaeology. ISBN 978-976-8264-25-1. Archived from the original on 8 December 2024.
2. Chase AF, Rice PM, eds. (1985). The Lowland Maya Postclassic (1st ed.). Austin, Texas: University of Texas Press. pp. 59–60. doi:10.7560/746435. ISBN 0-292-74643-1.
3. Graham E (2011). Maya Christians and Their Churches in Sixteenth-Century Belize (1st ed.). Gainesville, Florida: University Press of Florida. ISBN 978-0-8130-3666-3. LCCN 2011011290.
4. Morris J, Jones S, Awe J, Helmke C, eds. (2008). Research Reports in Belizean Archaeology. Vol. 5. Belmopan, Cayo: Institute of Archaeology. ISBN 978-976-8197-21-4.
5. Okoshi T, Chase AF, Nondedeo P, Arnauld MC, eds. (2021). Maya Kingship: Rupture and Transformation from Classic to Postclassic Times. Maya Studies (1st ed.). Gainesville, Florida: University Press of Florida. ISBN 9780813057699. LCCN 2020037886.
6. Sharer RJ, Traxler LP, eds. (2006) [First published 1946 by SUP]. The Ancient Maya (6th ed.). Stanford, California: Stanford University Press. hdl:2027/mdp.39015062626216. ISBN 0-8047-4816-0. OCLC 57577446.
7. Witschey WR, Brown CT (2010). The Electronic Atlas of Ancient Maya Sites (Map). [vars scales]. Corvallis, Oregon: Heidi Hausman & Conservation Biology Institute.
