= New River (Belize) =

Coordinates: 18°20′N 88°22′W

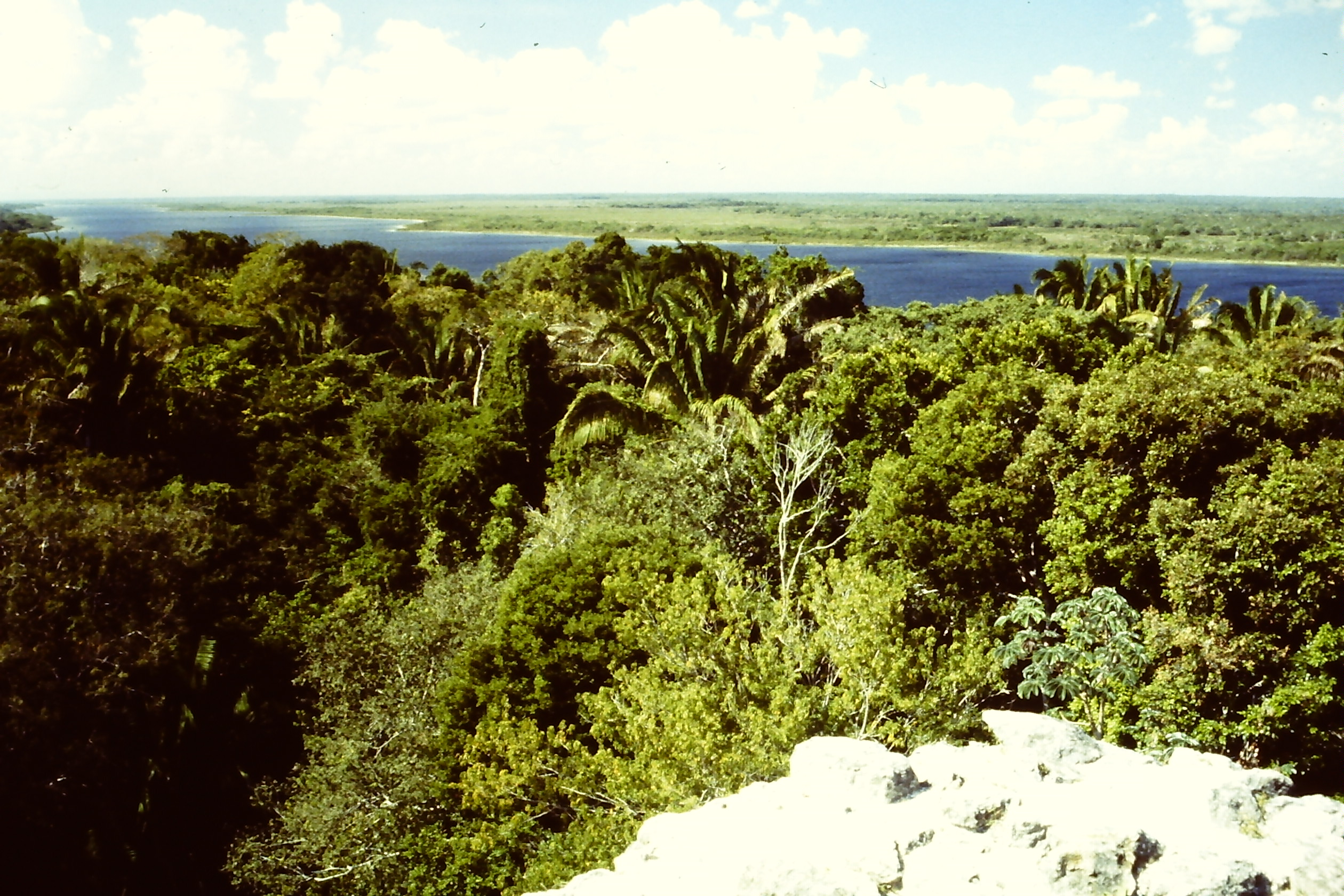
- View from Lamanai High Temple to New River
- Interactive map highlighting the New River

Physical characteristics
- Length: 132 km (82 mi)

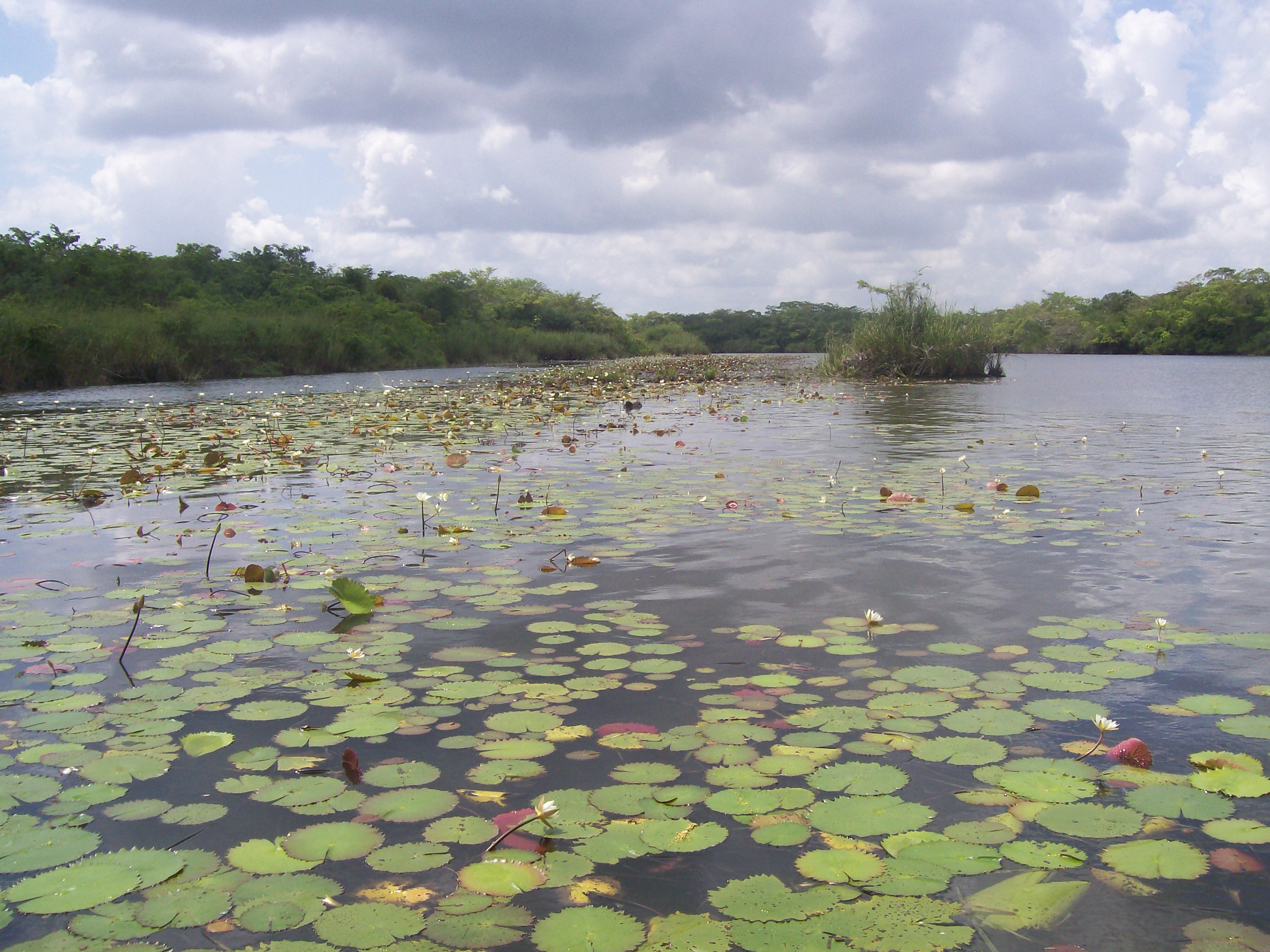
New River, Belize

The New River, also Río Nuevo, is a river in northern Belize. As the longest river that is entirely confined to Belize, it drains primarily the eastern part of the Orange Walk District during its north-northeasterly course and empties into the Chetumal Bay. The river also forms the New River Lagoon, the largest body of fresh water in Belize, just east of the Maya temples of Lamanai. The New River is a habitat for numerous types of fish and birds, as well as Morelet's crocodiles.

== Biodiversity ==
The New River is host to a diverse array of wildlife including freshwater fish, birds, turtles and Morelet's crocodiles. Among the species of turtle native to the river is the critically endangered Hickatee.

== Tours ==
Boat tours are available from several sources. Tours of Lamanai use the river as transportation to reach the site.

== Pollution ==
Sugarcane production along with other factors has caused large amounts of industrial and agricultural runoff to enter the New River since at least the mid 1900s. The pollution caused health issues in the rivers Morelet's crocodiles. In 2019 eutrophication began in the river due to the pollution. The eutrophication caused mass die-offs in the rivers fish populations and posed a health risk for people living near the river, including in the La Inmaculada RC School where students faced health issues and had their classes suspended. Mass die-offs of fish in the river continued into 2021.
