= Tipu, Belize =

Maya archaeological site in Belize

Tipu
- Tipuj; Negroman
- Location within Belize
- 17.07951°N 89.08030°W
- Type: Settlement
- Periods: Postclassic to Spanish colonial
- Cultures: Maya
- Location: Cayo, Belize
- Region: Maya Lowlands

History
- Abandoned: 1707 (by reduccion)
- Events: 1543–1544 Pachecos entrada; 1638 Tipu Rebellion

Tipu is a Mayan archaeological site in the Maya Mountains near the Belize–Guatemala border. This site is situated near the Macal River. Further downstream is located the Maya site of Chaa Creek. Slightly further downstream is the site of Cahal Pech. In Spanish colonial times, Tipu is thought to have played a major role in delaying the conquest of Peten.

== Notes and references ==
=== Full citations ===
1. "Early History of Belize".
2. "C.Michael Hogan, Chaa Creek, Megalithic Portal, ed. A. Burnham, 2007".
3. "Distribution of Early Middle Formative Period Sites". Archived from the original on 20 February 2003.
4. Shwartz, Norman B. (1990). Forest society : a social history of Petén, Guatemala. Ethnohistory series. Philadelphia, PA: University of Pennsylvania Press. ISBN 0812282485. OCLC 21974298.
