= Blue Creek =

Blue Creek may refer to the following:

== Belize ==
- Blue Creek (Belize), a river
- Blue Creek, Orange Walk, a Mennonite settlement in Orange Walk District
- Blue Creek, Toledo, a village in Toledo District
- Blue Creek Rainforest Preserve, a small rainforest nature preserve

== United States ==
=== Communities ===
- Blue Creek, Ohio, an unincorporated community
- Blue Creek, Utah, a ghost town
- Blue Creek Township, Adams County, Indiana
- Blue Creek Township, Ohio

=== Streams ===
- Blue Creek (California)
- Blue Creek (Gunnison River tributary), Colorado
- Blue Creek (Chattahoochee River tributary), Georgia
- Blue Creek (Owyhee River tributary), Idaho
- Blue Creek (Michigan)
- Blue Creek (Conrad Creek tributary), Missouri
- Blue Creek (West Virginia)

=== Other ===
- Blue Creek Conservation Area, Whitehouse, Ohio
- Blue Creek Valley, the site of Blue Creek, Utah
