= Union Township, Bollinger County, Missouri =

Union Township
- Township
- Coordinates: 37°32′50″N 090°03′50″W
- Country: United States
- State: Missouri
- County: Bollinger

Area
  - Total: 56.99 sq mi (147.61 km^{2})
  - Land: 56.96 sq mi (147.53 km^{2})
  - Water: 0.031 sq mi (0.08 km^{2}) 0.05%
- Elevation: 712 ft (217 m)

Population (2010)
  - Total: 1,058
  - Density: 101.2/sq mi (39.07/km^{2})
- FIPS code: 29-74518
- GNIS feature ID: 0766326

Union Township is one of eight townships in Bollinger County, Missouri, USA. As of the 2000 U.S. census, its population was 1,035. As of the 2010 U.S. census, the population had increased to 1,058. Union Township covers an area of 56.99 square miles (147.6 km^{2}).

Union Township was established in 1848.

== Demographics ==
As of the 2010 U.S. census, there were 1,058 people living in the township. The population density was 24.28 inhabitants per square mile (9.37/km^{2}). There were 497 housing units in the township. The racial makeup of the township was 96.03% White, 1.70% Black or African American, 0.57% Native American, 0.19% Asian, 0.19% from other races, and 1.32% from two or more races. Approximately 0.28% of the population were Hispanic or Latino of any race.

== Geography ==
=== Incorporated areas ===
The township contains no incorporated settlements.

=== Unincorporated areas ===
The township contains the unincorporated areas and historical communities of Alliance, Hurricane, North Patton, Patton, and Patton Junction.

=== Cemeteries ===
The township contains two cemeteries: Johnson and Pleasant Hill.

=== Streams ===
The streams of Baltimore Creek, Blue Creek, Buck Creek, Cape Creek, Conrad Creek, Goose Creek, Grounds Creek, Little Whitewater Creek, and Stannett Creek flow through Union Township. Other bodies of water located in the township include the Whitewater River, Destitute Acres Lake, Fulton Lake, and Grindstaff Lake.

=== Landmarks ===
- Amidon Memorial Conservation Area
- Little Whitewater Conservation Area

== Administrative districts ==
=== School districts ===
- Meadow Heights R-II School District

=== Political Districts ===
- Missouri's 8th Congressional District
- State House District 145
- State Senate District 27
