= Belize–Mexico border =

International border

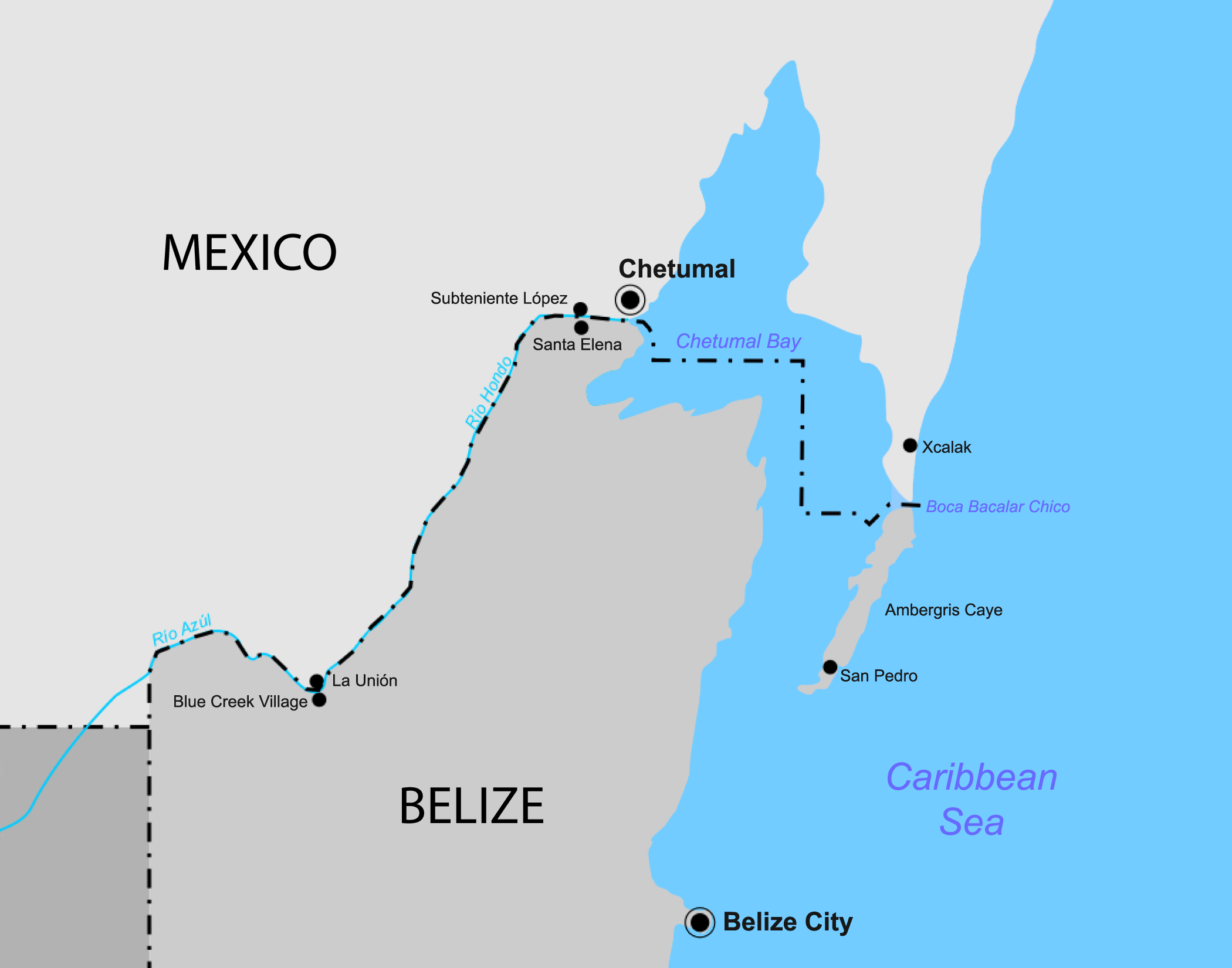
A map of the Belize–Mexico border.

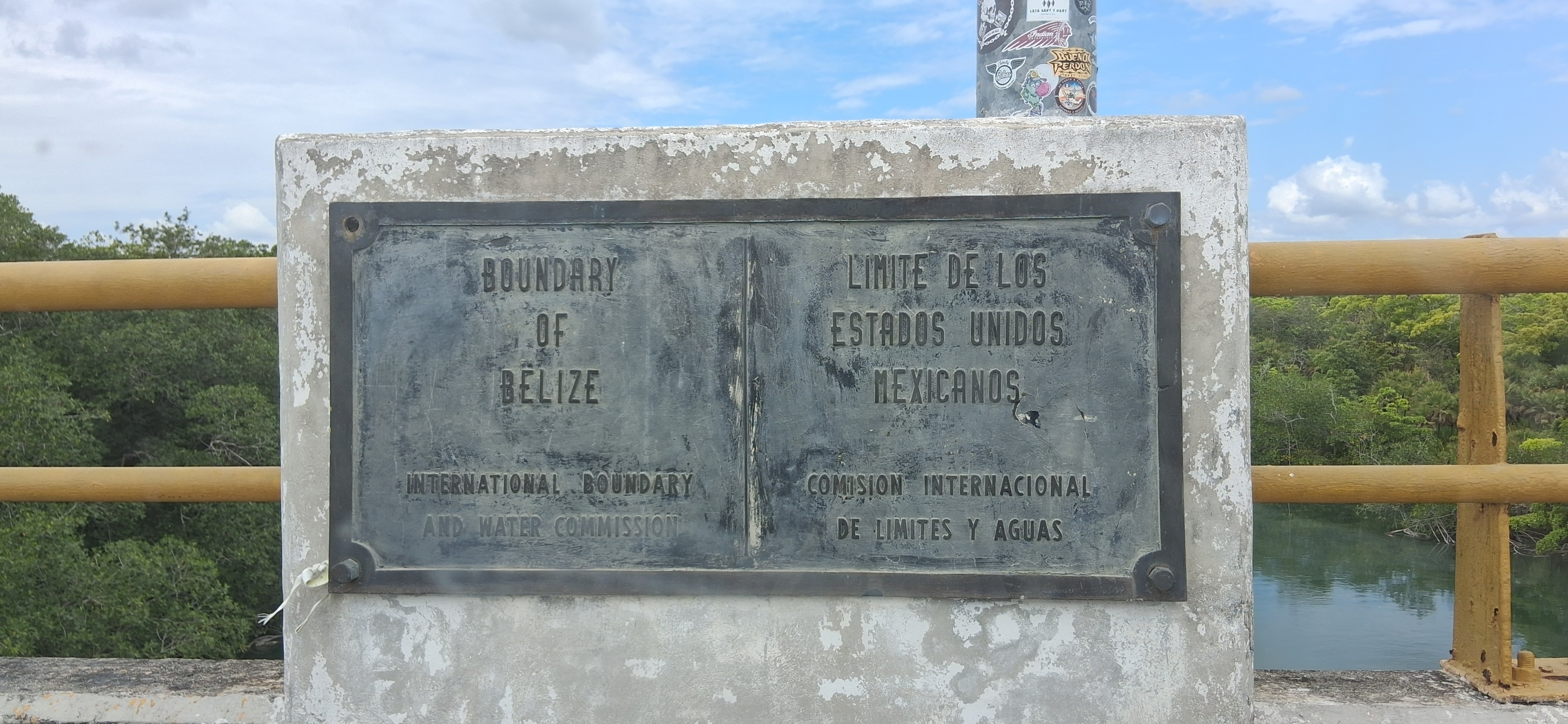
A sign marking the border crossing between Mexico and Belize.

The international border between Belize and Mexico is 250 km (160 mi) long and almost exclusively follows the course of the Hondo River. It separates Belize from the Mexican state of Quintana Roo.

The modern boundary was agreed to in 1893, and finalized in 1897.

== History ==
The border between Mexico and Belize was difficult to explore because of its remote location, specifically for the Mexican territory. Because of the region's sparse population, the British colony of British Honduras, now Belize, was able to occupy the region. However, Mexico did not recognize British possession of the territory until the late nineteenth century. The Mexican government wanted to diminish, and eventually end, arms smuggling from Belizean Maya supplied by rebels during the Caste War, which prolonged the situation.

As a result, the government of Porfirio Diaz created a Federal Territory which had previously belonged to the State of Yucatan. They later formed the Territory of Quintana Roo and decided to negotiate with the British government to finally fix the common border. They agreed to recognize British governance for the territory in return for Britain's promise to refrain from arming the Maya. With respect to these intentions, Mexico appointed Ignacio Mariscal, Secretary of Foreign Affairs, as Minister Plenipotentiary and the United Kingdom appointed Sir Spenser St. John to its Minister Plenipotentiary in Mexico for negotiations.

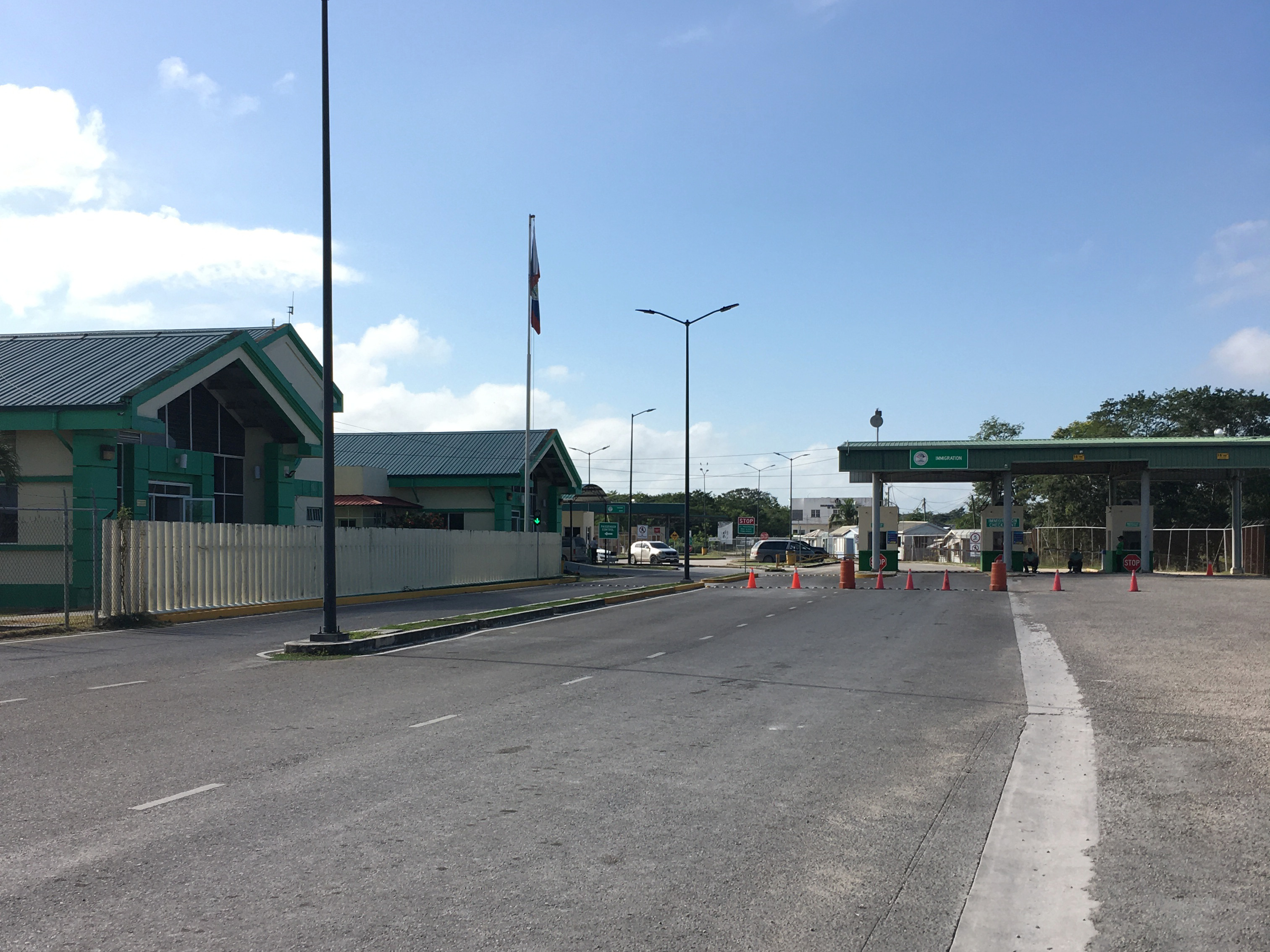
Belize border customs

== Treaty ==
A treaty was signed on July 8, 1893, in Mexico City, and an additional convention added on April 7, 1897. The original treaty consisted of four articles; the first set the upper border, the second required the United Kingdom to stop arming Mayan rebels, the third laid out the obligation of both states to prevent Native Americans from gradually encroaching into the territory of the neighboring country, and the fourth required ratification of the treaty by the respective governments.

The additional convention, signed by Ignacio Mariscal and the new British minister in Mexico, Sir Henry Nevill Dering, updated Article 3 to include a treaty establishing freedom for Mexican merchant ships to sail without restriction through the Boca Bacalar Chico and all British territorial waters in the Bay of Chetumal. Military vessels were not included in the treaty. Admission to the Bay of Chetumal in Mexico called for the construction of the Canal de Zaragoza.

In early 2007, the Ministry of Foreign Affairs of Mexico announced an agreement with Belize for the delimitation of the maritime boundary in the Bay of Chetumal. This announcement initially sparked widespread public rejection of Quintana Roo because of a version that implied a territorial return to Belize that would include inland areas. It was later clarified that it was only a correction of the maritime boundary, which did not change the border treaty of 1893.

== Border ==
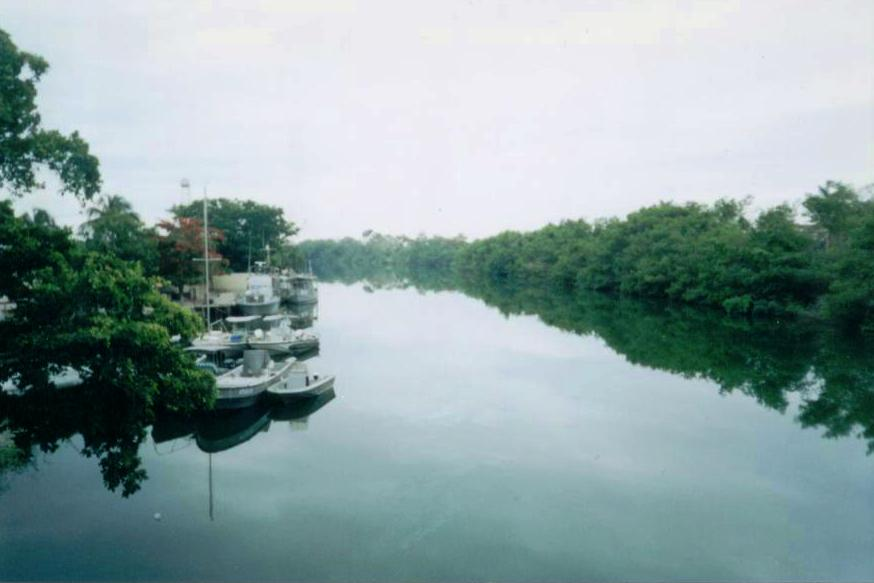
The Rio Hondo viewed from the international bridge between Subteniente Lopez and Santa Elena.

Under the treaty, the border starts at Boca Bacalar Chico, a narrow channel that separates the southern tip of the Caribbean coast of the Yucatan Peninsula and Ambergris Caye. It then runs through Chetumal Bay in a broken line up to the mouth of the Hondo River. The border follows the Hondo River through its deepest channel and then along its tributary, Blue Creek, until it reaches the meridian of Garbutt's Falls (approximately 89° 9' W). From this point, it runs directly south to 17° 49' N latitude, the border established between Mexico and Guatemala.

Currently the border has two official crossings where there are international bridges. The main one is located between Subteniente Lopez, Quintana Roo, Mexico, and Santa Elena, Corozal District, Belize. It is about 16 km (10 mi) from Chetumal, which is the capital of Quintana Roo and main city of the region. A new Belize–Mexico bridge located about 5 blocks west of the old bridge was opened to the public on 15 May 2013.

The border between Mexico and Belize is one of the lesser-used borders by Mexicans, but it gained notoriety due to recent reports of drug trafficking across the border, with drug traffickers attracted by the border's relative isolation. This problem has also become more prevalent due to a significant increase in economic activity and tourism, especially on the Belize side of the border. It has also become more commonplace due to Belize establishing a free trade zone and the construction of casinos in the Santa Elena area.

Bilateral agreements between Mexico and Belize have been made to combat the issue of drug trafficking across the border.

== Cities on both sides ==
- Subteniente López, Quintana Roo - Santa Elena, Corozal
- La Unión, Quintana Roo - Blue Creek Village, Orange Walk

== International Bridges ==
- Subteniente Lopez International Bridge
- Chac-Temal International Bridge

== See also ==
- Belize–Mexico relations
