= Nohmul =

Pre-Columbian Maya archaeological site

- Location in Belize
- 18°13′2.48″N 88°35′5.03″W
- Periods: Construction 7th to 10th centuries
- Cultures: Maya
- Location: San Pablo, Orange Walk District, Belize
- Region: Orange Walk District

History
- Built: c. 350 BC to 250 AD
- Abandoned: after 10th century

Nohmul (or Noh Mul) is a pre-Columbian Maya archaeological site located on the eastern Yucatán Peninsula, in what is today northern Belize. The name Nohmul may be translated as "great mound" in Yucatec Maya. It is the most important Maya site in northern Belize. The site included a large pyramid, about 17 meters (56 ft) tall, built around 250 BC. Most of the pyramid was destroyed in May 2013 by contractors tearing it apart for rocks and gravel to use to fill roads, leaving only the core of the pyramid behind.

== History ==
Nohmul was occupied initially during the Preclassic era of Mesoamerican chronology (c. 350 BC to 250 AD). By the 5th century, monumental construction at the site had effectively ceased and the site seems to have been largely abandoned save for some scattered rural-domestic activities. After a hiatus in construction activities of several centuries, Nohmul was reoccupied and large-scale building resumed, with maximal activity seen during the Late Classic era (c. 7th–10th centuries). The site was densely developed and occupied into the 12th century.

Built above the Hondo River to control the region's trade routes, the site was occupied for centuries. At its height, it was the seat of government for an area spanning approximately 8 square miles (21 km^{2}). Later pre-Columbian residents built structures of the northern Yucatán type over those erected in the Classic era. Some of these more recent constructions covered the front of older stairways. These newer constructions include one that resembles El Caracol, Chichen Itza in Chichén Itzá. These later constructions are evidence supporting the theory that outsiders from the Yucatán settled in Nohmul.

== Site description ==
Nohmul is 10 kilometres (6 mi) north of Orange Walk Town and occupies about 35 square kilometres (14 sq mi) making it the largest Maya site in northern Belize. The site includes about 700 visible mounds ranging from 10 to 30 meters in diameter and from 1 to 5 meters in height.

Nohmul is noted for its unusual layout, with the urban or ceremonial precinct spanning the crest of a limestone ridge overlooking the Hondo River, a permanent river that forms the modern border between Mexico and Belize. The urban precinct consists of two separate clusters of structures, an East Group and West Group, linked by a raised causeway, or sacbe. The East Group is the larger and has been more extensively excavated. The two groups of buildings have a total of ten plazas. Combined, these complexes include more than 80 separate structures. Most of them were constructed either in the Preclassic or Classic period, although there is evidence of additional building activity in the early Postclassic.

== Archaeology ==
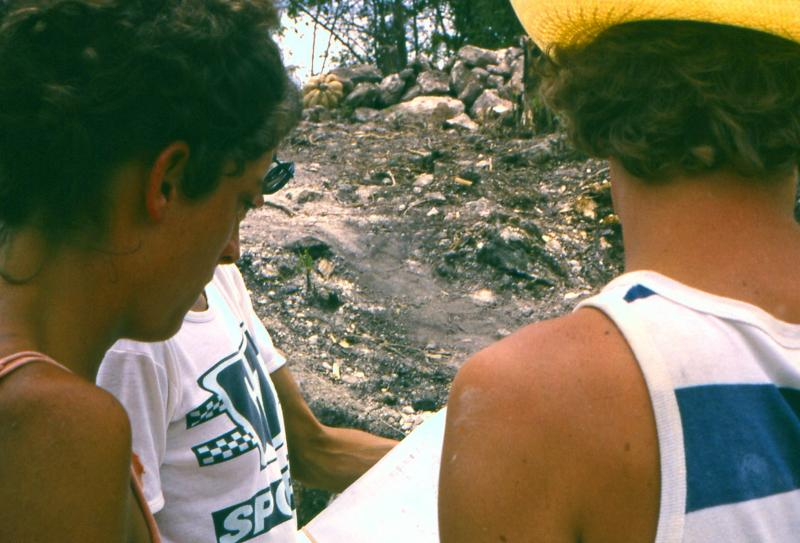
Nohmul excavation at Structure 8, in 1985

The first published reference to Nohmul occurs in Thomas Gann's 1897 paper "On the Contents of Some Ancient Mounds in Central America". Gann performed several excavations at the site between 1908 and 1936. Several of the artifacts collected by Gann are now housed at the British Museum in London.

Prehistoric features at the site were first mapped in 1973 by Norman Hammond. Hammond returned with a small team in the 1980s to do a series of excavations known as The Nohmul Project.

== 2013 damage ==
On May 13, 2013, the largest structure at Nohmul was almost completely destroyed. Contractors used excavators and bulldozers to remove large portions of the central pyramid for its limestone content to fill roads in nearby Douglas Village with gravel. Prior to the destruction, the pyramid had a footprint of approximately 50 by 52 meters and was approximately 17 meters tall. More than 70% of the structure was destroyed. The heavy equipment belonged to De-Mar's Stone Company, a company owned by UDP politician Denny Grijalva. Although the structure was on privately owned land, by law, all pre-Columbian sites are under national government protection in Belize.

John Morris of the Belizean Institute of Archaeology said that the workers would have known that they were bulldozing Maya ruins as the tall structure was unmistakable. Jaime Awe, head of the Belize Institute of Archaeology, noted that the pyramid mound could not have been mistaken for a natural hill as the landscape is otherwise flat and the ruins were well known.

After a lengthy investigation, charges were levied on June 27, 2013 against four individuals: foreman Javier Nunez, excavator driver Emil Cruz, and the managing directors of De-Mar's Stone Company, Denny and Emelda Grijalva. In April 2016, Javier Nunez, Denny Grijalva, and Emelda Grijalva were found guilty on two charges: removing earth from an ancient monument without permission and willfully damaging an ancient monument. Each of them was fined BZ$6000, and the De-Mar's Stone Company was also fined BZ$6000. Denny Grijalva apologized for the destruction and said that his company would work with the government to ensure that it would not happen again.

Similar destruction occurred at the nearby San Estevan site in 2005, as well as at many other ancient sites throughout Belize. Professor Norman Hammond of Boston University, who worked on Belizean archaeological sites extensively during the 1980s, told the Associated Press that "bulldozing Maya mounds for road fill is an endemic problem in Belize".

== See also ==
- El Paraíso, a pyramid in Peru destroyed in 2013 by property developers
