= Going Wild with Jeff Corwin =

- Genre: Wildlife documentary
- Written by: Jane Bahk; Paul Storck
- Directed by: Mark Cole; Scott Firestone (8 episodes), Kathryn Douglas (first season)
- Presented by: Jeff Corwin
- Country of origin: United States
- No. of seasons: 3
- No. of episodes: 39

Production
- Executive producers: Tim Braine; Kevin M. Meagher
- Producers: Scott Firestone; Paul Storck
- Cinematography: Matthew W. Davis
- Running time: 30 minutes
- Production company: Popular Arts Entertainment

Original release
- Network: Disney Channel
- Release: August 10, 1997 – June 13, 1999

Going Wild with Jeff Corwin is a nature documentary television series produced and aired in the late 1990s on the Disney Channel. Hosted by Jeff Corwin, the show lasted for three seasons from August 10, 1997, to June 13, 1999, before it was canceled.

The show was first announced in an August 1997, simultaneously with another nature-oriented Disney show, Omba Mokomba. In the show, Corwin travels to natural places around the world, including Florida, South Africa, Papua New Guinea, Death Valley, and Hawaii, searching for wild animals. In each episode, Jeff searches for a "Feature Creature", and always finds it at the end of the episode. Creatures previously featured include manatees, cobras, crocodiles, bighorn sheep, dolphins, and bears. As he explores, Jeff looks for "Creature Clues" to help him find the animal. In some episodes, Jeff also explores ancient ruins, including, Gila Cliff Dwellings, Port Arthur, Rhyolite, and Ayutthaya.

== Episodes ==
=== Season 1 (1997) ===
- Belize (Blue Creek Rainforest Preserve) (August 10, 1997)
- South Dakota (Black Hills) (August 17, 1997)
- Wyoming (Yellowstone National Park) (August 24, 1997)
- Montana (Glacier National Park) (August 31, 1997)
- Belize II (Barrier Reef) (September 7, 1997)
- Florida (Everglades National Park) (September 14, 1997)
- South Africa (Ndzalama Reserve) (September 21, 1997)
- Florida II (Homosassa River) (September 28, 1997)
- South Africa II (Djuma Reserve) (October 5, 1997)
- Idaho (Snake River Canyon) (October 12, 1997)
- Arizona (Sonoran Desert) (October 19, 1997)
- Kenya (Tsavo East National Park) (October 26, 1997)
- New York (New York City) (November 2, 1997)
- New Mexico (Gila National Forest) (November 9, 1997)
- Florida III (Florida Keys) (November 16, 1997)
- Colorado (Rocky Mountain National Park) (November 23, 1997)

=== Season 2 (1998) ===
- Venezuela (Llanos) (August 2, 1998)
- Costa Rica (Corcovado National Park) (August 9, 1998)
- California (Death Valley National Park) (August 16, 1998)
- Mexico (Baja California) (August 23, 1998)
- Louisiana (Atchafalaya Swamp) (September 13, 1998)
- Costa Rica II (Rincon De La Vieja) (September 27, 1998)
- California II (Angeles National Forest) (October 11, 1998)
- Tennessee (Great Smoky Mountains National Park) (November 1, 1998)
- Borneo (Bako National Park) (November 8, 1998)
- Washington (Olympic National Park) (November 22, 1998)
- Thailand (Khao Sok National Park) (December 13, 1998)

=== Season 3 (1999) ===
- Alaska (Katmai National Park) (January 17, 1999)
- Washington II (North Cascades National Park) (January 24, 1999)
- Thailand II (Khao Yai National Park) (March 7, 1999)
- California III (Monterey Bay) (April 22, 1999)
- Hawaiian Islands (Hawaii) (April 25, 1999)
- Papua New Guinea (Morobe Province) (May 2, 1999)
- Australia (Tasmania) (May 9, 1999)
- Kentucky (Mammoth Cave National Park) (May 16, 1999)
- Australia II (Central Australia) (May 23, 1999)
- Micronesia (Palau) (May 30, 1999)
- Canada (Hudson Bay, Manitoba) (June 6, 1999)
- Australia III (Daintree National Park) (June 13, 1999)

== Filming ==
Jeff and his crew filmed in some of the most exotic places in the world. In some episodes, they filmed in special wildlife parks. This was revealed in the Special Thanks section of the credits. In some episodes, Jeff also met up with some locals, who gave him hints on where to find his "Feature Creature". Filming time depends on the location. In Death Valley, they only filmed for 2 days, but in South Africa, they filmed for 3 months.

== Animals ==
Jeff mainly filmed animals in the wild, but some animals were borrowed from museums and nature parks. The cougar cubs, he showed in South Dakota, were actually cubs out of wildlife rehabilitation, that were being released back into the wild. In the Special Thanks section of the credits, in some episodes it has the names of zoos and wildlife parks. The credits also state that, No Animals Were Harmed During The Making of This Program, and Some Animal Situations Have Been Recreated. It's not always easy to find the animals they need. In Los Angeles, Jeff spent 3 hours on a surf board, looking for pelicans, and in South Africa, him and his crew spend 3 weeks searching for an aardwolf, but the editing made it look like he was only there for 2 days.

=== Close encounters ===
Jeff had some close encounters while filming his show. While filming an episode in South Africa, Jeff got attacked by a leopard, but he had a stick with him, and stood his ground, and the leopard backed off. In his journals, Jeff also stated that an African lion jumped on him, and pawed his head. In Alaska, Jeff was nearly trampled by a moose, and in Thailand, he had to keep dodging king cobra strikes.

== Titles in other languages ==
- Spanish: Las Aventuras de Jeff Corwin ("The Adventures of Jeff Corwin")

== VHS tapes ==
The show has been canceled since 1999, however, all the episodes from the series are available for purchase on VHS online.
