= Norwell High School =

Norwell High School may refer to:

- Norwell High School (Indiana) - Wells County, Indiana
- Norwell High School (Massachusetts) - Norwell, Massachusetts
