= Belize–Mexico relations =

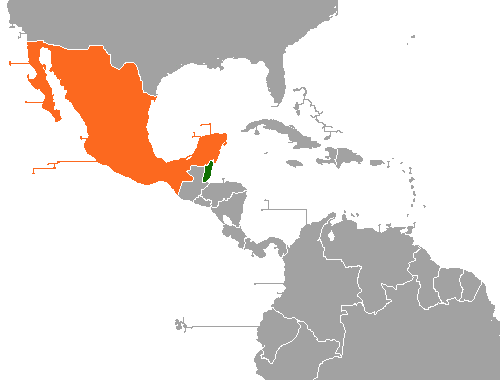

- Belize: Mexico

Belize and Mexico are neighbouring nations that established official diplomatic relations in 1981 after Belize obtained its independence. However, diplomatic relations between Mexico and British administered British Honduras existed as early as 1893. Relations between both nations are based on proximity, trade and cultural connections between the Maya peoples of Belize and southern Mexico.

Both nations are members of the Association of Caribbean States, the Community of Latin American and Caribbean States, the Organization of American States, and the United Nations.

== History ==
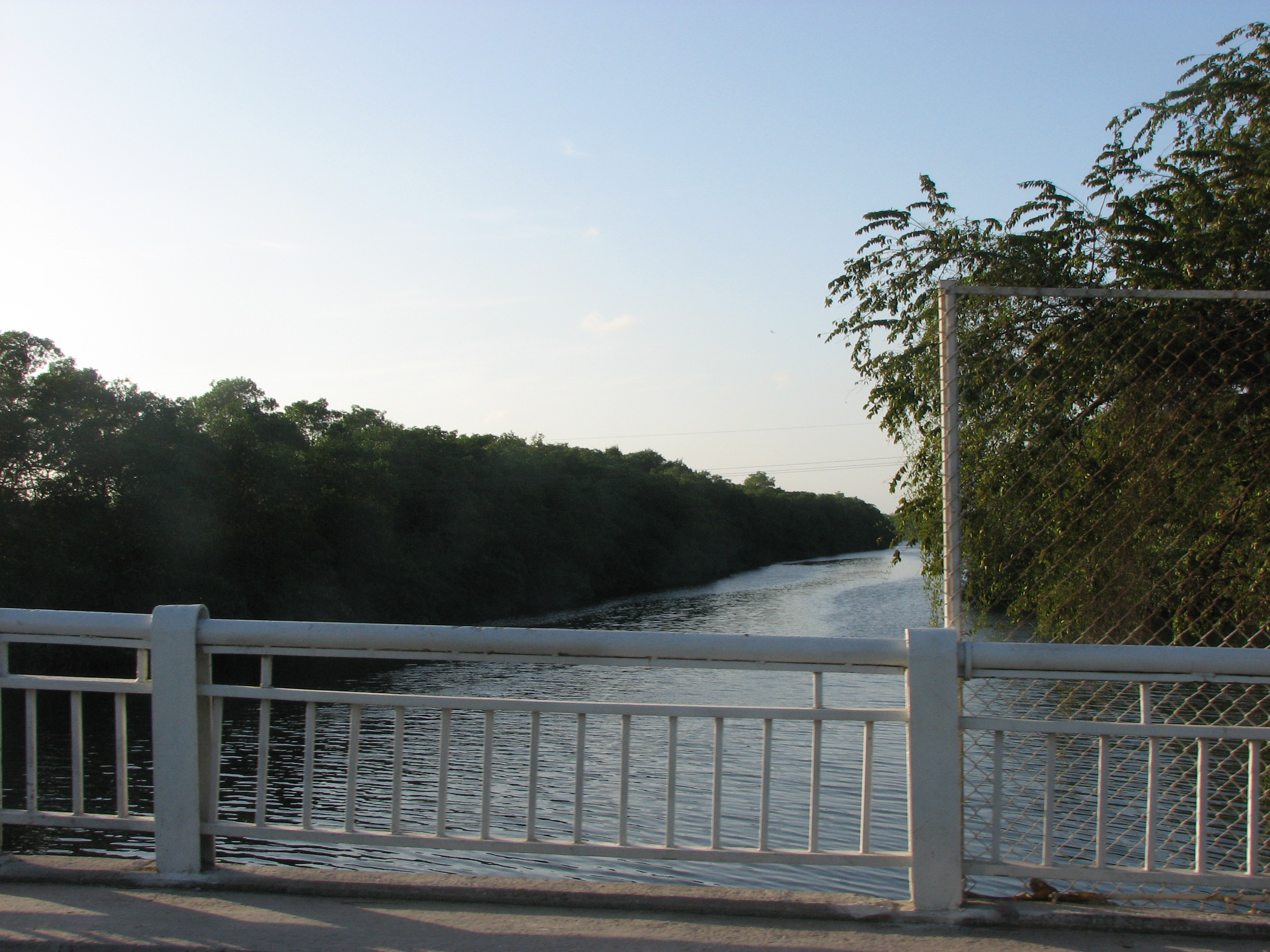
The Hondo River forming a natural border between Belize and Mexico

The Yucatán Peninsula, which is now divided between the nations of Belize, Guatemala and Mexico, was once home to the Mayan civilisation. In the 16th century, Spain invaded the territory and administered the land from Mexico City, seat of the Viceroyalty of New Spain. After Spanish conquest, the territory that would later be known as Belize was poorly administered and open to attacks from pirates. In the 17th century, British settlers began arriving to Belize and fought several battles to try to gain control of the territory. In the late 18th century, the United Kingdom formally took over the territory of Belize. In July 1893, Mexico signed a treaty with the United Kingdom setting borders between the two nations, which is still in place today.

On 21 September 1981, Belize became an independent nation. The same day, Belize and Mexico established diplomatic relations with Mexico establishing the first embassy in the country, while the United Kingdom established a High Commission. In 1982, Belizean Prime Minister George Price became the first head of state from Belize to pay an official visit to Mexico. In 1986, Belize opened its embassy in Mexico City. In 1988, Mexican President Miguel de la Madrid became the first Mexican head of state to pay an official visit to Belize. Since then, there have been several high-level visits between heads of states from both nations.

In 2021, both nations celebrated 40 years of diplomatic relations. In May 2022, Mexican President Andrés Manuel López Obrador paid an official visit to Belize. In October 2024, Prime Minister Johnny Briceño travelled to Mexico to attend the inauguration of President Claudia Sheinbaum.

== High-level visits ==
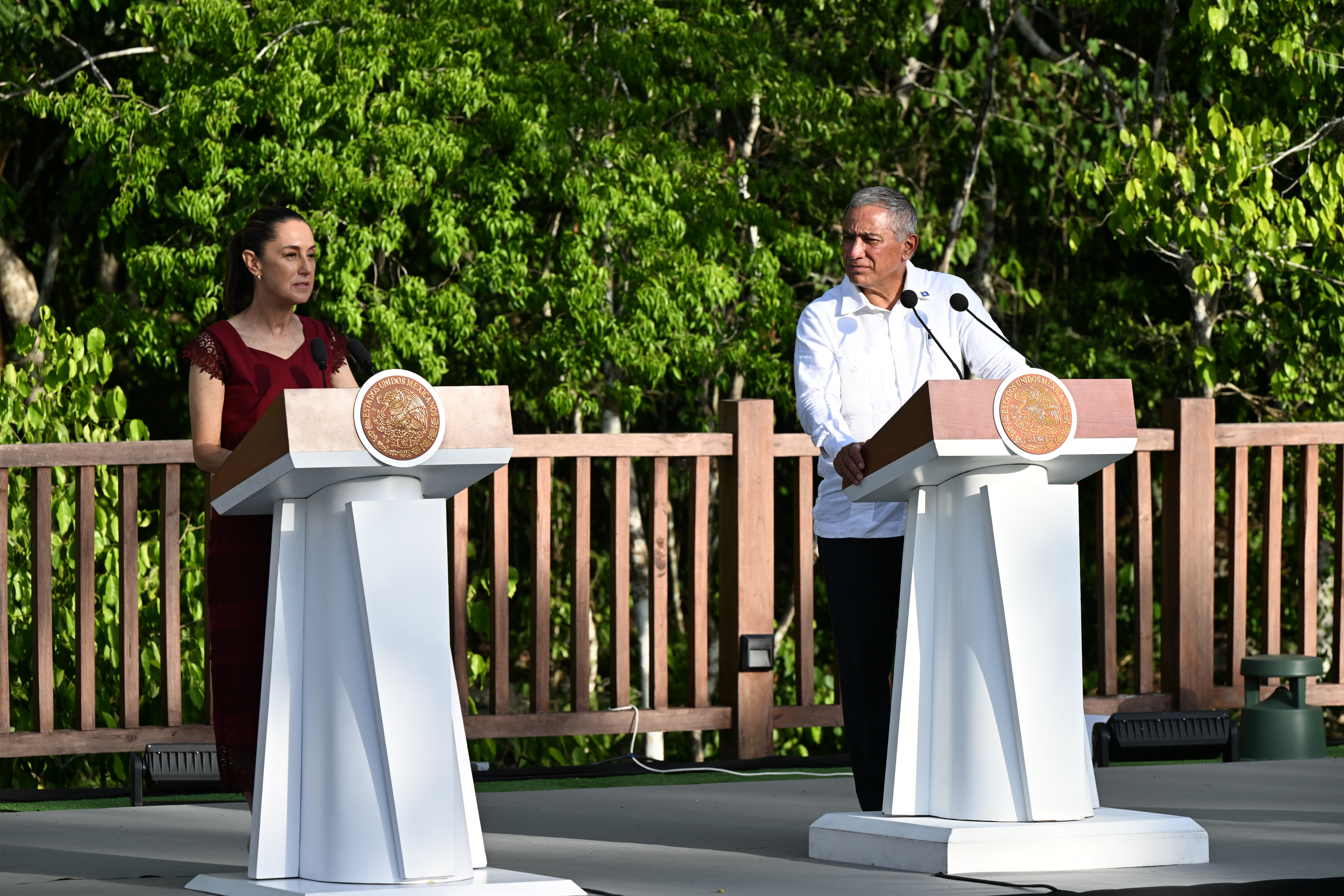
Mexican President Claudia Sheinbaum and Belizean Prime Minister Johnny Briceño in Calakmul, Mexico; August 2025.

Prime Ministerial visits from Belize to Mexico

- Prime Minister George Cadle Price (1982, 1983)
- Prime Minister Manuel Esquivel (1985, 1993, 1994, 1995, 1997)
- Prime Minister Said Musa (1999, 2000, 2004, 2006, 2007)
- Prime Minister Dean Barrow (2010, 2012)
- Prime Minister Johnny Briceño (2021, 2023, May & October 2024, 2025)

Presidential visits from Mexico to Belize

- President Miguel de la Madrid Hurtado (1988)
- President Carlos Salinas de Gortari (1991)
- President Vicente Fox (2005)
- President Felipe Calderón (2007)
- President Enrique Peña Nieto (2017)
- President Andrés Manuel López Obrador (2022)

== Bilateral agreements ==
Both nations have signed several bilateral agreements such as an Agreement of Territorial Limits of British Honduras signed between Mexico and the United Kingdom (1893); Postal Agreement (1911); Agreement of Cultural Exchanges (1982); Agreement on the Execution of Criminal Judgements (1986); Extradition Treaty (1988); Agreement of Cooperation in Combating Drug Trafficking and Drug Dependency (1990); Agreement of Cooperation in the Preservation and Maintenance of Archaeological Zones (1990); Agreement of Tourism Cooperation (1990); Agreement for the Protection and Restitution of Archaeological, Artistic and Historical Monuments (1991); Agreement for the Protection and Improvement of the Environment and Conservation of Natural Resources in the Border Zone (1991); Agreement of Scientific and Technical Cooperation (1995) and an Agreement on Exchange of Information on Tax Matters (2011).

== Transportation and border crossings ==
There are direct flights between both nations with Tropic Air. There are also several border crossings along the Belize–Mexico border.

== Trade ==
In 2023, trade between Belize and Mexico totalled US$185.2 million. Belize's main exports to Mexico include: shrimp and crustaceans; motors; machinery parts and scrap metal. Mexico's main exports to Belize include: electric energy; textiles; cement and parts for the cement industry. Mexican multinational company, Cemex, operates in Belize.

== Resident diplomatic missions ==
- Belize has an embassy in Mexico City.
- Mexico has an embassy in Belmopan and a consular section in Belize City.

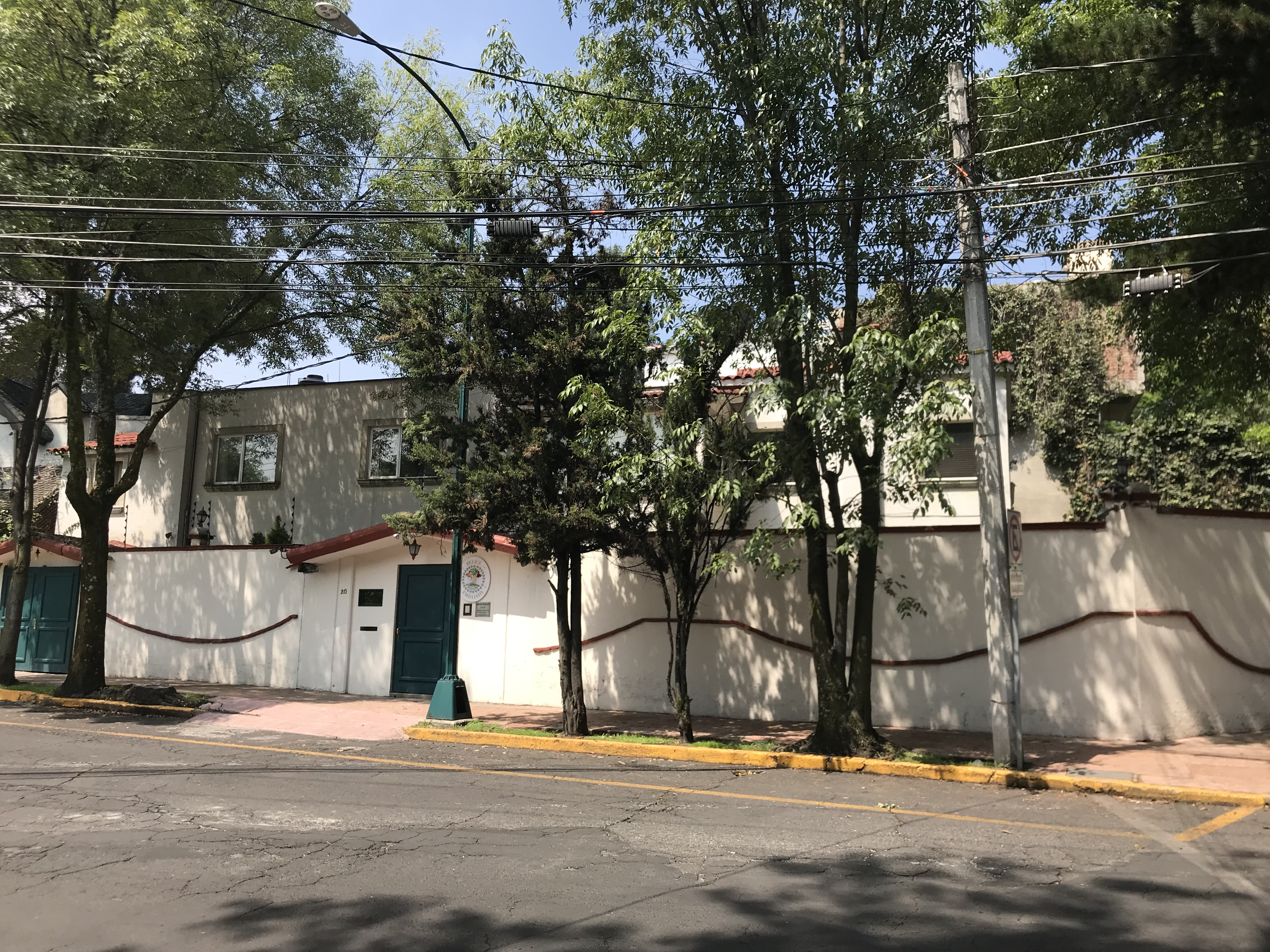
Embassy of Belize in Mexico City

== Gallery ==
Border between Belize and Mexico

Flags of Belize, Mexico and the United States

Naval personnel from Belize and Mexico during a joint training exercise

== See also ==
- Belize–Mexico border
- Foreign relations of Belize
- Foreign relations of Mexico
