= Norwell High School (Massachusetts) =

Coordinates: 42.156329°N 70.837521°W

Location
- 18 South Street; Norwell, Massachusetts; United States

Information
- Type: Public secondary
- Established: 1849 (1700 as part of Scituate)
- Superintendent: Matthew Keegan
- Principal: Marc Bender
- Staff: 50.77 (FTE)
- Grades: 9-12
- Enrollment: 596 (2023–2024)
- Student to teacher ratio: 11.74
- Campus: Suburban, 100 acres
- Colors: Blue & gold
- Nickname: Clippers
- Rival: Hanover, Scituate, Cohasset
- Accreditation: NEASC
- Publication: The Halyard (literary journal)
- Newspaper: The Navigator
- Website: https://nhs.norwellschools.org/

Norwell High School is a public secondary school accredited by the New England Association of Schools and Colleges (NEASC). It is located in Norwell, Massachusetts, United States. The school includes approximately 50 full-time teachers. Its students consistently score above state and national averages on the SAT and other standardized tests, and on average, 97% of students from each graduating class at Norwell High School continue on to post-secondary education.

NHS has been ranked as the 12th best secondary school in Massachusetts, and is ranked in the top 6% for best public education high schools in the country by Newsweek.

== Administration ==
On July 1, 2011, William Fish became the new principal of Norwell High School, replacing Matthew Keegan, who had been serving the school since 2006.

Toward the end of the 1980s, Norwell High School lowered their grading system, as the numbers were higher than standard grading systems. For example, a final grade of 82 was a C+ versus a B−.

The school's staff includes nine cafeteria workers and six custodians.

== Academics ==
The school offers a wide array of academic courses in several departments. Students are required to take four years of English, History, Mathematics and Science courses. Students are required to take at least three years of a Foreign Language. Some students complete their first year of foreign language while in middle school, so they only have to complete two years at NHS; some choose to take their fourth and fifth year of a language and continue these courses into college. Students are required to take at least two years of Health/Physical Education. They may also take other courses, including classes in art, music and technology, as seen below.

Course name	Notes
English	Freshmen, sophomores and juniors take classes involving American and World Literature. Seniors may choose from English classes including a class on the study of Shakespeare's work, a creative writing class, Nonfiction, Adolescent in Literature and two AP courses.
Social Studies	Classes include World History, US History (including AP), European History (including AP), Psychology (including AP), Economics, Law, Gender/Race/Class, American Government (AP), The Holocaust and Human Behavior, and Modern War.
Mathematics	Classes include Algebra, Geometry, Trigonometry, Statistics and Discrete Mathematics (including AP), Calculus (including AP) and Problem Solving.
Science	For science, freshmen take Biology. NHS also offers an AP course for biology that students may take after freshman year. Sophomores are required to take Chemistry. NHS offers an AP course for chemistry that students may take after their sophomore year. Juniors are required to take Physics. NHS offers an AP class for students to take after their junior year. Seniors are allowed to choose a science class, including Anatomy, Astronomy, Marine Biology and Renewable Energy.
Foreign Language	NHS offers four languages: Arabic, Spanish, French, and Latin. There are AP and SUPA course offerings in all but Arabic. Latin courses cover Vergil, Horace, Pliny, and Catullus.
Art	Studio Art (Art 1, Art 2, Art 3, AP Studio Art: 2D design or 3D design). When students reach a certain level in their art studies they are allowed to paint a painting on a wall located somewhere in the school. The school also offers digital photography classes and a film class.
Music	NHS offers students Wind Ensemble, Symphonic Band, mixed Chorus, Jazz Ensemble, and Jazz Workshop. The ensembles usually perform at four to five major concerts a year, on special occasions including graduation, and dozens of other events each year in the community.
PE/Health	Students are required to take two years of Health/Physical Education. They can then choose from other Physical Education classes, such as Strength Training, Lifetime Activities, Yoga, Pilates and Lifetime Fitness.
Applied Technology	Classes include Publications and Presentations, Web Design, Computer Animation, Computer Repair, TV Studio, Robotics, CAD, Engineering the Future and Building Construction.
Special Education	Skills Program, Direct Academic Instruction, Life Skills, Work Experience, Life Skills Reading, Content Area Reading
Theater	No acting classes are currently offered at NHS, but there is an extracurricular theatre program, the Fourth Wall Players, directed by Samantha Kelly.

In 2009, the school began Arabic classes after teachers requested them. As of 2015, 25 students take Arabic I, and 10 take Arabic II. As of 2015 few other high schools in Massachusetts offer Arabic.

== Athletics ==
The school's sports programs include:

Sport	Notes
Baseball	Boys' JV, boys' varsity
Basketball	Boys' freshman team, boys' JV, boys' varsity / girls' freshman team, girls' JV, girls' varsity
Cheerleading	Girls' game team, girls' competition team
Cross country	Boys' JV, boys' varsity / girls' JV, girls' varsity
Field hockey	Girls' JV, girls' varsity
Football	Boys' freshman team, boys' JV, boys' varsity
Golf	Boys' JV, boys' varsity
Gymnastics	Girls' varsity
Ice Hockey	Boys' JV, boys' varsity / girls' varsity
EASHL	Varsity, JV
Lacrosse	Boys' freshman, boys' JV, boys' varsity / girls' freshman, girls' JV, girls' varsity
Skiing	Boys' & girls' co-ed varsity & JV
Spring track and field	Boys & girls' co-ed
Soccer	Boys' JV, boys' varsity, boys' freshman / girls' JV, girls' varsity, girls' freshman
Softball	Girls' JV, girls' varsity
Swimming and diving	Boys' & girls' co-ed
Tennis	Boys' JV, boys' varsity / girls' JV, girls' varsity
Volleyball	Girls' varsity, girls' JV
Winter track and field	Boys' & girls' co-ed
Wrestling	Boys' & girls' co-ed

In 2014, Norwell added two synthetic turf fields and a track and field facility to their athletic complex.

== Co-curricular activities ==
The school includes clubs and activities, including:

- ADL (Anti-Defamation League Club)
- AFS & International Club
- BioSTEM Club
- Book Club
- Clip Notes
- Environmental Club
- Film Club
- Global Citizenship
- Halyard literary & arts magazine
- Investment Club
- JSA (Junior Statesmen of America)
- Latin Club
- LEAD
- Math Team
- Medical Careers Club
- Mock Trial
- Model United Nations
- National Honor Society
- Norwell Navigator newspaper
- Norwell Volunteer Corps
- Peer Education
- Pep Band
- Robotics
- SADD
- Student Government
- Theater - 4th Wall Players
- Yearbook

== Notable alumni ==
Name	Graduation	Notable for
Jennifer Coolidge	Class of 1979	Emmy Award-winning actress, The White Lotus, American Pie, Click, For Your Consideration
Jeff Corwin	Class of 1985	Host of The Jeff Corwin Experience and Corwin's Quest on Animal Planet; often visits Norwell to help at the Norwell Science Center
Susan Tedeschi	Class of 1988	Blues and soul singer; received Grammy nominations in 2000, 2003, and 2007
Laura Wilson	Class of 1957	Photographer; mother of actors Owen Wilson and Luke Wilson
