= Hokeb Ha Cave =

Cave in Belize

- Blue Creek Cave
- Location within Belize
- Interactive map of Hokeb Ha Cave
- Location: Blue Creek, Toledo, Belize
- Coordinates: 16°11′56″N 89°02′43″W
- Discovery: 1973 (archaeological discovery)
- Geology: Limestone
- Entrances: 1
- Difficulty: Moderate to difficult
- Hazards: Sudden water level rise during the rainy season
- Access: By hike; guided tours required
- Show cave opened: No
- Lighting: None; headlamps required
- Features: Stalactite, stalagmite, polychrome vase, Maya hieroglyphs
- Translation: "Where the water enters the earth" (Mayan)
- Nearby attractions: Blue Creek rainforest

Hokeb Ha Cave ("Where the water enters the earth" in Mayan), also known as Blue Creek Cave, is a significant wet-cave located near the village of Blue Creek in the Toledo District, Belize. The cave is renowned for its archaeological importance as well as its natural beauty.

== Description ==
Hokeb Ha Cave begins in the vicinity of Santa Cruz and extends into the village of Blue Creek, situated approximately 27.6 kilometers from Punta Gorda. The entrance to the cave is accessed after a 20-minute hike from Blue Creek village.

The cave entrance is framed by limestone formations and a cascading waterfall, which is an essential part of the cave's hydrological system. Visitors often swim through the pools inside the cave, navigating through chambers adorned with stalactites, stalagmites, and Maya hieroglyphs.

== Archaeology ==
In 1973, a Peace Corps volunteer named Kim Kennedy discovered 24 ceramic vessels in front of an altar within the cave. Among these was the "Hokeb Ha Vase," a polychrome piece dating back to the Late Classic Period (A.D. 600–800) of the Maya civilization. This vase was later memorialized on a Belizean postage stamp.

The discovery of these artifacts suggests that Hokeb Ha Cave was used for ceremonial purposes, particularly in rituals related to water and the underworld, which were central to Maya spiritual beliefs.

== Tourism ==
Hokeb Ha Cave is a popular site for eco-tourism, with activities such as cave swimming, tubing, and hiking. However, the cave's interior can only be explored with a guide, due to the potential risks posed by sudden water level changes during the rainy season. Local guides are available in Blue Creek village and at the nearby research station, ensuring that visitors can safely experience the cave's natural and historical wonders.
