= Blue Creek, Toledo =

Village in Toledo District, Belize

Coordinates: 16.1988°N 89.0452°W

Blue Creek is a village in the Toledo District of Belize. It is a Mopan people and Kekchi village of about 270 people. The community lies along flat roads, spanning both sides of Blue Creek. Clusters of thatch huts border both sides of Blue Creek, a beautiful, clear stream emerging from the surrounding thick jungle. The colour of blue-green pool where Maya women beat their laundry on the smooth stones gave the village its name. The banks are lined with tall shady trees. The reflection of the thick jungle rainforest, which lines both sides, is clearly visible in the surface of the creek.

Blue Creek Village was first known as Rio Blanco. Families from San Antonio and Aguacate moved there after discovering the clear water for washing and fishing, and the nearby fertile soil for milpas. Soon after, they changed the name of their new village to Blue Creek to reflect the beauty of the river which runs through the hills. Blue Creek offers hiking in the rainforest, exploration of the popular Hokeb Ha Cave and a Canopy Walk.

The Blue Creek 200-acre rainforest preserve is a 15-minute hike along a trail leading to the IZE Research Centre and a deep pool of clear water suited for swimming (the parking lot and trail is on the right just before the village bridge). The jungle sports bromeliads, orchids, cohune palms, and heliconias, and many medicinal plants, is a birdwatcher's spot with hundreds of species of birds; roaring howler monkeys can be heard nearby.

Further upstream is the Hokeb Ha Cave, with its large entrance carved from the summit of a hill where the Creek gurgles up from underground. Many Late Classic Maya ceramics have been found inside the cave, as well as an altar, and archaeologists believe the cave was used specifically for ceremonial purposes. The limestone caves are full of pristine crystal-clear mineral pools and lagoons, with a water temperature of a constant 75 degrees. Cave swimming trips are a popular activity (for safety, one must be accompanied by a guide and local guides can be hired in the village or at the Research Station). With life jackets and headlights tourists can visit one or more waterfalls, and view on stalactites and stalagmites.

== Demographics ==
At the time of the 2010 census, Blue Creek had a population of 365. Of these, 41.9% were Mopan Maya, 25.2% Ketchi Maya, 21.6% Mixed, 5.8% Caucasian, 2.7% Mennonite, 2.2% Mestizo, 0.3% Creole and 0.3% East Indian.
