= Norman Hammond =

British archaeologist

- Born: 10 July 1944 (age 82)

Academic work
- Institutions: Cambridge (1967-75); Bradford (1975–77); Rutgers (1977–88); Boston University (1988-2009)

Norman Hammond (born 10 July 1944) is a British archaeologist, academic and Mesoamericanist scholar, noted for his publications and research on the pre-Columbian Maya civilization.

== Career ==
Hammond was educated at Peterhouse, Cambridge. He held academic posts at Cambridge (1967–75), Bradford (1975–77), and Rutgers universities (1977–88), before he became a professor in the Archaeology Department at Boston University's College of Arts and Sciences (CAS) in 1988. Now retired at Boston, he is currently a Senior Fellow of the McDonald Institute for Archaeological Research at Cambridge.

He has been a visiting professor at the University of California at Berkeley, Jilin University (China), the Sorbonne and the University of Bonn.

Since 1968, he worked in the Maya lowlands at the following sites in Belize, Central America: Lubaantun (1970–1971), Nohmul (1973–1986), Cuello (1975–2002), and La Milpa (1992–2002). As well as specialising in the archaeology of Maya lowland sites in Belize, he has written on the emergence of complex societies in general, and on the history of archaeology.

He has worked on the editorial boards of Ancient Mesoamerica and the Journal of Field Archaeology. He has also been the archaeology correspondent for The Times newspaper in London.

In 1998 he was elected as a corresponding Fellow of the British Academy (FBA), honouring his contributions to the field of Mayanist research.

== Publications ==
Hammond's published books include:

- Lubaantun, 1926-70: The British Museum in British Honduras (1972, British Museum, ISBN 0714115339)
- Lubaantun: A Classic Maya Realm (1975, Harvard University Press for the Peabody Museum of Archaeology and Ethnology, ISBN 0873659015)
- Ancient Maya Civilization (April 1982, Cambridge University Press and Rutgers University Press, ISBN 0813509041, fifth edition released 1994)
- Nohmul: A Prehistoric Maya Community in Belize (December 1985, British Archaeological Reports, ISBN 0860543218)
- Cuello: An Early Maya Community in Belize (May 1991, Cambridge University Press, ISBN 0521384222)

=== Selected papers and articles ===
Some of the papers and articles published by Hammond include:

- Hammond, Norman (8 December 1972). "Obsidian Trade Routes in the Mayan Area". Science. 178 (4065): 1092–1093. Bibcode:1972Sci...178.1092H. doi:10.1126/science.178.4065.1092. PMID 17741982. S2CID 27212260.
- Hammond, Gawain; Hammond, Norman (July 1981). "Child's Play: A Distorting Factor in Archaeological Distribution". American Antiquity. 46 (3): 634–636. doi:10.2307/280608. JSTOR 280608. S2CID 163236114.
- Clutton-Brock, Juliet; Hammond, Norman (November 1994). "Hot dogs: Comestible Canids in Preclassic Maya Culture at Cuello, Belize". Journal of Archaeological Science. 21 (6): 819–826. Bibcode:1994JArSc..21..819C. doi:10.1006/jasc.1994.1079.
- Hammond, Norman; Bobo, Matthew R. (1994). "Pilgrimage's last mile: Late Maya monument veneration at La Milpa, Belize". Journal World Archaeology. 26 (1): 19–34. doi:10.1080/00438243.1994.9980258.
- Tykot, Robert H.; van der Merwe, Nikolaas J.; Hammond, Norman (5 May 1996). "Stable Isotope Analysis of Bone Collagen, Bone Apatite, and Tooth Enamel in the Reconstruction of Human Diet". Archaeological Chemistry. ACS Symposium Series. Vol. 625. pp. 355–365. doi:10.1021/bk-1996-0625.ch025. ISBN 9780841233959.
- Brady, James E.; Ball, Joseph W.; Bishop, Ronald L.; Pring, Duncan C.; Hammond, Norman; Housley, Rupert A. (1998). "The Lowland Maya "Protoclassic": A reconsideration of its nature and significance". Ancient Mesoamerica. 9 (1): 17–38. doi:10.1017/S0956536100001826. JSTOR 26308219. S2CID 58926208.
- van der Merwe, Nikolaas J.; Tykot, Robert H.; Hammond, Norman; Oakberg, Kim (2002). "Diet and Animal Husbandry of the Preclassic Maya at Cuello, Belize: Isotopic and Zooarchaeological Evidence". Biogeochemical Approaches to Paleodietary Analysis. 5: 23–38. doi:10.1007/0-306-47194-9_2. ISBN 978-0-306-46457-7.

== Additional reading ==
- McKillop, Heather I. (2004). The Ancient Maya: New Perspectives. Understanding ancient civilizations series. Santa Barbara, CA: ABC-CLIO. ISBN 1-57607-696-2. OCLC 52706645.
