= Kinal =

Mayan archaeological site in Petén Department, Guatemala

Coordinates: 17°42′00″N 89°14′30″W

Kinal is a major pre-Columbian Maya archaeological site in the Petén Department of the modern-day Petén Department of northern Guatemala. The major occupational phase for the site dates from the Late Classic period of Mesoamerican chronology (c.600–900 AD), with evidence for a substantial and expansionary building program dating from the first half of the 8th century AD. Kinal was discovered in the 1960s by archaeologist Ian Graham while he was carrying out an archaeological survey of the region, although no excavations were undertaken at the site at that time.

The name Kinal means "something that heats" in the Yucatec Maya language. In the Kʼicheʼ Maya language, kinal is used to refer a sacred fire. The first archaeological excavations were carried out in 1990 by the Proyecto Regional Ixcanrio ("Ixcanrio Regional Project"), directed by Richard Adams of the University of Texas. The site has suffered significant damage at the hands of looters but is now protected by custodians.

== Location ==
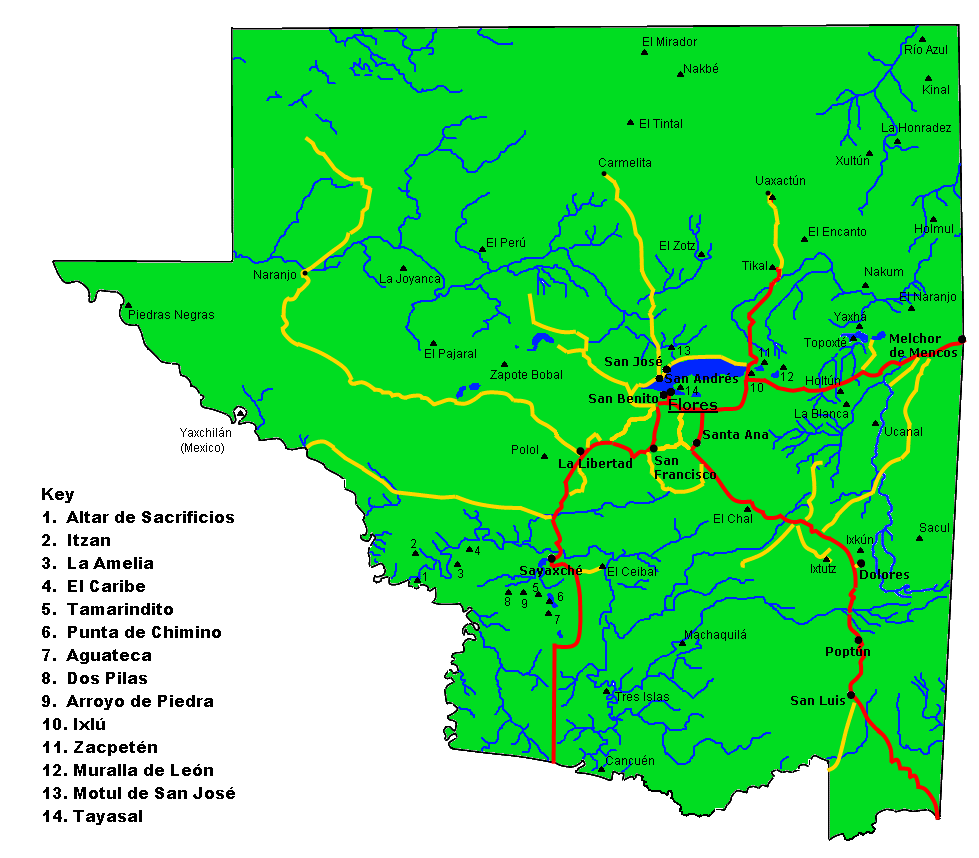
Map of the department of Petén showing the location of Kinal. Click to enlarge.

Kinal is located in the northeast of Guatemala's northern Petén department. The ruins are situated among tropical forest on a limestone plateau projecting above surrounding swamps (known as bajos) to the north and south, at an altitude of 140 metres (460 ft) above mean sea level. Kinal is located 12 kilometres (7.5 mi) south of the ruins of Río Azul. The city was built in a defensive location and was heavily fortified. The approach to the site was protected by steep hillsides, augmented by a 9-metre (30 ft) high platform topped by sheer walls. The fortification of the city took place between AD 680 and 810, and may have been motivated by the military catastrophe that overtook nearby Río Azul at the end of the Early Classic period (c. AD 600). It is likely that Kinal superseded Río Azul as the primary centre in the region and adopted the administrative functions that were formerly the preserve of that city.

The city's main water source provides water all year round and has been used in modern times to supply a gum-gatherers' (known as chicleros in Spanish) camp at the site. A path has been opened through the forest from the camp to Fallabón, near Melchor de Mencos on the Guatemalan side of the border with Belize.

== Site description ==
The area of the city centre was mapped by Ian Graham and covers approximately 60 hectares (6,500,000 sq ft). However, architectural remains extend beyond this central zone to the edges of the northern and southern swamps, a distance of approximately 2 kilometres (1.2 mi). The plateau on which the ruins are situated is not broken by abrupt changes in altitude but rather presents a smoothly contoured elevation. The layout of the site is centred on a north-south axis centred on the causeway; in general the plan of the site is similar to that of Ixkun on the Dolores Plateau in the southern Petén. The architectural style of the site corresponds to the Late Classic period. The site is noted for its complete absence of sculpted monuments such as stelae and altars.

The city possessed an acropolis complex arranged around a raised plaza with external walls enclosing it and restricting access. The acropolis is unusually complex and is estimated to contain between 100-200 rooms. A 20-metre (66 ft) wide causeway runs across the site from north to south crossing from the edge of one swamp to the other. A water source is located 50 metres (160 ft) southeast of the acropolis and provides water all year; it was probably the principal water source during Kinal's occupation. A number of chultun subterranean storage chambers are evident at the site.

The South Plaza is the southernmost plaza at Kinal. It is bordered on the north side by Structure 65, on the west by Structure 66 and on the east by Structure 64. From the plaza the terrain descends gently to the southern swamp, with the intervening area supporting a scattering of other structures.

=== Structures ===
All of the structures at Kinal were built using masonry, often utilising natural limestone outcrops as a foundation. Stonework varies considerably in quality, from finely cut, well-fitting blocks to roughly worked irregular stones. Most of the structures possessed corbel vaulting. Many of the city's structures have been damaged by looters' tunnels, some of which have cut entirely through them.

Structure 7 is located at the northern end of the causeway, near the edge of the northern swamp.

Structure 33 displays especially fine quality masonry.

Structure 42 is the tallest structure at Kinal, standing 23 metres (75 ft) high.

Structure 65 is situated in the South Plaza, located to the southwest of the acropolis. It is the largest building in a group of eight structures. Structure 65 is a palace-type building and is well preserved, consisting of a multi-room structure standing on top of a sizeable basal platform. The building covers an area of approximately 1,000 square metres (11,000 sq ft) and stands alone facing south onto a plaza also bordered by Structures 64 and 66. Structure 65 measures 64 by 24 metres (210 by 79 ft) and contains 16 rooms. It is possible that Structure 65 may have served a residential, administrative or ceremonial purpose but the most likely use was as an elite residence housing members of the priesthood or nobility.
