= List of rivers of Belize =

Rivers of Belize / rivers of Strahler orders 4 and 5 labelled / via WWF and Natural Earth base maps

These are the main rivers of Belize. Belize has a total of 35 major and minor river catchments or watersheds which drain into the Caribbean Sea.

== Rivers ==
| Name | District | Parent |
|---|---|---|
| Belize River | BZ, CY | Caribbean Sea |
| Barton Creek | CY | Belize River |
| Beaver Dam Creek | CY | Belize River |
| Billy White Creek | CY | Belize River |
| Black Creek | BZ | Belize River |
| Cadena Creek | CY | Belize River |
| Cut and Throwaway Creek | CY | Belize River |
| Iguana Creek | CY | Belize River |
| Santa Teresa Creek | CY | Iguana Creek |
| Jinny Creek | CY | Belize River |
| Labouring Creek | CY | Belize River |
| Freshwater Creek | CY | Labouring Creek |
| Yalbac Creek | CY | Labouring Creek |
| Pescado Creek | CY | Yalbac Creek |
| Tu-tu Creek | CY | Pescado Creek |
| Little Barton Creek | CY | Belize River |
| Macal River | CY | Belize River |
| Blossom Berry Creek | CY | Macal River |
| Cacao Camp Creek | CY | Macal River |
| Eastern Branch | CY | Macal River |
| Garbutt Creek | CY | Macal River |
| Mahogany Creek | CY | Macal River |
| Mengel Creek | CY | Macal River |
| Mollejon Creek | CY | Macal River |
| Monkey Trail Branch | CY | Macal River |
| Raspaculo | CY | Macal River |
| Rio Frio | CY | Macal River |
| Rainbow Creek | CY | Rio Frio |
| Rio On | CY | Macal River |
| Pinol Creek | CY | Rio On |
| Privassion Creek | CY | Rio On |
| Little Vaqueros Creek | CY | Privassion Creek |
| Oak Burn | CY | Privassion Creek |
| Slate Creek | CY | Macal River |
| Mopan River | CY | Belize River |
| Chiquibul River | CY | Mopan River |
| Rio Ceiba Grande | CY | Mopan River |
| Mussel Creek | BZ | Belize River |
| Cox Lagoon Creek | BZ | Mussel Creek |
| Pescado Creek | CY | Belize River |
| Quaco Creek | CY | Belize River |
| Roaring Creek | CY | Belize River |
| Red Creek | CY | Roaring Creek |
| Spring Creek | CY | Roaring Creek |
| Rock Dondo Creek | CY | Belize River |
| Saturday Creek | CY | Belize River |
| Spanish Creek | BZ | Belize River |
| Tu-tu Creek | CY | Belize River |
| Yalbac Creek | CY | Belize River |
| New River | CZL, OW | Corozal Bay |
| Coffin Gate Creek | OW | New River |
| Dawson Creek | OW | New River |
| Irish Creek | OW | New River |
| Ramgoat Creek | OW | New River |
| Northern River | BZ | Caribbean Sea |
| Lopez Creek | BZ | Northern River |
| Quashie Banner Creek | BZ | Northern River |
| Rio Hondo | CZL, OW | Bahia de Chetumal |
| Blue Creek | OW | Rio Hondo |
| Booth's River | OW | Rio Hondo |
| Chan Chich Creek | OW | Rio Hondo |
| Gold Button Creek | OW | Rio Hondo |
| La Palma | | Rio Hondo |
| Rio Bravo | OW | Rio Hondo |
| Sibun River | BZ, CY | Caribbean Sea |
| Boom Creek | BZ | Sibun River |
| Caves Branch River | CY | Sibun River |
| Hector Creek | BZ | Sibun River |
| Indian Creek | CY | Sibun River |
| Runaway Creek | CY | Sibun River |
| Silver Creek | CY | Sibun River |
| Yaha Creek | CY | Sibun River |

== Resources ==
- Boles, Ed (1999). The Sibun River Watershed Atlas. Sibun River Watershed Association.
- "The rivers of Belize with their tributaries". belizerivers.org. Archived from the original on 5 February 2006.
- "Watersheds". Belmopan: Biodiversity & Environmental Resource Data System of Belize (BERDS). Archived from the original on 18 April 2012. (includes map of watersheds)
