= Extreme Cuisine with Jeff Corwin =

- Starring: Jeff Corwin
- Country of origin: United States
- No. of episodes: 12

Production
- Executive producers: Mark Dissin and Bob Tuschman
- Running time: 30 minutes

Original release
- Network: Cooking Channel

Extreme Cuisine with Jeff Corwin is a television show where host Jeff Corwin travels to various parts of the world and samples diverse, local foods and learns about the various methods of preparation and attainment of foods.
