= Jeff Corwin =

American biologist

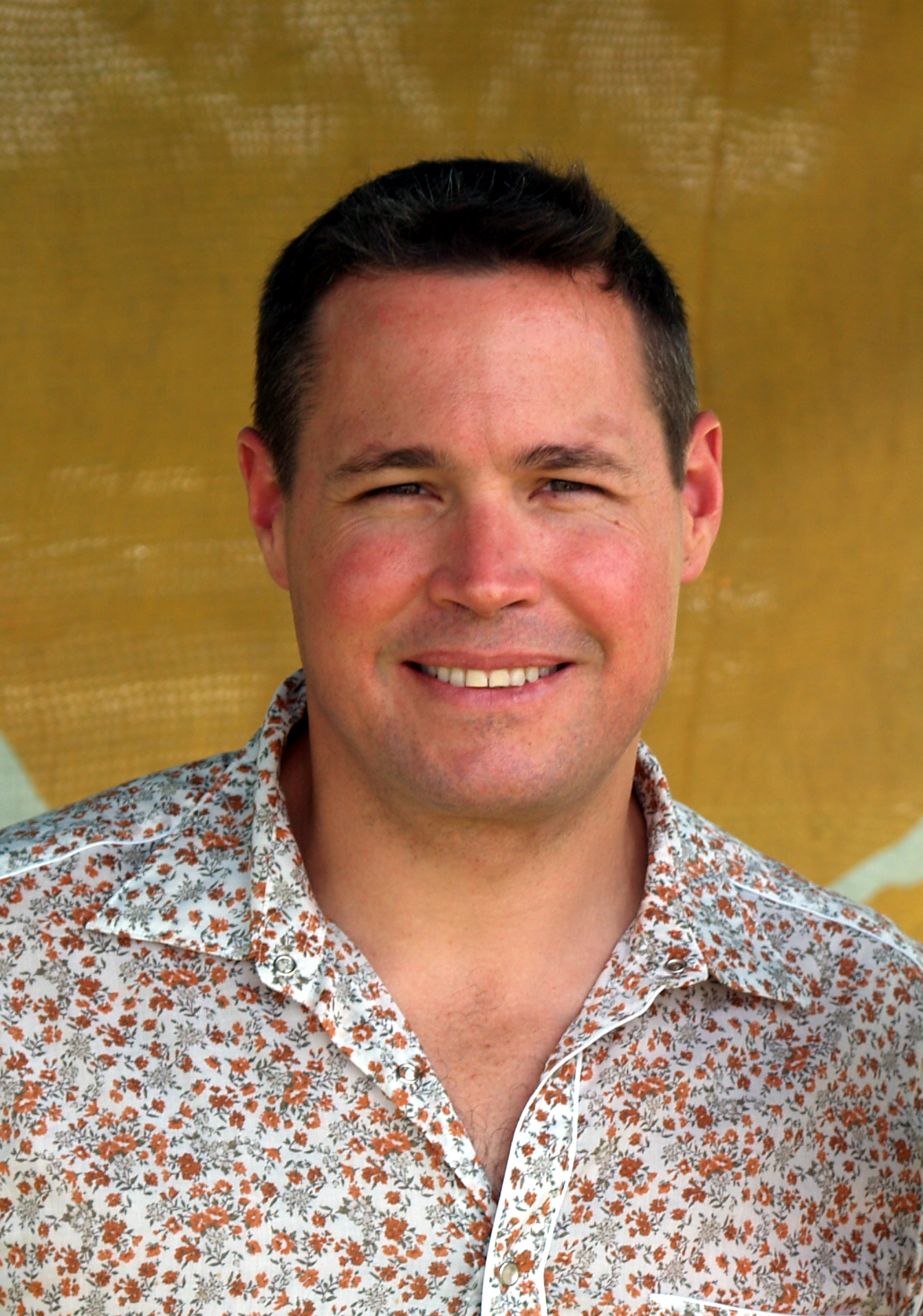
- Corwin in 2006
- Born: Jeffrey Corwin; July 11, 1967 (age 59); Norwell, Massachusetts, U.S.
- Education: Bridgewater State University (BS); University of Massachusetts Amherst (MS)
- Occupations: Conservationist, biologist, executive producer
- Spouse: Natasha Soultanova-Corwin
- Children: 2

Jeffrey Corwin (born July 11, 1967) is an American biologist and wildlife conservationist, known for hosting Disney Channel's Going Wild with Jeff Corwin, The Jeff Corwin Experience on Animal Planet, ABC's Ocean Mysteries with Jeff Corwin/Ocean Treks with Jeff Corwin and Wildlife Nation with Jeff Corwin.

== Biography ==
=== Early years ===
Corwin was born on July 11, 1967, in Norwell, Massachusetts, where he attended Norwell High School, then went on to spend his freshman year of college at the Eastern Nazarene College, in Quincy, Massachusetts. Later he attended Bridgewater State University in Bridgewater. He conducted his graduate studies at the University of Massachusetts Amherst, obtaining a Master of Science in wildlife and fisheries conservation and doing work on bats and snakes. In 1999, Bridgewater awarded Corwin an honorary doctorate in public education. Corwin was also certified as an Advanced Field Medical Specialist by the United States Army Medical Department Center and School, Fort Sam Houston, Texas.

==== Conservation ====
Jeff Corwin speaks about sea turtle nest excavation in Gulf Shores, Alabama, in 2010

Corwin first experienced the tropical rain forests in 1984 in Belize. As an undergraduate, he became active in the conservation of rain forests in Central and South America. He also participated in the youth action committee for the United Nations Environmental Program.

In 1993, Corwin addressed the General Assembly of the United Nations regarding the need to conserve neotropical rain forests. Corwin lectures on wildlife, gold mining, ecology, and conservation to audiences throughout the United States.

==== Television ====
In 1994, Corwin served as expedition naturalist for the documentary series titled The JASON Project, led by oceanographer Bob Ballard and sponsored in part by National Geographic. From 1997 to 1999 Corwin hosted a show for the Disney Channel titled Going Wild with Jeff Corwin. From 2001 to 2005 Corwin partnered with Animal Planet and Discovery Communications, serving as host and executive producer of two series, The Jeff Corwin Experience from 2000 until 2003 and Corwin's Quest that ran for a single season in 2005 and 2006.

In 2003, Corwin appeared in an episode of the crime drama CSI: Miami. In the episode, he played himself, portrayed as a former classmate of Eric Delko, played by Adam Rodriguez. Titled "Death Grip", Corwin helped detectives retrieve a human foot from inside a live crocodile. In 2003 Corwin hosted a television documentary for Animal Planet titled Giant Monsters.

In the spring of 2007, Corwin began a new TV show on the Travel Channel titled Into Alaska with Jeff Corwin. Also, in 2007, Corwin was sponsored by CNN to be an environment correspondent for an Anderson Cooper 360 special called Planet in Peril, along with co-host Sanjay Gupta.

In 2009, Corwin partnered with Defenders of Wildlife to host the documentary series Feeling the Heat. In 2009 Corwin also hosted a television special for MSNBC with the same title of his book Future Earth: 100 Heartbeats. Corwin has been on expeditions to six of the seven continents—all except Antarctica.

In 2011, during the tsunami in Japan, Corwin was used as a geologist on MSNBC to help explain the tsunami. The same year, he voiced an alligator expert in an episode of The Hub's Pound Puppies. In 2012, Corwin starred in a Claritin commercial as himself.

From 2011 to 2016, Corwin hosted and was an executive producer on the ABC Weekend Adventure wildlife adventure series Ocean Mysteries with Jeff Corwin. The series won Outstanding Travel Program in the 41st Daytime Creative Arts Emmy Awards in 2014, and Corwin won a Daytime Emmy Award for Outstanding Lifestyle/Travel/Children's Series Host in 2016.

In October 2016, ABC began showing the global cruising series, Ocean Treks with Jeff Corwin, which involves ecology. Five years later, he launched his current series Wildlife Nation with Jeff Corwin. It is presented by Defenders of Wildlife.

==== Close encounter with elephant ====
In filming a segment of CNN's Planet in Peril with Anderson Cooper at Phnom Tamao Wildlife Rescue Center near Phnom Penh, Cambodia, on March 22, 2007, Corwin was the victim of a playful elephant. This rough-play consisted of the elephant putting Corwin's elbow in its mouth and wrapping its trunk around his arm, and swinging him around. He yelled as the elephant shook its head, releasing and throwing Corwin into the shallow water in which they were standing. Corwin noted that the pain was so overwhelming that he nearly blacked out, and that his arm still does not work correctly. Corwin later posted the following summary of injuries that resulted:

To this day my arm doesn't work right. We tend to look at elephants as these very kind gentle giants, like Dumbo and Jumbo from the cartoons. But the truth is, elephants are complex mammals with a huge array of emotions, from happiness to anger to jealousy, and when I turned away, this was his way of telling me he didn't want to be ignored. The trunk of an elephant can lift a 900-pound tree limb. You do not want to be that close to one when he's having a bad moment.

Truth is that elephants are easily 15,000 times stronger than my meager self, and if she had wanted to, she could have done far worse than crushing a bit of ligament and muscle. Lucky for me, no bone fracture, hopefully no connective tissue torn (we'll have to wait till I get home to find out about that).

== Personal life ==
Corwin lives in Marshfield, Massachusetts, with his wife Natasha and their two daughters: Maya Rose (b. July 6, 2003) and Marina (b. September 11, 2008).

He is of Hungarian and Romanian ancestry on his father's side.

== Filmography ==
- Going Wild with Jeff Corwin: Disney Channel 1997–1999.
- The Jeff Corwin Experience: Animal Planet 2000–2003.
- Death Grip: CSI Miami 2003.
- Giant Monsters: Animal Planet 2003.
- Jeff Corwin Unleashed: Discovery Kids Channel 2003.
- King of the Jungle: Animal Planet 2003–2004.
- Corwin's Quest: Animal Planet 2005–2006.
- Into America's West: Travel Channel 2008.
- Into Alaska: Travel Channel 2007.
- Feeling the Heat: Partnered with Defenders of Wildlife 2009.
- Future Earth: 100 Heartbeats: MSNBC 2009.
- Extreme Cuisine with Jeff Corwin: Food Network 2009–10.
- Ocean Mysteries with Jeff Corwin: ABC 2011–2016.
- Ocean Treks with Jeff Corwin: ABC 2016–2020.
- Expedition Chesapeake: Whitaker Center Productions 2019.
- Wildlife Nation with Jeff Corwin: ABC 2021–2026
- Extraordinary World with Jeff Corwin: CBS 2025.
- Jeff Corwin's Southern Wild: ABC 2026.
