= La Unión, Quintana Roo =

La Unión
- Location within Quintana Roo
- Coordinates: 17°53′50″N 88°52′50″W
- Country: Mexico
- State: Quintana Roo
- Municipality: Othón P. Blanco
- Elevation: 13 m (43 ft)

Population (2020)
  - Total: 1,104
- Time zone: UTC-5 (Eastern Time Zone)
- Postal code: 77992
- Area code: 983

La Unión is a pueblo (village) located in the municipality of Othón P. Blanco in the state of Quintana Roo, Mexico.

== Geography ==
La Unión is located on the left bank of the Hondo River, geographically located between 17º53'50 "N and 88º52'50" W, at about 13 meters above sea level. The village has a border port that connects with neighboring Blue Creek Village, Belize. There is an international bridge that connects both localities.
