= Río Azul =

Mayan archaeological site in Petén Department, Guatemala

Coordinates: 17°46′44.7″N 89°16′48.0″W

Río Azul is an archaeological site of the Pre-Columbian Maya civilization. It is the most important site in the Río Azul National Park in the Petén Department of northern Guatemala, close to the borders of Mexico and Belize. Río Azul is situated to the southeast of the Azul river and its apogee dates to the Early Classic period (c. AD 250–600).

The earliest major architecture dates to around 500 BC, in the Late Preclassic period (c. 350 BC – AD 250). In the late 4th century AD Río Azul was dominated by the city of Tikal and its great central Mexican ally Teotihuacan. Tikal used Río Azul to secure an important trade route to the Caribbean Sea and challenge Calakmul, its great rival. The city was largely abandoned in the 6th century but saw a resurgence in the Late Classic (c. AD 600–900), probably as a result of repopulation by Kinal.

== Location ==
The ruins are situated immediately southeast of the Río Azul ("Blue River") upon a low ridge in the extreme northeast of the department of Petén. Río Azul is bounded on the eastern side by interconnected linear structures and by swamps. The southern boundary is formed by an artificially modified gully. The site is 12 kilometres (7.5 mi) to the north of the Late Classic ruins of Kinal, 20 kilometres (12 mi) west of the Early to Late Classic ruins of La Milpa, and 60 kilometres (37 mi) northeast of Tikal. Río Azul's location ensured that it controlled a trade route along a tributary of the Hondo River, which was an important route to the Caribbean Sea.

== Population ==
The city reached its maximum population during between AD 390 and 540, when it had about 3500 inhabitants. The ruling elite lived in palace complexes within the site core; their households consisted of extended families with their servants. The population was concentrated almost entirely within the city with a population density of 2,700 people/km^{2} (7,000 people/mi^{2}). Farmers and labourers made up 31% and 57% of the population respectively and were subject to feudal obligations to their overlords. The unusual highly nucleated population pattern has been attributed to Río Azul's status as a frontier fortress. During the site's Late Classic resurgence the rural population density in the once-peripheral BA-20 group reached approximately 300/km^{2} (777/square mile). Between AD 692 and 830 the total population at Río Azul once again peaked at around 3500, with 2500 of these in the BA-20 zone.

== Rulers ==
An individual nicknamed Six Sky by archaeologists was a prominent ruler of Río Azul in the early 5th century AD. It has been speculated that Six Sky was the son of Siyaj Chan K'awiil II, a king of Tikal.

== History ==
Río Azul was first settled in the Middle Preclassic (c. 1000–350 BC) around 900 BC and underwent a period of notable expansion during the Late Preclassic, at which time a number of monumental temples were built. These have been dated to around 500 BC. In the Preclassic the population was spread out along the east bank of the river; in the Late Preclassic the population began to concentrate on the ridge, and this continued into the Early Classic period.

In the late 4th century AD Río Azul came to be dominated by the city of Tikal. Scenes depicting the sacrifice of at least eight nobles are sculpted on a series of three circular altars dated to AD 385; this has been interpreted as the sacrifice of the local elite after a takeover by Tikal and its Teotihuacano allies. The Teotihuacan warlord Siyaj K'ak' is mentioned in an inscription at Río Azul dated to AD 393, during the reign of king Yax Nuun Ayiin I at Tikal. The military costume of Yax Nuun Ayiin I depicted on monuments at both Tikal and Río Azul, combined with a number of hieroglyphic texts, links the Tikal king with the political events at Río Azul at this time. Tikal's dominance over Río Azul at this time would have secured an important trade route to the Caribbean and would have challenged Calakmul, Tikal's great rival, which would have used the Hondo river for its own route to the sea. This incursion into Calakmul's sphere of influence provoked a period of fierce rivalry between the two powers that ultimately led to the downfall of Río Azul. During the Early Classic, the nearby site of La Milpa was probably subject to Río Azul.

The city underwent a pronounced decline in the 6th century, towards the end of the Early Classic, and it may even have been abandoned at this time. This period corresponds to a period of conflict between Tikal and Calakmul during which there is evidence of deliberate destruction at Río Azul. The city was probably overrun by Calakmul due to its alliance with Tikal and its influence over the trade route to the Caribbean. The site was resettled during the Late Classic; this was probably overseen by Kinal. The population was concentrated in the residential areas and there was little new construction. Ceramic finds at Río Azul demonstrate that Maya trade routes still ran through the city in the 9th century, however the city was completely abandoned by AD 880.

=== Modern history ===
The ruins were discovered in 1962 by Trinidad Pech; soon after their discovery a number of elite tombs were plundered by looters. The looters dug large trenches cutting through the most important temples; at the height of the looting in the late 1970s as many as 80 workers were employed, funded by a wealthy private collector. Archaeologist Ian Graham travelled to Río Azul in 1981 to follow up rumours of the looting and document the damage; as a result of his survey the Guatemalan government stationed custodians at the site. Richard Adams started formal investigations of Río Azul in 1983, beginning the five-year Río Azul Project, which finished in 1987. The project investigated and documented more than 125 looters' trenches and tunnels.

== Site description ==
The site covers an area of approximately 1.3 square kilometres (0.50 sq mi) and includes approximately 729 major structures dating from the 5th to 6th centuries AD; the densest concentration of substantial structures is clustered within the central 0.5 square kilometres (0.19 sq mi) of the site core; the tallest temple stands 15 metres (49 ft) high. The principal architecture was erected under the supervision of the dynasty installed by Tikal and its Teotihuacan allies. Teotihuacan-influences architectural elements include the talud-tablero style. The main architectural groups of the site core were connected by a series of paved plazas and causeways. Minor palaces and residential complexes were scattered amongst the major groups. Río Azul possesses nine major architectural groups in its site core, each including an elite residential complex and its associated funerary pyramids. The city possesses 39 formal courtyards with their associated architectural complexes. Three chultunob (subterranean storage chambers) were found within the site core.

Structure A-3 was a large temple. Three inscribed altars dating to the Early Classic were found buried under it; they depicted scenes of human sacrifice. The temple was built during Río Azul's apogee between 390 and 530.

=== BA-20 Group ===
The BA-20 Group is situated a few kilometers to the northeast of the site core and includes four platforms dating to the Late Preclassic. The group was already abandoned by the time Río Azul reached its maximum extent; no Early Classic remains have been found in the vicinity of BA-20. The group was reinhabited during the Late Classic, with the general repopulation of Río Azul and the group is estimated to have housed some 2500 people between the AD 692 and 830. The total area covered by the group is estimated to be 7 to 8 square kilometres (2.7 to 3.1 sq mi), of which mapping and test excavations covered just 0.8 square kilometres (0.31 sq mi). In the mapped area, archaeologists recorded 275 structures and 30 chultunob. Almost all of the architecture within the group is domestic in nature and the likely food-storage function of the chultunob supports the interpretation of the group as principally residential in nature.

=== Monuments ===
Stela 1 was associated with Structure A-3. It is inscribed with a date equivalent to AD 392 and mentions one of Río Azul's kings. By the 9th century AD the stela had been enclosed within a shrine; the shrine was half filled with broken pottery around AD 850; this was symptomatic of a calamitous regional event that quickly eliminated elite Maya culture in the region. Stela 1 faces west and has a total height of 5.4 metres (18 ft) including the 0.9 metres (3.0 ft) buried portion of the shaft; it measures 1.3 metres (4.3 ft) wide by 0.6 metres (2.0 ft) thick. The monument is sculpted on three sides and has traces of red paint.

Stela 2 dates to the Late Classic and includes a hieroglyphic text that mentions an elite visitor from La Milpa, at a time when Río Azul was long past its peak. It was found associated with Structure B-XI and faces south. It measures 3.3 metres (11 ft) high including the buried portion, which measures 0.6 metres (2.0 ft). The monument is 1.2 metres (3.9 ft) wide and 0.6 metres (2.0 ft) thick and is sculpted on all four faces. It has traces of red and green pigments. The monument was dedicated in AD 690 and mentions the birth of a ruler of Río Azul in 661.

Stela 3 dates to the Early Classic and was associated with Structure F1. It measures 3.2 metres (10 ft) high, with 2.3 metres (7.5 ft) of this above ground. The monument is 1.1 metres (3.6 ft) wide and 0.6 metres (2.0 ft) thick. It faces west and is sculpted on three faces. The stela still has traces of red paint. Stela 3 was already badly damaged when it was discovered in 1983. Although no hieroglyphic text survives on the monument, the position on the monument of a figure with the feet pointing to the left is typical of Early Classic monuments.

Stela 4 was dedicated around AD 840. This monument has been associated with the Puuc Maya by investigator Richard E. W. Adams.

=== Tombs ===
The site is known for a number of ornate tombs, some of which are corbel-vaulted. The tombs were excavated out of the limestone bedrock and the walls were painted red and black. A number of tomb chambers were uncovered under Structure A-3 by looters who removed most of the tomb contents. The chamber walls were painted with hieroglyphic texts. More than thirty tombs have been investigated by archaeologists at Río Azul, all dated to a period spanning a few centuries from the Late Preclassic to the Early Classic periods. Watery imagery is prominent in the royal tombs, linked to the descent of the deceased's soul into the underworld.

Tomb 1 was inserted into Structure C-1. Although it was looted it contains fine examples of elaborate Early Classic murals and includes a Long Count date of 8.19.1.9.13, equivalent to a date in September 417. The walls of the tomb were coated with plaster, painted a red hematite pigment and decorated with hieroglyphs. The hieroglyphic text in the tomb proclaimed the royal Tikal ancestry of its occupant. As the occupant's name is unknown, they are currently referred to with the designation "Ruler X".

Tomb 12 is located under Structure A-3. It has walls painted with Maya script that includes mention of a person called Six Sky, his death or entombment in 450 and the Río Azul Emblem glyph. The corpse of the deceased was positioned in the centre of the tomb with glyphs for each of the cardinal directions painted upon the corresponding walls, thus positioning him at the centre of the world.

Tomb 19 was found intact; it contained fine textiles and Teotihuacan-influenced ceramics, including tripod cylinder vessels of a type common on the Gulf Coast and at Teotihuacan itself. Some of the ceramic vessels were found to contain traces of cacao and one of them was decorated with a hieroglyphic text describing its function and naming its owner. The tomb's occupant is believed to have been a native of Teotihuacan.

Tomb 23 is believed to have been the tomb of a native of Teotihuacan. Like Tomb 19, it also contained Teotihuacan-style tripod cylinder vessels.

== Artifacts ==
A number of ceramic pots have been recovered from Río Azul that were used for cacao. One of the pots includes hieroglyphs identifying it specifically as a "cacao pot", and cacao residue has been found in a number of other vessels. Finds at Río Azul include a screw-top chocolate pot.

A looted jade mask has been found to be inscribed with hieroglyphs naming the same king as is mentioned on Stela 1 together with a truncated version of the Río Azul emblem glyph.
