= Planet in Peril =

- Starring: Anderson Cooper; Jeff Corwin; Sanjay Gupta; Lisa Ling
- Country of origin: United States
- No. of episodes: 3

Original release
- Network: CNN
- Release: October 23, 2007 – December 11, 2008

Planet in Peril is a two-part, four-hour documentary on CNN that premiered on October 23, 2007, broadcast in the CNN Presents format. It also aired as a special presentation on December 2 and 3, 2007 on Animal Planet & Animal Planet HD. CNN's Anderson Cooper, Sanjay Gupta and Animal Planet's Jeff Corwin investigate the current state of our planet, focusing on four major areas: global warming, overpopulation, deforestation and species loss.

They report from a wide variety of locations including Alaska, Brazil, Madagascar, Southeast Asia, and Yellowstone National Park, examining the effects of population growth, rising temperatures, poaching and illegal wildlife trade, among others, on the global environment.

Specific areas it deals with are the conflict in the Niger Delta (oil exploitation) and La Oroya, Peru (industrial pollution).

On December 11, 2008, CNN premiered a sequel to Planet in Peril, called Planet in Peril: Battle Lines. It featured Anderson Cooper, Sanjay Gupta, and Lisa Ling from National Geographic Explorer.
