= Corwin's Quest =

American television program

Corwin's Quest is an American wildlife documentary television program that aired on Animal Planet in 2005 and 2006. The show was similar to The Crocodile Hunter and was hosted by actor and conservationist Jeff Corwin from The Jeff Corwin Experience. Music composed by Rich Stubbings.

== Episode guide ==
- Episode 1 — The Alligator's Bellow (Sound)
  Original Air Date: June 15, 2005
- Episode 2 — The Camel's Hump (Extremes)
  Original Air Date: June 22, 2005
- Episode 3 — The Bear's Hunger (Diet)
  Original Air Date: June 29, 2005
- Episode 4 — The Crocodile's Element (Locomotion)
  Original Air Date: July 6, 2005
- Episode 5 — The Chimp's Politics (Teamwork)
  Original Air Date: July 13, 2005
- Episode 6 — The Sardine's Run (Defense)
  Original Air Date: August 10, 2005
- Episode 7 — The Elephant's Trunk (Smell)
  Original Air Date: August 31, 2005
- Episode 8 — The Blue Whale's Tail (Giants)
  Original Air Date: October 12, 2005
- Episode 9 — The Eagle's View (Sight)
  Original Air Date: October 21, 2005
- Episode 10 — The Lion's Pounce (Hunters)
  Original Air Date: October 28, 2005
- Episode 11 — The Puma's Prowess (Survival)
  Original Air Date: December 4, 2005
- Episode 12 — The Falcon's Swoop (Speed)
  Original Air Date: January 8, 2006
- Episode 13 — The Shark's Jaws (Attack)
  Original Air Date: January 15, 2006

== Reception ==
Common Sense Media rated the show 4 out of 5 stars.
