= Omba Mokomba =

- Original series title card for Omba Mokomba
- Genre: Wildlife documentary
- Written by: Mack Anderson; Kevin Indigaro; Murray Valeriano
- Directed by: Peter Foldy
- Presented by: Benjamin Brown
- Country of origin: United States
- Original language: English
- No. of episodes: 27

Production
- Executive producers: Bradley Anderson; Mack Anderson
- Producers: Brad Bishop; R.P. Sekon
- Running time: 30 minutes
- Production company: Popular Arts Entertainment

Original release
- Network: Disney Channel
- Release: 1997 – 1999

Omba Mokomba is an American wildlife documentary television series that aired on Disney Channel from 1997 to 1999. The series was described as "The station for animal information!", and its stated intent was to answer viewer questions about animals and wildlife. The show was generally well-received for its educational value and positivity.

== History ==
The show was first announced in an August 1997, as "part of a one-hour wildlife themed block" with another nature-oriented new Disney show, Going Wild with Jeff Corwin. and was featured at that time in an article in the Disney Channel's Behind the Ears magazine. It was part of a "makeover" of Disney Channel premium service original programming designed to "provide families with more shared-viewing opportunities and to give them 'creative properties that are meaningful and relevant to their lives'". The title is Swahili for "Ask Mokomba", and the Disney Channel was noted to be "surely the only channel this side of public access to title a program in Swahili". Disney Channel executive Rich Ross commented on the Swahili title that "If we can have 'Hakuna Matata', we can have 'Omba Mokomba'", referencing the popularity of the song from The Lion King, which had been released three years earlier.

The cast of Omba Mokomba included three main characters: the title character Mokomba ("an African broadcaster and zoological expert"; portrayed by Benjamin Brown), Candace, (show producer; Natasha Pearce), and Mr. Plunkett (a Capuchin monkey, added in the second season). The show-within-a-show motif depicted Mokomba as broadcasting from a hut in Africa, answering viewer questions about a wide variety of animal life, while navigating occasional subplots such as being forced to share the space with another show (a fictional Hut Improvement), or playing pranks on his co-worker. Other segments included fake commercials and "parodies of adult television", such as a segment on cats in the style of the reality TV show, Cops.

== Reception ==
A critique of the show found it to be cheerful and educational, but very fast-paced, with an excessive number of segments, which the reviewer found made the information difficult to fully take in.

In 1999, the Annenberg Public Policy Center deemed Omba Mokomba "high quality" children's programming, and expressed disappointment that it was one of only a handful of shows of this kind shown during prime time television hours. A 2001 scholarly piece found it to be one of several examples of "prosocial" programming "designed to foster intellectual activity, tolerance, friendliness, and so on". In 2020, the show was among a number of shows that fans petitioned Disney to make available on Disney+.

== Characters ==
- Mokomba: (Benjamin Brown); Brown, born in Atlanta, Georgia in 1968, had previously appeared in small roles in films and television series like Fired. After Omba Mokomba ended, Brown later appeared in Bellum Entertainment Group's syndicated series Safari Tracks in the similar role of Ushaka, a South African zoological protector and expert. Unlike Omba Mokomba, however, Safari Tracks was filmed in Africa. Brown was a repeat guest star on The West Wing and In Justice, and also appeared in Star Trek: Deep Space Nine, Without a Trace, The Practice, The Suite Life of Zack & Cody and Frasier.
- Candace: (Natasha Pearce); before appearing on Omba Mokomba, Pearce, originally from New York's Staten Island, has been a star of the TV series Roundhouse.
- Mr. Plunkett: (Binx); a Capuchin monkey.
