= Ruler X (Rio Azul) =

Ruler X (also Governor X) is the designation given by archaeologists to a pre-Columbian Maya ruler at the site of Rio Azul, whose name glyphs have otherwise not been satisfactorily deciphered. Ruler X is associated with Tomb 1 located in Structure C-1, where a mural inscription on the walls of the tomb carries the Long Count date of 8.19.1.9.13. This date, equivalent to September 27, 417 CE in the proleptic Gregorian calendar, has been interpreted as the birth date of this ruler.
