= La Milpa =

Maya archaeological site in Belize

Coordinates: 17.7833°N 88.9500°W

La Milpa is an archaeological site and an ancient Maya city within the Three River region of Northwest Belize bordering Mexico and Guatemala. La Milpa is located between the sites of Rio Azul and Lamanai. Currently, La Milpa lies within the nature preserve owned by the Programme for Belize, a non-profit organization. PfB acquired land for the preserve from the Coco-Cola Company, who purchased land in Belize in 1988 with the goals of tearing down the rainforest to create a citrus plantation, however donated the land to Conservation and Management Project in 1990 and 1992. Following Caracol and Lamanai, La Milpa is the third largest site in Belize with the Main Plaza alone covering 18,000 square meters, making it one of the largest in the entire Maya region.

== Research History ==
This site was first discovered in March 1938 by Sir J. Eric S. Thompson. Thompson’s work at La Milpa entailed mapping and excavating the Main Center, recording a total of 12 different stelae. Thompson noted that there was a line of stelae along the Great Plaza, however they were badly weathered. These stelae were made of a soft limestone that came from the bedrock within the PfB area. According to Nikolai Grube, the composition of this material accounted for why the stelae were so eroded. Nonetheless, Thompson was able read a date on Stela 7 of 9.17.10.0.0. (November 30, 780). Thompson’s work was short lived at La Milpa however, due a bout of dysentery that cut his season short.

After Thompson, La Milpa was not explored again until the 1970s, when David M. Pendergast and Stanley Loten conducted a field project at the site. Their work largely centered on adding to the existing map of the main plaza. After Pendergast and Loten, two archaeologists in 1979 from the Department of Archaeology in Belmopan went to La Milpa to confirm reports of looting. Their surveys confirmed that the site had been heavily looted. In 1985, the Department of Archaeology revisited La Milpa again because of reports of looting and additionally due to the speculation of the presence of marijuana fields. On this expedition, they confirmed both reports, noting that all the main structures within the site center had large trenches revealing older constructions and/or tombs.

Archaeological research continued at La Milpa in 1988 when two different groups each with different objectives started investigations. The first group, The Rio Bravo Project, went to sketch the site center. The second group, the PfB, went to research the site for the potential ability to contribute to the archaeological record. The mapping done during these investigations showed the Main Plaza, the outlying courtyards and the location of stelae, as well as the trenches from looting.

Thomas Guderjan, who was part of the original exploration by the Rio Bravo Project, returned in February 1990 to continue mapping the site and the outlying areas. Within this field season, Guderjan produced maps of four plazas, 20 residential courtyards, and 85 structures. While all these occur within a 1 km by .5 km area, Guderjan inferred that site could have had as many as 24 to 30 different courtyards. Guderjan also renumbered the stelae, however LaMAP and other scholars have since utilized Thompson’s original numbering. In February 1992, Boston University and the La Milpa Archaeological Project (LaMAP) started extensive excavations and mapping of the site.

=== LaMAP ===
The first field season in 1992, under the direction of Dr. Norman Hammond and Dr. Gair Tourtellot, utilized multiple different fields of study including epigraphy, mapping, and excavations, to gain as much data as possible. The LaMAP project only holds a permit to excavate within a 6 km radius from the site center. Consequently, the excavations outside of this region were part of a different project directed by Dr. Richard E. W. Adams of the University of Texas at San Antonio and later by Dr. Fred Valdez of University of Texas at Austin, under the Programme for Belize Archaeological Project (PfBAP).

Research within the first years was conducted at four main areas. The first being the La Milpa Center (LMC), second the three radiating radial transects from LMC, the third area consisting of four minor plazas, and finally, the fourth consisting of 15 random 250m by 250m survey blocks. Additional research has been research conducted by the Ancient Maya Land and Water Use Project, which has investigated the water drainage from the site center outwards.

== Site Layout ==
The site is situated on a ridge roughly 1 km across, running from North to South, with the drainage going to the western side. There are no natural water sources within the site, however there are two large aguadas that would have held water through the dry season. While there are no other permanent water sources, in 1992 Vernon L. Scarborough investigated the possibility of two other reservoirs which were initially stone quarries thought to retain water.

The site is structured with the Petén-centric site plan, meaning a northern grouping of buildings surrounding the main plaza (Plaza A). This plaza is over 18,000 square meters and could have held upwards of 17,000 people. On the eastern side of this plaza are the construction of three large pyramid temples surrounding a fourth in the center in the middle of the plaza. The southern part of the plaza consists of a range of building while the northern part contains low walls that make up the northwest corner of the plaza.

South of the Great Plaza, lies another group of buildings, which consist of three open plazas with enclosed courtyards. This area had only one pyramid and no stelae or altars. This area was not of interest until later in the project when research goals did include the southern region of the site center as well as the hinterlands that were within the 6 km radius from the center.

== Site History ==
=== Late Preclassic/ Early Classic 400 BC- AD 500 ===
During the Late Preclassic and Early Classic La Milpa was a small site located on a hilltop consisting of a few pyramids, one reservoir, and a few stelae. Excavations within Plaza A revealed a few monuments that date to this period indicating a growing population and therefore a need for increased space. The northern plaza was also occupied during this period. It was the foci of funerary monumental construction, which has led to the interpretation the dead were buried near the main population. The only other signs of occupation during this time can be seen in the alteration of the surrounding landscapes, such as construction of terraces.

These changes may have occurred to do that advent of kingship and elite classes during the Late Preclassic. In addition, the archaeological record suggests that the Maya divinity controlled the population and therefore, the population was concentrated around the center monumental constructions. While these changes occurred fairly rapidly, the population and site stayed small and concentrated.

During the Early Classic Period La Milpa saw significant growth in the production of monumental constructions the site center. The stelae also reflected change, indicating a shift towards political states with institutionalized royalty and a strong stable political system. These changes reflect the growing political complexity as resource management became a tool of the state due to the increasing population density. In particular, power was negotiated by rulership through the ability to control the agriculture and the environment. Despite the growth of the site population and density during the Early Classic Period, La Milpa was able to sustain a large population; however, there is a marked pause in the culturalism of the Maya within this region during the Middle Classic Period.

=== Middle Classic AD 550 - 700 ===
The Middle Classic Period is marked by a decline in culture and populations within La Milpa and the other Three River sites. This change can be attributed to the population shift that occurred within the Three Rivers Basin due to the ongoing conflict between larger cities such as Tikal, Caracol, and Calakmul. The region saw a decline in both in populations and the controlling elite power. This “cultural pausing” can be seen in the archaeological record due to the lack of new monumental constructions and elite artworks. Stelae dedications ended with the advent of the Middle Classic Period and did not resume until the Late Classic Period during a cultural revival.

=== Late/Terminal Classic 700–850 ===
At La Milpa during the mid-8th century, there was a steep upward climb in the construction of monumental architecture and the dedication of stelae. This increase in activity can be directly related to the change in settlement patterns outside of the site core. The Petén-centric site plan became the site pattern for the main plaza of sites within the Three Rivers Basin. With this Petén-centric site plan, there is a regrowth in populations and elite centers.

Along with the change in site plan patterns, there is also the construction of two ballcourts within the site. These ballcourts were designed with a specific layout that would orient them from north to south and west to east. While there was a cultural revitalization and a burst in population, the revitalization only lasted for a short while. Following the revitalization in the Late Classic Period, La Milpa and the surrounding sites experienced decline and eventually collapse along with the rest of the Maya realm. The collapse at La Milpa appears to have been rapid as indicated by the partial completion of monumental constructions along with other signs of sudden abandonment in the archaeological record.

The site of La Milpa was occupied from the Pre-classic and Early Classic into the Late and Terminal Classic, reaching its peak during the Early Classic Period. La Milpa had intensive agriculture as indicated by extensive terraces. The site had a number of monumental constructions and other elite artworks, indicating centralized power. While the site has been subjected to numerous archaeological investigations, La Milpa remains largely unexplored.

== See also ==
- Maya Civilization
- List of Maya sites
- Preclassic Maya
