= Grounds Creek =

Stream in the U.S. state of Missouri

Grounds Creek also known as Grounder Creek is a stream in northwest Bollinger and eastern Madison counties in the U.S. state of Missouri. It is a tributary of the Castor River.

The stream headwaters arise in Bollinger County just south of Missouri Route 72 and it flows to the southwest into Madison County to enter the Castor River after passing under Missouri Route V and about 3.5 miles north of Marquand. The source is at 37°31′05″N 90°06′17″W and the confluence is at 37°28′40″N 90°11′07″W.

Grounds Creek has the name of a family of early settlers.

== See also ==
- List of rivers of Missouri
