= Blue Creek (Michigan) =

Stream in Berrien County, Michigan, U.S.

Coordinates: 42°08′55″N 86°24′30″W

Blue Creek is a stream in Berrien County, in the U.S. state of Michigan. It is a tributary to the Paw Paw River.

Blue Creek was so named on account of the blueish character of its water.
