= Baltimore Creek =

Stream in Missouri, U.S.

Coordinates: 37°30′52″N 90°01′52″W

Baltimore Creek is a stream in Bollinger County in the U.S. state of Missouri. It is a tributary of Little Whitewater Creek.

Baltimore Creek most likely was named after Baltimore, Maryland for unknown reasons.

== See also ==
- List of rivers of Missouri
