= Blue Creek (Conrad Creek tributary) =

Stream in the US state of Missouri

Coordinates: 37.585611°N 90.069278°W

Blue Creek is a stream in Bollinger County in the U.S. state of Missouri. It is a tributary of Conrad Creek.

Blue Creek was named for the blueish tint of its waters.

== See also ==
- List of rivers of Missouri
