= The Jeff Corwin Experience =

American TV wildlife documentary series

- Genre: Nature documentary Travel documentary
- Starring: Jeff Corwin
- No. of seasons: 3
- No. of episodes: 42

Original release
- Network: Animal Planet
- Release: December 7, 2000 – December 3, 2003

The Jeff Corwin Experience is an American wildlife documentary television program that premiered on the Animal Planet cable channel in 2000. It was hosted by actor and conservationist Jeff Corwin, who previously hosted Disney Channel's Going Wild with Jeff Corwin.

== Overview ==
In its initial season, the program included a cobra festival in India, jungles in Thailand, Borneo and the Galápagos Islands off the coast of Ecuador in South America. The following year, the program featured Guyana, Australia and Tanzania. In its third season in 2003, Mexico and Peru were included, as well as Kenya and Uganda in Africa. While the program includes some North American settings, segments have included all the other continents except Antarctica.

The program has educational value, but is produced to entertain as well, which would be suitable for science education in state schools. Jeff Corwin is often bitten or nearly bitten by the animals being described. Corwin also enjoys making numerous jokes and references to pop culture and movies.

Corwin was awarded an honorary doctorate degree in public education from Bridgewater State College. He has long been a proponent of rain forest preservation. Programs such as this and those of Steve Irwin and Terri Irwin (of The Crocodile Hunter) reflect a "human coexistence with wildlife approach" which is in sharp conflict with poachers and past practices in many parts of the world.

== Episodes ==
=== Season 1 (2000–01) ===
No.	Title	Original release date
1	"Borneo: A Wild Man in Borneo"	December 7, 2000
Jeff Corwin travels to the jungle island of Borneo.
2	"India: Riding the Cobra Express"	December 10, 2000
Jeff Corwin attends an annual festival dedicated to the deadly cobra.
3	"Arizona: Land of the Serpent"	December 17, 2000
Jeff discovers that the Arizona desert is crawling with creatures evolved to thrive in these harsh conditions.
4	"Alaska: Northern Exposure"	January 21, 2001
Jeff explores Alaska, a largely unexplored and undeveloped terrain
5	"Louisiana: Call of the Cajun Wild"	February 4, 2001
Jeff travels to the bayous of southern Louisiana.
6	"Thailand: The Royalty of Siam"	February 25, 2001
Jeff Corwin examines the different classes of elephants.
7	"Indonesia: Six Days to the Dragon"	March 18, 2001
Jeff searches for the Komodo dragon, the world's largest lizard.
8	"South America: Into the Heart of Darkness"	March 26, 2001
Jeff explores a largely unexplored rain forest.
9	"Brazil: The River Wolf and the Isle of Serpents"	May 13, 2001
Jeff enters the largest system of wetlands in the world.
10	"Namibia: Into Africa"	May 20, 2001
Jeff searches for the world's tallest sand dunes in the oldest desert.
11	"Madagascar: The Land That Time Forgot"	June 24, 2001
Jeff enters an island whose organisms have evolved in isolation.
12	"Panama: Bridge Between the Americas"	August 19, 2001
Jeff Corwin explores the isthmus.
13	"Galapagos: The Living Laboratory"	August 26, 2001
Jeff follows the evolutionary footsteps of Charles Darwin in the archipelago.
14	"Extreme Encounters"	August 26, 2001
A clip show episode.
15	"Snake-tacular"	September 2, 2001
Jeff Corwin searches the world for the ultimate snake encounter.

=== Season 2 (2002) ===
No.	Title	Original release date
16	"Florida: Exploring Pascua de Florida"	February 27, 2002
Jeff's journey takes him to Florida.
17	"Guyana: Land of the Giants"	March 24, 2002
Jeff Corwin explores the dense rain forest that thousands of "giants" call home.
18	"California: The Wild One"	March 24, 2002
Jeff travels to Californian coast.
19	"Costa Rica: The Arribiatta"	May 26, 2002
Jeff Corwin explores a secluded beach.
20	"Amazon: Goin' Bananas"	July 7, 2002
Jeff goes to the most impressive river system in the world, the Amazon.
21	"Australia: Out of Balance Down Under"	July 14, 2002
Jeff Corwin visits Australia's unique creatures.
22	"Tasmania: Sympathy for the Devil"	July 21, 2002
Jeff experiences the bizarre wildlife paradise of Tasmania.
23	"Zanzibar: Dr. Corwin I Presume"	July 28, 2002
Jeff follows in the footsteps of explorer Stanley Livingstone.
24	"Tanzania: Bodies in Motion"	July 28, 2002
Jeff sees a massive wildebeest migration and the predators that follow.
25	"India: Between the Tiger and the Lion"	August 4, 2002
Jeff seeks to find India's big cats.
26	"Nepal: Journey to Shangri-La"	August 11, 2002
Jeff encounters some of the most rare and majestic animals in the world.
27	"Morocco: A Time Machine of Sand"	August 18, 2002
Jeff uncovers the secretive desert animals.
28	"Spain: Americano Loco"	August 25, 2002
Jeff discovers all the fascinating creatures in Spain.
29	"Caught in the Act"	December 2, 2002
A compilation of bloopers and uncooperative animals.

=== Season 3 (2003) ===
No.	Title	Original release date
30	"Botswana: Exploring the Elephant Highway"	February 26, 2003
Jeff tracks the migration routes of African bush elephants.
31	"Uganda: It's a Croc Story"	March 5, 2003
Jeff searches for a 20 foot crocodile.
32	"Mexico: The Great Snake Hunt"	March 12, 2003
Jeff searches for some venomous snakes.
33	"Peru: Bear Necessities"	March 19, 2003
Jeff helps save South America's largest carnivore.
34	"Kenya: Hyena, Queen of the Beasts"	March 26, 2003
Jeff dispels some of the myths concerning misunderstood predators.
35	"Australia: Going Bats Down Under"	October 15, 2003
Jeff learns about flying foxes.
36	"Cambodia: Snakes on the Menu"	October 22, 2003
Jeff exposes perpetrators of the illegal wildlife trade.
37	"Indonesia: The Orangutan Freedom Journey"	October 29, 2003
The orangutan population dwindles due to poaching.
38	"The Big Bad Wolf?"	November 5, 2003
Jeff traverses the western United States to understand the North American gray wolf.
39	"Brazil: Saving the Tamarin"	November 12, 2003
Jeff relocates some tamarins.
40	"Venezuela: Operation Anaconda"	November 19, 2003
Jeff is hot on the trail of female anacondas.
41	"Where's Jeff?"	November 26, 2003
Corwin is blindfolded, and must determine what state he is in based on the snakes he finds.
42	"The Urban Show"	December 3, 2003
Jeff encounters amazing creatures in America's urban jungles.
