= Ndzalama Reserve =

Limpopo province, South Africa

Ndzalama Wildlife Reserve is a 14 000 ha private wildlife reserve in the Limpopo province of South Africa. Situated in the Valley of the Olifants. Located ± 55 km outside Tzaneen and ± 80 km outside Phalaborwa; Kruger National Park. Home to three of the "big five": elephant, lion, and leopard, and many other antelope, hippopotamuses, primates and birds. A season of the TV show Naked & Afraid was filmed at the reserve.
