= Blue Creek (Belize) =

River and archaeological site in Belize

- Rio Azul
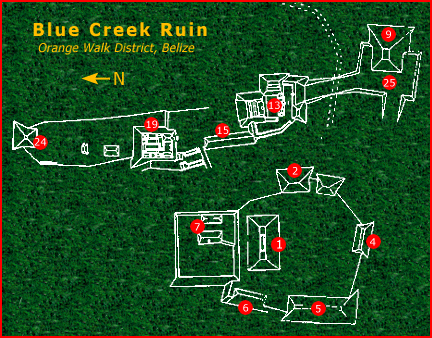
- The ruins excavated at the Maya site 'Blue Creek'

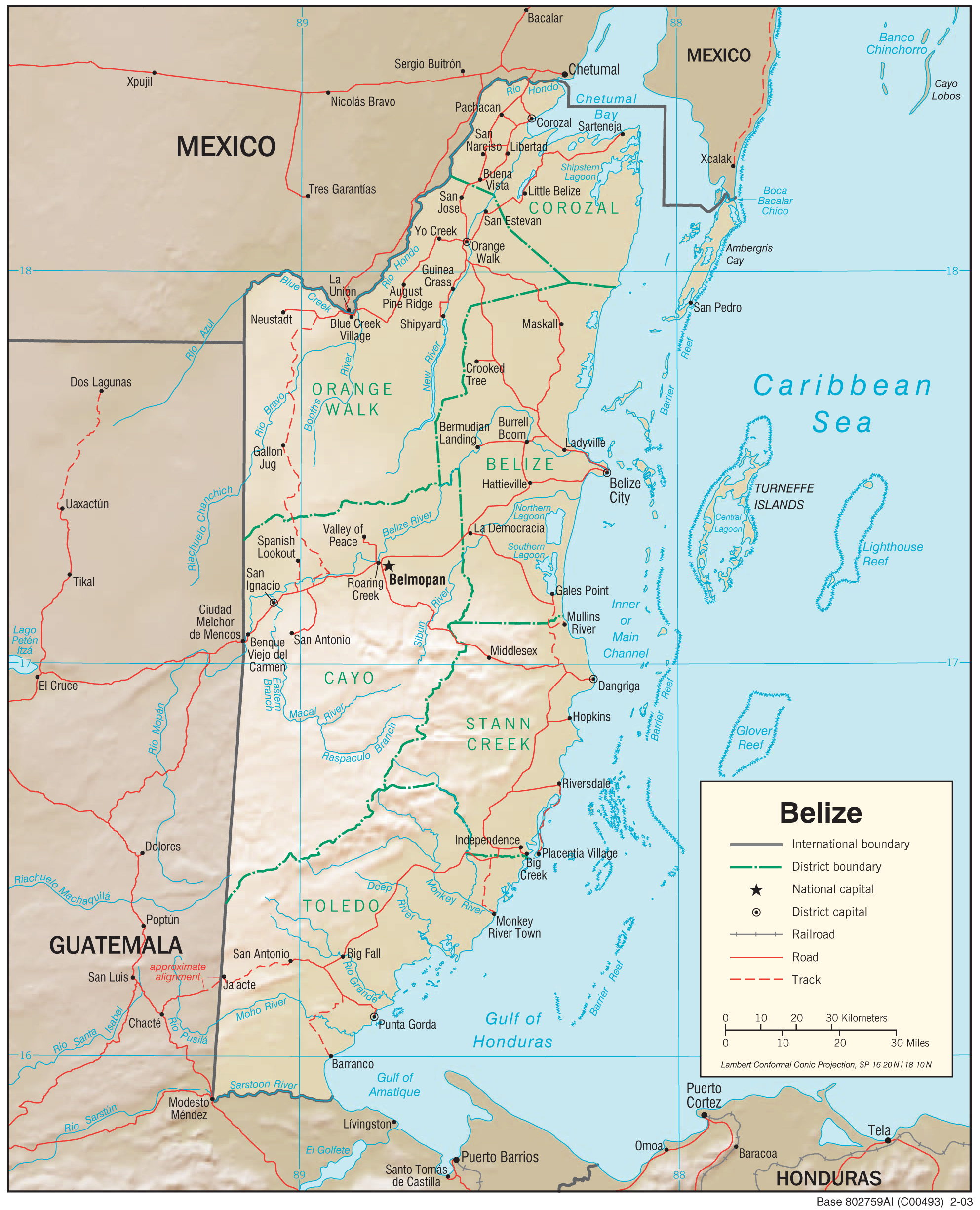
- 17°54′N 88°54′W
- Location: Northwestern Belize, Central America
- Part of: Orange Walk District

Site notes
- Architectural style: Early pre-classic to late classic period

Blue Creek is a riverine system and major archaeological site located in North-Western Belize, Central America. It is situated geographically on the Belize–Mexico border and then continues south across the Guatemala–Mexico border. The river is commonly known as the Río Azul (in Spanish) or Azul River.

It flows south-west as a tributary from its larger body known as the Río Hondo or Hondo River. Its unique lowland environment facilitated the agricultural and economic growth of an Ancient Maya Civilization and has been a source of attention over many years, for numerous specialized archaeologists. The site boundary stops short of the Bravo Escarpment, which is a naturally occurring cliff also located in North Western Belize.

A range of artifacts recovered from the site reveal that Blue Creek was inhabited by many ancient Maya communities from the middle pre-classic period to the late-classic period in Mesoamerican chronology.

== Archaeological history ==
Archaeologists first investigated Blue Creek in the 20th century via a government-driven study, and it is believed that no official research was conducted before 1973. Since then, it has been investigated by various teams of scientists and agricultural experts who have analyzed the ruins of several Maya civilizations that existed over the pre-classic to late-classic period.

Data shows that the site became uninhibited at some point during the 800’s A.D. The site was then temporarily and partly occupied 200 years later at the conclusion of the classic period. While there are many theories surrounding the fall of the Maya empire, evidence suggests there was a significant decrease in population at this time and a gradual destruction of infrastructure. A 2016 case study on the role of kings at Blue Creek, suggests their responses to significant environmental issues such as drought or soil degradation and their handling of resources, may have been a factor in the society’s collapse. Others suggest that soil depletion, more generally, may have been the reason for the society’s collapse.

21st-century research continues with non-government organizations employing several volunteers and experts to work within the site to document, protect, and preserve this area.

== Geography ==
The Blue Creek site is located just north of the Bravo Escarpment in north-western Belize. It is one of many identified archaeological locations in the immediate surrounding area. The site is situated in the three rivers region, where the Rio Azul, Booth’s river, and the Rio Bravo converge, forming the Rio Hondo. The site's northern border is located in a canyon, with waters more than 100m deep, where the Rio Hondo declines into the escarpment.

Blue Creek connects the Caribbean Sea to Belize's coastal communities via the Rio Hondo and is divided into two sections being the eastern Petén and the Belize Coastal Plain. The Petén plateau is a limestone-rich area consisting of uplands that drain into ‘Bajos,’ a term used to describe depressions in wetland ecosystems. The Rio Bravo depression demonstrates the site’s environmental diversity, as it contains both wetlands and scattered drylands.

== Agriculture ==
As Blue Creek exists in an area with multiple environmental ecotones, it has significant variation in types of land and soil, which historically provided the Maya people with constancy in their food production throughout the year. In particular, the fertile soil above the Bravo escarpment where Blue Creek is located, has been commended by modern farmers who have consistently harvested successful dry-farming crops. Pollen samples from Laguna Verde, at the Blue Creek site, and their position in the pollen spectrum, have allowed historians to reconstruct past vegetation the environmental conditions of Blue Creek periodically (Morse, 2009).

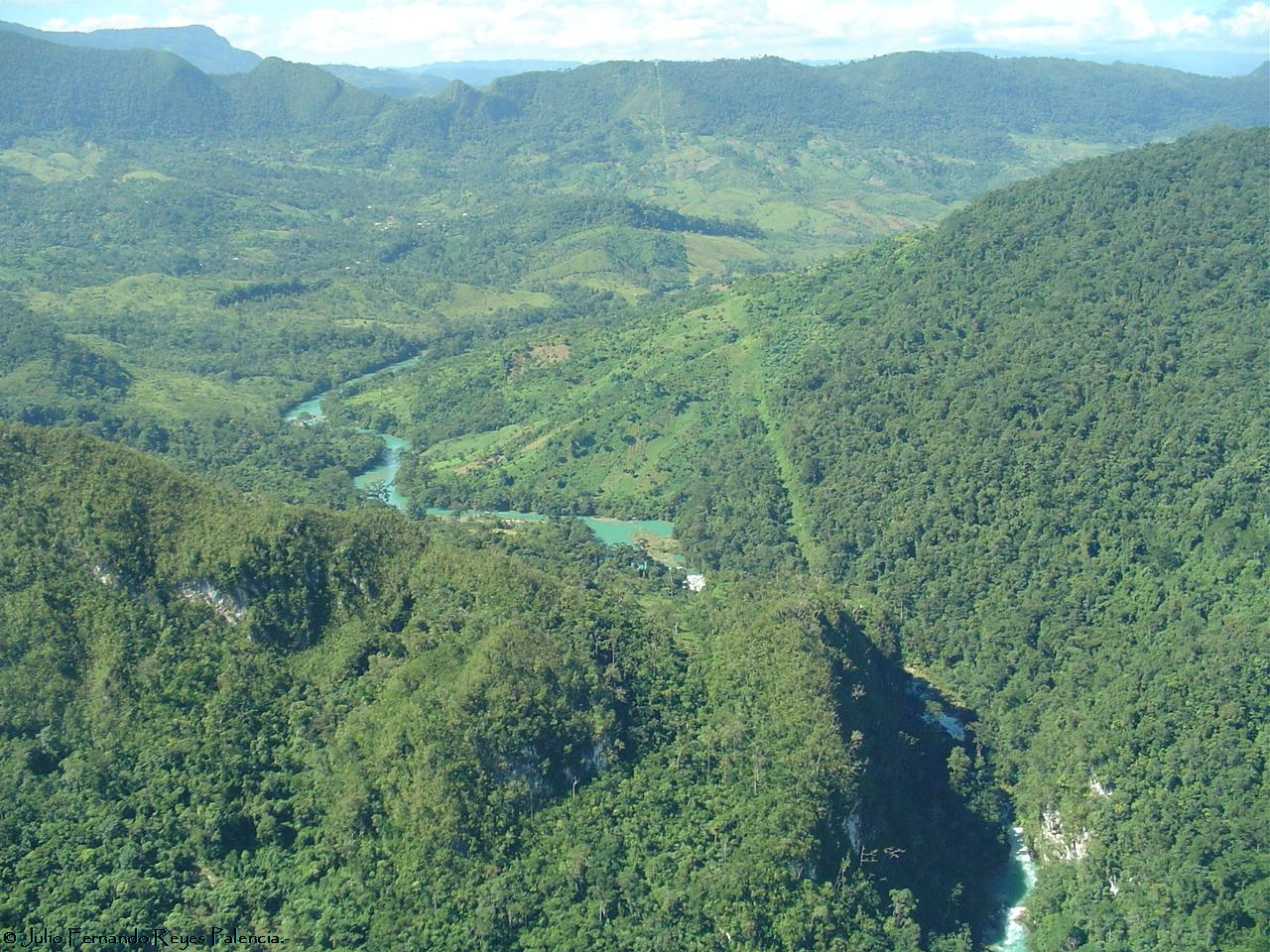
Frontera Guatemala Mexico

The Mayan ‘terracing' technique has provided the foundations for contemporary sustainable farming. The primary purpose of the terracing technique is to limit the erosion of soil to provide a solid foundation for planting, as well as maximizing soil moisture, but also utilized the available land in areas with steep slopes that would ordinarily be unsuitable for planting. This technique began in the early classic period at Blue Creek as a response to the occurrence of increased soil erosion evident in the pre-classic period, and utilized check dams and naturally occurring canals. It later developed in the late classic period into dry slope terracing, which may have facilitated Blue Creek’s urban growth. Many of these ancient terraces are still functioning today.

Furthermore, archaeological remains uncovered in the upland terrain of Blue Creek, show that the Ancient Maya people used solar observation, water management, and the manipulation of soil fertility to their gain. Knowledge about the Sun and its place in the Solar System was a vital factor in food production for the Maya people. Ethnographic accounts of Maya culture show that Mesoamerican communities deeply ingrained rituals in their agricultural practices. Sacrifices and offerings were made in a ceremony to guarantee rainfall and successful crops. The Quincunx group in the hinterland, just 2.5 km behind Blue Creek, is an architectural design consisting of five structures placed in a strategic square, with one construction in the middle. This design facilitated a widely used agricultural ritual used by people to determine cosmological patterns and solstices during the late classic period. Access to the river was a vital asset to engaging in successful agricultural practices.

== Architecture and social structure ==
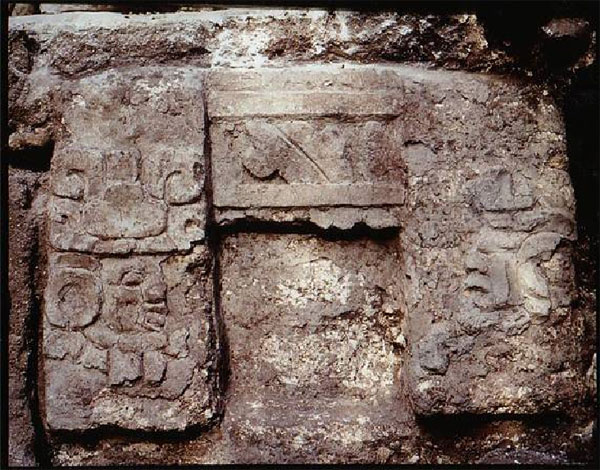
Ahua Masks

Most of Blue Creek’s architectural structures followed the edge of the Bravo escarpment, with similar structures to that of nearby regions. Blue Creek’s core area of 20 square kilometers is believed to have been the social hub of the district where historians uncovered the remains of two plaza complexes, a ball court constructed in the early classic period, and two courtyards whose purposes are still debated. The organization of the Blue Creek site was highly intentional and deliberately calculated by the Maya people, to build structures that reflect sacred and cultural significance. The practical design of the area facilitated social communication and provided areas for agricultural, religious, and administrative activities that were engrained heavily in ritualistic ideology. Four periods of architectural transformation have been identified within the terminal pre-classic era, the early classic era, and the late classic era.

At some point during 500 A.D., Blue Creek is believed to have been taken over by a larger neighboring political force. This is evident through the lack of construction and the presence of jade after this period. The other major component of the Blue Creek site is known as the Western Group by historians. Elite residences generally were differentiated by historians from examining their architectural scale and their location with regards to the center of the district as well as essential resources.

The site divides into two subdivisions that operate in separate functional roles, titled by historians as Plaza A and Plaza B. Archaeologists have found more than 400 residential structures at Blue Creek, indicating the separation evident between the elite and common classes. This social divide was revealed through the excavation of structure 9, now commonly known as “The Temple of the Masks”, displaying that the belief in divine kingship was a significant part of the social structure at Blue Creek. The preserved masks were found on the outside of the temple’s façade, and have been dated back to the early classic period, despite being thought initially to have come from the late classic period. Pictured to the right is an image of the relief located outside of ‘The Temple of Masks’. This area is believed to be an elite residence where the ‘ajaw’ mask signifies that it was a house for Maya rulers. The term ‘ajaw’ refers to the image of the half abstracted face, which is symbolic of the lord. The bibs underneath each mask indicate its origins from the early classic period. This structure suggests that Blue Creek was an independent community with its own hierarchy and ruling system. Further evidence of religious practices is apparent through a structure located at the back of Plaza B, titled the ‘Temple of the Obsidian Warrior’. This temple was looted like many other structures at Blue Creek, which have provided significant obstacles in the research of archaeologists.

Another excavation revealed an early classic colonnaded building at Blue Creek, which was an unusual architectural form as compared to typical Maya structures, which were composed of thick masonry. Plaza A at the Blue Creek site encompasses six of these traditional masonry structures. The building was thought to be a viewing platform for public activities, as it was elevated and consisted of 8 columns rather than solid walls at both the rear and front end of the structure.

The discovery of a cache (Hoard) vessel inside a small temple as a part of the 1998 field season at Blue Creek, reveals much about the importance of cosmology in Maya religion and creation theory. The Tonina shrine, located inside structure 3, consists of mountain and hearthstone depictions, which are thought to be direct references to concepts surrounding creation as a valued cultural belief. The relationship between the Temple itself and the mountain pictured is believed to be symbolic of Sacred Maya landscapes. The limestone boulder found in structure 3, suggests that this was also a valuable resource kept at Blue Creek.

== Economy and trade ==
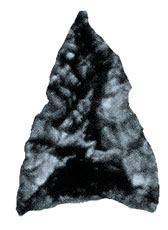
Obsidian Arrowhead

Generally, it is now thought that Mayan communities specialized in specific resources and functioned independently and freely, which contrasts the classic ideology where larger hegemonic Maya centers governed production schedules. Blue Creek itself had access to a high amount of exotic goods and was a wealthy community. Many archeologists attribute the success and wealth of Blue Creek, even as a medium-sized center to their strategic location on the Hondo River, and thus to Caribbean coastal communities and economic centers.

Evidence of the riverine trade system between pre-Columbian communities consists of a dock and dam complex found on the Hondo River just above the Blue Creek site. Furthermore, deposits from Blue Creek date back to the pre-classic and classic periods. Cobblestones were used as raw building materials to construct docks and dams to facilitate trade and communication. The contents of these deposits confirm the trading practices that took place between Blue Creek and as far south as Motagua River groups, located in Guatemala. These resources were an essential part of the Maya community as they profoundly influenced the hierarchy present in both socio and economic categories. Archaeological evidence of stone tools from Colha displays that industrial manufacturing was also occurring during the pre-Columbian period and sent to Blue Creek through a communications and commerce network.

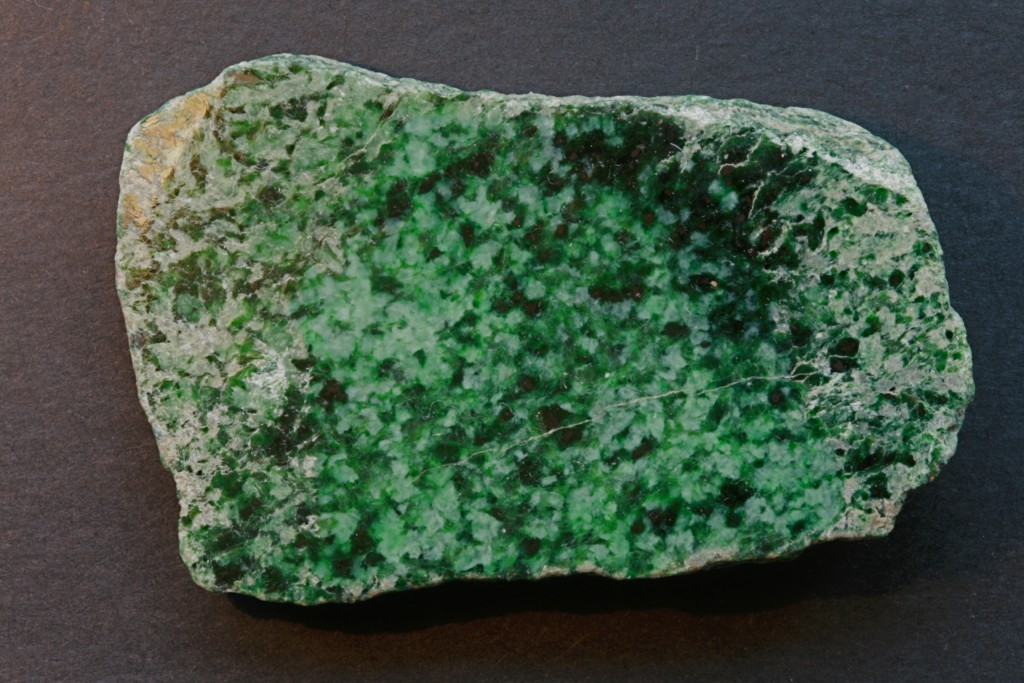
Jadeite

=== Resources ===
The quality of the soil at Blue Creek as an agricultural base, was a major resource for the site. Conflict in the late classic era is thought by many to be the result of Blue Creek’s increasing population and decreasing agricultural productivity and thus competition for soil as a resource, positioning it in a degree of high importance. Evidence also suggests that resources such as jadeite and nephrite were precious resources at Blue Creek and a significant source of wealth. More than 1,500 jade objects, as well as obsidian blades, metamorphic grinding stones, and sponges from the Caribbean coast, were found at the Blue Creek site. The majority of this jade was located in areas of ritual importance such as structure four, tomb five, and tomb seven. In total, 458 pieces of obsidian were found in structure four, making up 425 blades and 27 cores which were all traced back to El Chayal source. El Chayal is an ancient site located just outside of the modern Guatemala City that had high levels of obsidian deposits, and pre-Columbian communities such as the Maya people, used it as a resource industry. The residue of nine dedicatory cache (Hoard) vessels indicates that sponge and plant remains from the Caribbean coast were valued resources at Blue Creek, in religious and ritual practices. These caches were dedicated to the Gods. Commonly, they consisted of two ceramic bowls, with the second inverted on top of the first to create a spherical structure, with precious materials such as jade, obsidian, shells, and coral placed inside.

== See also ==
- Rio Azul
- Blue Creek, Orange Walk
- List of rivers of Belize
