= Blue Creek Rainforest Preserve =

Nature preserve in Belize

Coordinates: 16.19494°N 89.04321°W

Blue Creek Rainforest Preserve is a small, private rainforest nature preserve in southern Belize, near the Guatemalan border. It is home to iguana, termite, Bothrops asper, and other snake species, Bufo marinus, lizards, tarantula, leafcutter ants, several species of bats, Morelet's crocodile, jaguarundi, jaguar, tapir, and others. Its habitat consist of lush rainforest, waterfalls, lakes, ponds, lagoons, rivers, and streams. It is named after the Blue Creek Village, which is located in the area.
