= Conrad Creek =

Stream in the U.S. state of Missouri

Conrad Creek is a stream in northern Bollinger County in the U.S. state of Missouri. It is a tributary of Whitewater River. The stream headwaters are in the northwest corner of the county at 37°35′01″N 90°07′47″W and it flows east to its confluence with the Whitewater at 37°35′43″N 90°02′02″W, just south of the community of Yount in adjacent Perry County.

Conrad Creek has the name of George E. Conrad, a pioneer settler.

== See also ==
- List of rivers of Missouri
