= Hondo River (Belize) =

River of Central America

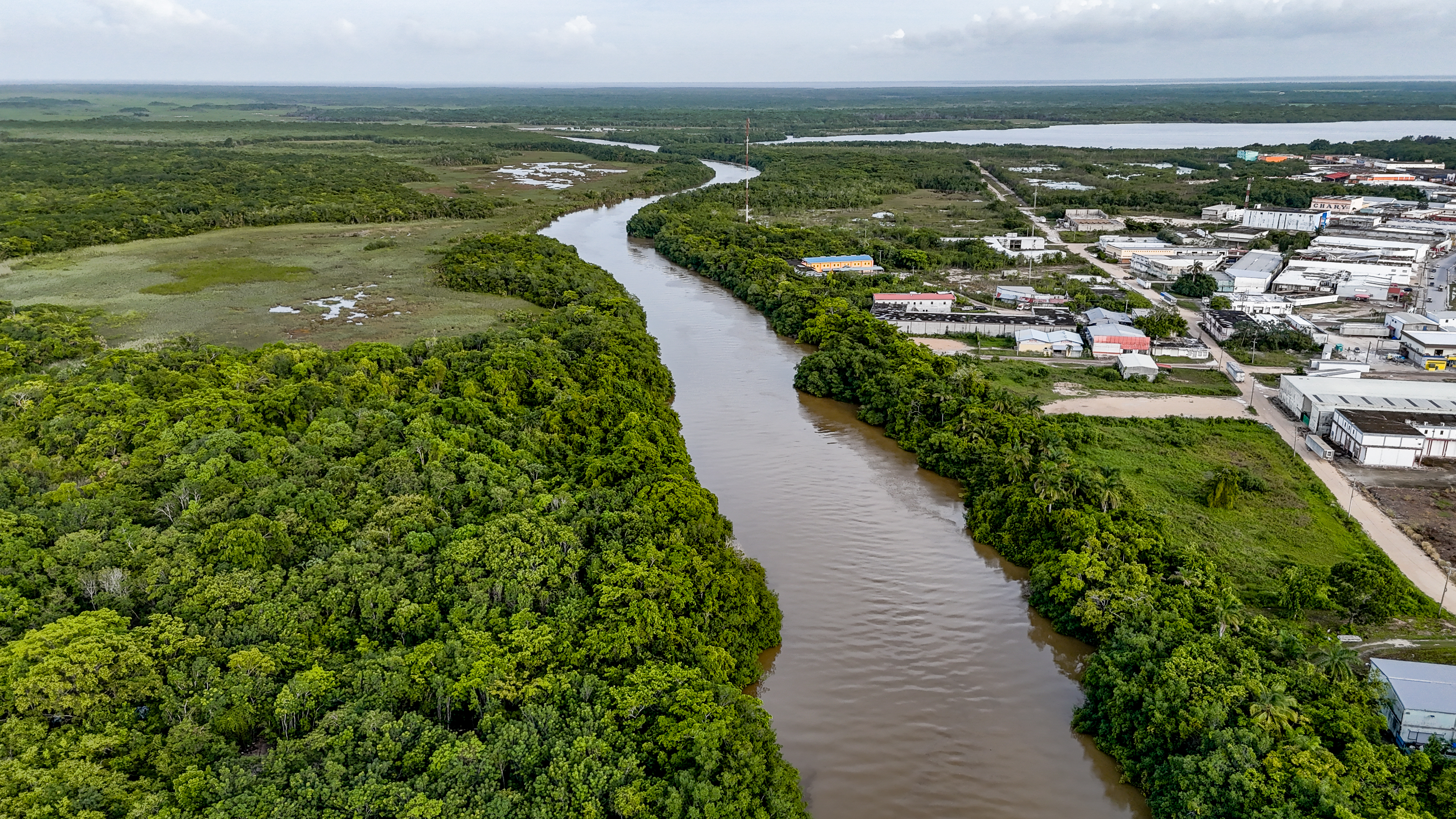
- The Rio Hondo, border between Mexico and Belize

Location
- Countries: Belize and Mexico

Physical characteristics
- Source
  - location: Belize
- Mouth
  - location: Chetumal Bay
  - coordinates: 18.48791°N 88.31841°W
  - elevation: 0 m (0 ft)
- Length: 145 km (90 mi)

The Hondo River or Río Hondo ([ˈri.o ˈondo]) is a river of Central America, 145 kilometres (90 mi) long, which flows in a northeasterly direction into Chetumal Bay on the Caribbean Sea. Most of the border between Mexico and Belize is defined by the Hondo or its tributary, Blue Creek, the latter also known as the Río Azul.

== Geography ==
The Hondo River originates in the Petén Department of Guatemala, enters Mexico and forms most of the border with Belize to the south before entering Chetumal Bay. It is the bay's primary inflow, supplying 1.5×10^{9} cubic metres (5.3×10^{10} cu ft) of freshwater. It has an average width of 50 metres (160 ft) and an average depth of 10 metres (33 ft). The river generally follows the Bravo Escarpment to its north, meandering in a southwestly to northeastly direction. The floodplain usually ranges from 1 to 3 kilometres (0.62 to 1.86 mi) wide. The watershed occupies 15,075.5 square kilometres (5,820.7 sq mi). The Hondo has a number of tributaries, including Blue Creek.

The surrounding vegetation consists of "medium subdeciduous forest, low evergreen forest, low flood forest, savanna, cultivated grasslands, sugar cane cultivation, and riverbank mangrove".

== Climate ==
The temperature ranges from 21 to 31 °C (70 to 88 °F), averaging 26 °C (79 °F). The annual precipitation of 1,178 millimetres (46.4 in), with a rainy season between June and September.

== History ==
Archaeologists Thomas Guderjan and Samantha Krause determined that "the Rio Hondo was a major transportation route for goods to and from the Caribbean sea" for the pre-Columbian Maya civilization. A "dock and dam complex" has been discovered on the Hondo near Blue Creek. What are likely traces of Maya farming systems were found in the upper reaches of the Hondo. Maya rectangular raised fields "occur with great abundance along the Hondo River flood plain." Three major Maya sites, Aventura, Nomul and El Posito, lie on the high ridge between the Hondo and New River rivers.

Following the Spanish defeat in September 1798 in the Battle of St. George's Caye off the coast of what is now Belize, the Spanish and British agreed in a series of treaties to establish the Hondo as the boundary between their lands. Raids and attacks against British mahogany cutters were reported crossing over the Hondo River in 1846 and March 1847, supposedly by Native Americans, but possibly by Mayans. A treaty was signed in 1893 between Britain and Mexico which set the border between the latter and what was then British Honduras; one of the treaty's provisions stipulated Britain's help in suppressing Native American raids in the river's vicinity.

== Anthem ==
The river is mentioned in a stanza of Belize's national anthem, "Land of the Free":

...
Our fathers, the Baymen, valiant and bold
Drove back the invader; this heritage hold
From proud Rio Hondo to old Sarstoon,
Through coral isle, over blue lagoon;
...
