= Flag of Tlaxcala =

- Proportion: 2:3
- Adopted: 30 December 2016, as original version; 19 December 2018, as current version

The flag of Tlaxcala was adopted in 2016. It is colored red and white and bears the State Emblem in the center. The emblem consists of a rectangle ratio of width-length 3:2, divided by a diagonal line from the bottom right (hoist-side) to the downer left. Ribbons of the same colors may be placed at the foot of the finial. This flag was designed by Desiderio Hernández Xochitiotzin in 1996.

On December 30, 2016, the State Congress carries out the protocol act of legal recognition of the flag of the State of Tlaxcala inside the Honorable State Congress. After the signature of the current delegate who handed over the banner and it was placed in its official niche. Currently the flag has government and civil use.

== Design and symbolism ==
The meaning of the colors of the state flag are as follows honor of the reign of Charles V:

- Silver (white).
- Gules (red).

=== Other flags ===
Flag of Crown of Castile.

== History ==
In 1981, at the initiative of Governor Tulio Hernández, the artist Desiderio Hernández, they connect the two levels of the Government Palace building. The colors of the Tlaxcala flag were taken up by the design of the flag of Castile and León, which are gules and silver, in honor of the reign of Charles V, who gave the royal certificate of the coat of arms to Tlaxcala using the same colors, red and white. Years later, the Tlaxcala flag began to be used on canvas without having an official use at the time.

=== Historical flags ===
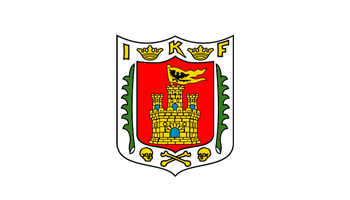
Flag of Tlaxcala (1972–1998)

Flag of Tlaxcala (1998–2015)

== See also ==
- State flags of Mexico
- Flag of Jalisco
- Flag of Yucatán
