= Captaincy General of Yucatán =

1527–1821 administrative division of New Spain

Province of Yucatán Provincia de Yucatán (Spanish)
- Province of New Spain
- 1527–1821
- Coat of arms

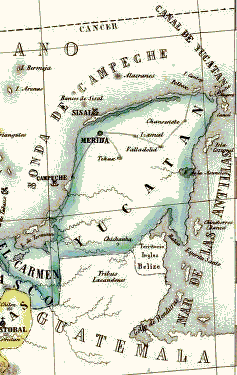
- Captaincy General of Yucatán

Anthem
- Marcha Real (Spanish) "Royal March"
- Capital: Mérida; 20°58′N 89°37′W
- Government
  - Type: Absolute monarchy with theocratic and oligarchic features
  - Motto: Plus ultra (Latin) ‘Further Beyond’
- Viceroy
  - 1535–1550: Antonio de Mendoza / first
  - 1821: Juan O'Donojú / last
- Governor
  - 1527–1540: Francisco de Montejo / first
  - 1821: Juan María Echeverri / last
- Legislature: Audiencia of Mexico
- Historical era: Spanish conquest to Latin American independence
  - Start of Spanish conquest: September 1527
  - Declaration of independence: September 15, 1821
- Subdivisions
  - Type: Municipality
  - Units: Bacalar; Campeche; Mérida; Valladolid
Preceded by	Succeeded by
Maya civilization	British Honduras; First Mexican Empire
- Today part of: Belize; Guatemala; Mexico

The Province of Yucatán (/ˌjuːkəˈtɑːn, -ˈtæn/ YOO-kə-TA(H)N, UK also /ˌjʊk-/ YUU-; Spanish: Provincia de Yucatán [pɾoˈβinsja ðe ʝukaˈtan]), or the Captaincy General, Governorate, Intendancy, or Kingdom of Yucatán, was a first order administrative subdivision of the Viceroyalty of New Spain in the Yucatán Peninsula. (Note: Article-wide notices.: 1. The Yucatec Mayan orthography in this article follows that of Barrera Vásquez et al. 1980, pp. 41a–44a. At least two other orthographic systems exist, per Lehmann 2018, sec. 2.1, 3, neither of which is used in this article.; 2. Various dates for periods of the Mesoamerican chronology have been given in scholarly literature (further see Periodisation of the history of Belize). This article uses those provided by Sharer & Traxler 2006, p. 98, namely, Lithic – 8000 BC and prior dates, Archaic – 8000 to 2000 BC, Preclassic – 2000 BC to 250 AD, Classic – 250 to 900 AD, and Postclassic – 900 AD and posterior dates. Furthermore, dates prior to 12 October 1492 constitute the pre-Columbian era, and all others the Columbian era.)

== Geography ==
=== Physical ===
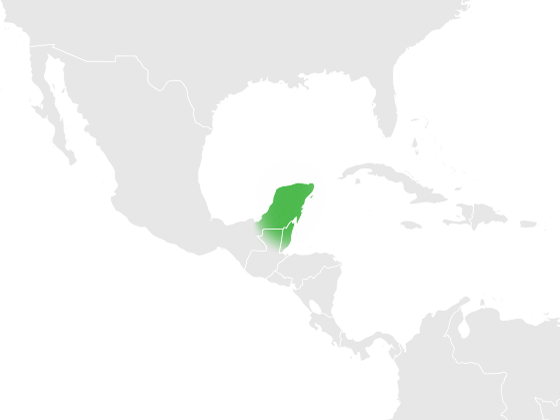
Location and extent of the Yucatán Peninsula (in green).

The Yucatán Peninsula is a low-lying, tropical, karstic platform of circa 300,000 square kilometres (120,000 mi^{2}), bound by the Bay of Campeche in the Gulf of Mexico to the northwest, and the Bay of Honduras in the Caribbean Sea to the southeast.

=== Human ===
At the dawn of the sixteenth century, the Peninsula encompassed various kuchkabalo'ob or Postclassic Mayan states. (Note: The number and nature of the Postclassic Mayan states is still debated (Andrews 1984, pp. 589–590, Graham 2011, pp. 29).) At least some of these are believed to have previously been administrative districts of Chichen Itza and Mayapan. (Note: Chichen Itza was established by Itza settlers in circa 750–800 AD. It was the most powerful city-state in the Yucatán peninsula until circa 1050–1100 AD (Sharer & Traxler 2006, pp. 559, 568, 591–592, Demarest, Rice & Rice 2004, pp. 520–521, 561–562, Aimers 2007, p. 339). It is believed to have sustained a successful programme of conquest during the tenth century, thereby bringing neighbouring inland settlements and key coastal ports under its dominion (Sharer & Traxler 2006, pp. 567–570, 579, Roys 1957, p. 3, Demarest, Rice & Rice 2004, pp. 531–533, 537–542). It is commonly credited with (coercively) sponsoring the cult of K'uk'ulkan or Kukulkan, and the Postclassic peninsular coasting trade (Aimers 2007, pp. 339–340, Sharer & Traxler 2006, pp. 582–583, Demarest, Rice & Rice 2004, p. 377). The city-state of Mayapan succeeded Chichen Itza during k'atun 8 ahaw (either 1080–1104 AD or 1185–1204 AD), and ruled the peninsula for thirteen k'atuno'ob (either to 1392–1416 AD or 1441–1461 AD) (Sharer & Traxler 2006, pp. 595–598, 603, Demarest, Rice & Rice 2004, p. 375).)

== History ==
New Spain in mid 17th century / 1656 map by N Sanson / via LOC

=== Sixteenth century ===
==== Before conquest ====
Peninsular residents are thought to have first learnt of the Spanish in late 1502, upon Christopher Columbus's landing at Guanaja in late July or early August 1502. (Note: Guanaja was a port of call in the Postclassic peninsular coasting trade (Graham 2011, p. 22).) Spaniards are thought to have first reached the Yucatán Peninsula in the latter half of 1508, during the Pinzón–Solís voyage. (Note: The Magdalena, master Gonzalo Ruíz, and the Isabelita or the San Benito, master Pedro de Ledesma, sailed from Sanlúcar de Barrameda on 29 June 1508 (Reichert 2017, p. 14, Torre Revello 1956, pp. 235–237). The latter captain was the expedition's chief pilot, and had previously accompanied Columbus during his third and fourth voyages in 1498–1500 and 1502–1504 (Arranz Márquez 2018b, para. 5, 7, 12, Torre Revello 1956, p. 237). This voyage is known to have reached Guanaja in the Bay of Honduras, but there is disagreement as to whether the expedition then headed north to Cape Catoche or east to Cape Gracias a Dios (Graham 2011, pp. 122–123, Torre Revello 1956, pp. 234–235, 237–239, Saville 1918, pp. 436–437).) The first Spanish residents of Yucatán were Gonzalo Guerrero, Jerónimo de Aguilar, and their stranded colleagues, who in 1511 had been swept towards the Peninsula from their shipwreck at the Pedro Bank, southwest of Jamaica, and thereafter impressed or enslaved by a batab or mayor of the Ekab Province.

Hispano-Mayan hostilities broke out on 5 March 1517, when the Hernández de Córdoba expedition were ambushed by the military or militia of the Ekab Province near that state's eponymous capital. (Note: The expedition of three ships and over 100 men had been commissioned by Diego Velázquez de Cuéllar, first Spanish governor of Cuba. It seems to have been destined to the Bahamas or the Bay Islands, in search of slaves, but instead set course towards the Peninsula on the prompting of chief pilot Antón de Alamilla, who had sailed with Columbus on his fourth voyage of 1502–1504 (Chamberlain 1948, p. 11). Despite the 1502 Columbus landing at Guanaja, 1508 Díaz de Solís–Yáñez Pinzón reconnaissance, and 1511 stranding of Guerrero, de Aguilar, and company, this 1517 Hernández de Córdoba expedition is popularly deemed the discovery of the Peninsula (Ojeda 2019, pp. 176–177, 180, 183, Saville 1918, pp. 437–438).) The expeditionaries' reports of grand Mayan cities lead to further Cuban expeditions to the Gulf coast of the Peninsula, notably leading up to the 1519–1521 conquest of the Aztec Empire.

==== Spanish conquest ====
On 8 December 1526, Charles I of Spain granted Francisco de Montejo a capitulación de conquista or letters patent for the conquest of the Mayan states in the Peninsula. (Note: The same had first been granted to Diego Velázquez de Cuéllar on 13 November 1518 (Arranz Márquez 2018a, para. 38). Both capitulaciones granted their recipients the titles and offices of adelantado, governor, and captain general of Yucatán (Arranz Márquez 2018a, para. 38, García Bernal 2018, para. 13). A digitised copy of the Velázquez de Cuéllar capitulacion is available from the Portal de Archivos Españoles under call number INDIFERENTE,415,L.1,F.16V-18V. A copy of the de Montejo one is similarly available under call number INDIFERENTE,415,L.1,F.90V-98V.) The Salamancan conquistador was thereby granted the titles and offices of adelantado, governor, captain general, and alguacil mayor of Yucatán. Montejo, with four ships and over 250 men, embarked from Seville in late June 1527, reaching Cozumel, in the Ekab Province, in late September 1527. (Note: The ships were– (i) the San Jerónimo, Miguel Ferrer master, (ii) Nicolasa, Ochoa master, (iii) La Gavarra, master not named, and (iv) a fourth unnamed ship, master likewise not named. Montejo's principal subordinates were Alonso Dávila (second-in-command), Antón Sánchez Calabrés, Pedro de los Ríos, Pedro de Añasco, Pedro de Lugones, Pedro González, Hernando Palomino, Pedro Gaitán, and possibly Andrés de Calleja and Roberto Alemán. Crown representatives Pedro de Luna and Hernando de Cueto accompanied the expedition, as did frays Juan Rodríguez de Caraveo, Pedro Fernández, and Gregorio de San Martín. The flotilla was thoroughly refitted at Santo Domingo (Chamberlain 1948, pp. 31–35).) The Spanish conquest began in 1527, upon the founding of Salamanca de Xelha, in the Ekab Province, and protracted itself to 1544, ending with the founding of Salamanca de Bacalar in the Waymil Province. (Note: There had been Hispano–Mayan engagements prior to the conquest, eg during the 1517 Hernández de Córdoba expedition (Chamberlain 1948, pp. 11–12). Additionally, the conquest did not bring all peninsular Mayan polities under Spanish rule, eg the Peten Itza kingdom was not defeated until 13 March 1697 (Jones 1998, pp. 296–300). By 31 December 1544, the (Spanish) Province of Yucatán consisted of four municipalities–: 1. San Francisco de Campeche or Campeche– est. 4 October 1540 (Chamberlain 1948, p. 201), 2. Mérida, the provincial capital– est. 6 January 1542 (Chamberlain 1948, pp. 211–214), 3. Valladolid– est. 28 May 1543 (Chamberlain 1948, pp. 225–226), 4. Salamanca de Bacalar– est. 1544 (Chamberlain 1948, p. 234).)

==== After conquest ====
In 1546, state and local officers, and priests, of the (recently defeated) pre-Columbian province of Kupul began organising a coalition force for a swift military strike on Mérida, Valladolid, and Bacalar. Six neighbouring (former) provinces joined Kupul in the operation, which was scheduled for the full moon night of 8–9 November 1546. (Note: Namely, Koch Wah, Sotuta, Tases, Waymil, Chetumal, and Chik'in Che'el (Chamberlain 1948, p. 240).) On said night, circa 500–600 non-allied Mayans, and fifteen to twenty encomenderos were massacred. (Note: Casualties included persons not deemed fit for combat, eg women and children. At least some victims were ritualistically tortured and killed. Additionally, Spanish-owned cattle and pets, and non-native plants, were destroyed (Chamberlain 1948, p. 241).) The planned offensive on Mérida faltered, while that on Valladolid devolved into a siege, broken circa two weeks afterwards by a military detachment from Mérida. The strike on Bacalar likewise devolved into a blockade, broken in early 1547. The defeated coalition forces nonetheless determined on guerrilla warfare. By March 1547, most coalition troops had been defeated, exhausted by attrition, or otherwise convinced to lay down their arms. Afterwards, five or six of the principal instigators were tried and killed, circa 2,000 prisoners of war were (illegally) enslaved, a number of Spanish military captains were charged with and convicted of war crimes. (Note: At least some instigators were burnt at the stake, including the Kupul chilam or priest, Anbal, who had been named the foremost principal instigator by Spaniards and defeated Mayans (Chamberlain 1948, pp. 249, 251–252). The New Laws of 20 November 1542 forbade the enslavement of natives (Chamberlain 1948, pp. 250–251). Francisco de Montejo, adelantado, governor and captain general of Spanish Yucatán, enforced this prohibition in the latter half of 1547, or in 1548 (Chamberlain 1948, p. 251). It is not clear what sentences the convicts received (Chamberlain 1948, pp. 250, 252).)

=== Seventeenth century ===
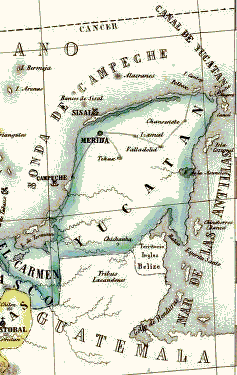
Intendancy of Yucatán

The Captaincy General of Yucatán was created in 1617 to provide more autonomy for the Peninsula, previously ruled directly by a simple governor under the jurisdiction of Audiencia of Mexico. Its creation was part of the, ultimately futile, Habsburg attempt in the late 16th century to prevent incursion into the Caribbean by foreign powers, which also involved the establishment of Captaincies General in Puerto Rico, Cuba, and neighboring Guatemala. With the addition of the title of captain general to the governor of Yucatán, the province gained greater autonomy in administration and military matters. Unlike in most areas of Spanish America, no formal corregidores were used in Yucatán, and instead the governor-captain general relied on other subordinate officials to handle the oversight of local districts. The Captaincy General remained part of the Viceroyalty of New Spain, with the viceroy retaining the right to oversee the province's governance, when it was deemed necessary, and the Audiencia of Mexico taking judicial cases in appeal. The province and captaincy general covered the territory that today are the States of Campeche, Quintana Roo, Tabasco, Yucatán, and nominally the northern areas of Petén and Belize.

Law IV ("Que el Governador de Yucatan guarde las ordenes del Virrey de Nueva España") of Title I ("De los Terminos, Division, y Agregación de las Governaciones") of Book V of the Recopilación de Leyes de Indias of 1680 reproduces the 2 November 1627 royal decree (real cédula) of Philip V, which established the nature of the relationship between the Governor of Yucatán and the Viceroy of New Spain: "It is convenient that the governors and captain generals of the Province of Yucatán, precisely and in a timely manner fulfill the orders that the viceroys of New Spain give them. And we order that the governors obey them and fulfill them."

=== Eighteenth century ===
In 1786, as part of the Bourbon Reforms the Spanish Crown established an Intendancy of Yucatán covering the same area as the Province. The intendancy took control of government and military finances and had broad powers to promote the local economy.

=== Nineteenth century ===
On 15 September 1821, in the Hall of Councils of the City of Mérida, Yucatán declared its independence from Spain. Almost immediately, Governor Juan María Echeverri sent two representatives to negotiate the incorporation of Yucatán into the Mexican Empire. The incorporation into the Mexican Empire took place on 2 November 1821.

== Society ==
=== Religion ===
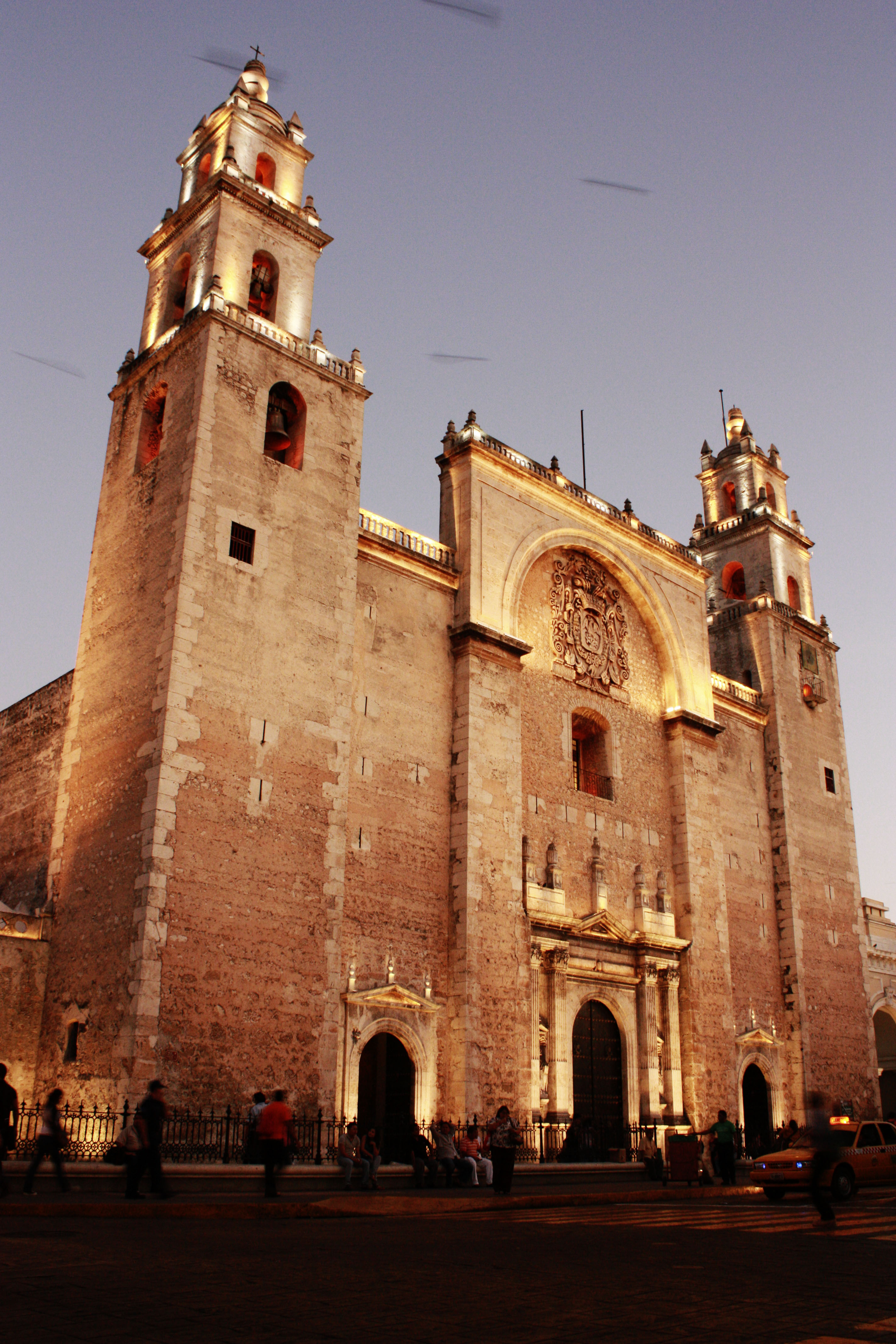
Cathedral of Merida in 2011 by Aubolio.

The letters patent of 8 December 1526, granted to Francisco de Montejo for the conquest of the Yucatán Peninsula, incorporated various provisions designed to ensure the successful conversion of Mayan residents to (Roman Catholic) Christianity. (Note: Among these were the–: 1. imposition of diezmos or tithes for the maintenance of the Roman Catholic Church (Chamberlain 1948, p. 21), 2. appointment of a bishop within five years (Chamberlain 1948, p. 21), 3. enslavement of Mayan residents who refused compliance with the Requerimiento (Chamberlain 1948, pp. 22–23), 4. prohibition from entry to Spanish Yucatán by non-Christians and Christian heretics, including Jews, Moors and Lutherans (Chamberlain 1948, p. 22), 5. appointment of at least two secular clergy to accompany reconnaissance, trade, conquest, and settlement expeditions (Chamberlain 1948, p. 23).) Christian proselytising efforts in the Peninsula were begun in late September 1527 by secular friars Juan Rodríguez de Caraveo, Pedro Fernández, and Carmelite friar Gregorio de San Martín, who accompanied the Montejo entrada of 1527–1528. (Note: Jerónimo de Aguilar, a Franciscan friar, had been resident in the pre-Columbian Ekab Province from 1511 to late February 1519, but is not known to have engaged in missionary work, having been a slave or servant of the batab or mayor of Xaman Ha' (González Hernández 2018b, para. 2–4).) The first known Christian baptisms in the peninsula occurred in Ekab, capital of the eponymous Postclassic Mayan province, during or shortly after an assembly of the province's mayors, held at some point during December 1527 and March 1528. Franciscans began missionary work in Chak'anputun, capital of a Postclassic Mayan province of the same name, sometime during 1535 and 1537. (Note: Reputedly, at the initiative of Jacobo de Testera, custodian of the Franciscan Order in New Spain (Chamberlain 1948, p. 311). The first mission, believed to have been composed of Testera and four companions, was expelled by a military expedition under Lorenzo de Godoy (Chamberlain 1948, pp. 311–313). Testera sent a second mission to Spanish Yucatán in 1542. This latter mission, composed of four friars (Luis de Villalpando, Lorenzo de Bienvenida, Melchor de Benavente, and Juan de Herrera), arrived in 1545, and proved more enduring than the first (Chamberlain 1948, p. 313). An additional four Franciscan friars (Nicolás de Albalate, Angel Maldonado, Miguel de Vera, Juan de la Puerta) arrived in 1546 or 1547, and a further eight (including Francisco de Bustamante and Diego de Landa) in 1549 (Chamberlain 1948, pp. 313–314, 317). The Franciscans held their first chapter meeting on 29 September 1549, and were established as a province in 1561 (with Landa as the first provincial superior) (Chamberlain 1948, pp. 317–318). Non-Franciscan regular clergy were prohibited from missionary work in Spanish Yucatán sometime thereafter (Chamberlain 1948, p. 319).)

=== Education ===
Hispano–Christian teaching of Mayan children and adults was begun by Franciscan friars at the Provincial Convent of St. Francis, Mérida, in 1547. (Note: An assembly of the municipality's batabo'ob or mayors was held in Mérida in early 1547, during which these were invited to send their children to the Franciscan school in town, though at least some children were rather sent to said school by encomenderos (Chamberlain 1948, pp. 315–316). The convent, Convento Provincial de San Francisco, was demolished in 1869 (Ordaz Tamayo 2004, p. 61).) Instruction included Roman Catholic doctrine for all Mayan children and adults, (Latin) reading and writing for children of pre-eminent Mayan families, and choral music for Mayan adults. (Note: Attendance for doctrinal studies was compulsory at least for Mayan adults (Chamberlain 1948, p. 321).)

At least some chilamo'ob or priests (of Mayan polytheism), and members of ch'ibalo'ob or noble houses, are known to have vigorously opposed Franciscan indoctrination.

== Government ==
The capitulaciones de conquista or letters patent for the conquest of Yucatán, granted on 8 December 1526 by Charles I of Spain to Francisco de Montejo in Granada, set out the first constitution of Spanish Yucatán. (Note: In addition to Spanish civil law, including a real provisión or royal ordinance of 17 November 1526 regulating New World conquests (incorporated by reference in Montejo's letters patent), and the Spanish Requerimiento (Chamberlain 1948, pp. 22–25). A digitised copy of these letters patent is available at the Portal de Archivos Españoles under call number INDIFERENTE,415,L.1,F.90V-98V.)

Absolute authority was vested in the Spanish sovereign, advised and assisted by the Casa de Contratación and the Council of the Indies. (Note: Though absolute power over spiritual matters rested with the Roman Catholic pontiff (Chamberlain 1948, pp. 25–28).) Directly subordinate was the adelantado, governor, captain general, and alguacil mayor of Yucatán, who was afforded executive, legislative and judicial authority over the province. (Note: Though oficiales reales or royal officers, appointed by and responsible to the Spanish sovereign, administered part of the province's treasury (Chamberlain 1948, p. 21).) Spanish Yucatán was partitioned into municipios or municipalities, each administered by a designated cabildo or municipal-and-town council. (Note: See, for instance, the October 1527 founding of Salamanca de Xelha in Chamberlain 1948, p. 36.) Said municipalities were further subdivided into Mayan or encomienda settlements, administered by an encomendero and a resident cacique, and Spanish or non-encomienda settlements, administered by a cabildo. (Note: See, for instance, the October 1527 designation of Xelha and Zama, pre-Columbian Mayan towns in the Ekab Province, as encomienda towns in Chamberlain 1948, p. 39.)

The Real Audiencia of Mexico, established by real cédula or royal decree on 13 December 1527, was thereby set up as a superior court of judicature for Spanish Yucatán. (Note: The Real Audiencia of Guatemala, established by real cédula or royal decree on 20 November 1542, held jurisdiction over Spanish Yucatán from–: 1. 13 September 1543 to 23 April 1548 (Chamberlain 1948, pp. 182, 285, Lázaro de la Escosura 2004, sec. 3), 2. 7 July 1550 to 8 September 1563 (Chamberlain 1948, pp. 306–307, Lázaro de la Escosura 2004, sec. 3), 3. 16 October 1814 to 27 September 1821 (Lázaro de la Escosura 2004, sec. 3).; Furthermore, it exercised de facto authority over Spanish Yucatán from 24 April 1548 to 6 July 1550 (Chamberlain 1948, pp. 286, 292–307).) The province was made an administrative district of the Viceroyalty of New Spain upon or shortly after the latter's formation on 17 April 1535. (Note: Antonio de Mendoza y Pacheco was appointed viceroy of New Spain on 17 April 1535, but did not assume office until 14 November 1535 (Semboloni Capitani 2014, pp. 39, 47). Spanish Yucatán was made a province of New Spain prior to 1553 (Semboloni Capitani 2014, pp. 71–74). A real cédula or royal decree of 23 April 1548 directed the viceroy to oversee the adoption of a number of measures regarding Mayan residents of the province (Chamberlain 1948, p. 285).) The New Laws of 20 November 1542 rendered null and void some parts of the adelantado's letters patent. The latter were further derogated from on 13 May 1549, upon the adelantado's suspension from the offices of governor, captain general, and alguacil mayor of Spanish Yucatán.

== Economy ==
Francisco de Montejo's letters patent of 8 December 1526 incorporated a number of provisions designed to attract Spanish settlers to the Yucatán peninsula, including–

1. assignment of conquered Mayan settlements in encomiendas,
2. authorisation for a limited slave trade in Mayan prisoners, (Note: The New Laws of 20 November 1542 forbade said trade (Chamberlain 1948, pp. 280–281).)
3. partial tax breaks from the quinto real, almojarifazgo, and salt tax,
4. grants of two caballerías and two solares,
5. authorisation to employ court fines for local public works,
6. authorisation to employ the diezmo for local missionary work.

Conquistadors had initially hoped to find significant deposits of gold and precious metals in the Yucatán peninsula. As the conquest wore on, it became increasingly apparent that none such were to be had. Consequently, agriculture was settled on as the primary economic activity of Spanish Yucatán. (Note: Old World flora and fauna were introduced during the Spanish conquest, notably including draught and farm animals, crops (eg cabbages, lettuces, turnips, onions, sugar cane), and fruit trees (eg citruses, figs, pomegranates, dates, coconuts, plantains, sapodillas) (Chamberlain 1948, p. 330). These did not displace the Mesoamerican staples (eg turkeys, cotton, maize, squash, beans, peppers) (Chamberlain 1948, p. 330). See, for instance, the Columbian exchange.) Some commerce, especially in dye woods, similarly developed. (Note: At least some Postclassic Mayan industries (including salt, beeswax, and cotton textile production) were maintained (Chamberlain 1948, p. 333). Regarding dye woods, conquistador Marcos de Ayala is believed to have introduced the native logwood dye to the Spanish market, while Hernando de Bracamonte is credited with the introduction of the Old World indigo dye to the peninsula (Chamberlain 1948, p. 332).)

Mayan cotton mantas were made legal tender in late 1542.

== See also ==
- History of Belize
- History of Central America
- History of Mexico
- Republic of Yucatán – nineteenth-century sovereign state in the Yucatán peninsula
- Caste War of Yucatán – nineteenth-century Hispano-Mayan conflict in the Yucatán Peninsula

== Notes and references ==
=== Full citations ===
1. Aimers, James J. (17 August 2007). "What Maya Collapse? Terminal Classic Variation in the Maya Lowlands". Journal of Archaeological Research. 15 (4): 329–377. doi:10.1007/s10814-007-9015-x. S2CID 145053177.
2. Alcalá Erosa, Raúl (1998). Historia y vestigios de la ciudadela de San Benito (2nd ed.). Dirección de Desarrollo Urbano del H. Ayuntamiento de Mérida. ISBN 968691806X. OCLC 47915779.
3. Andrews, Anthony P. (1984). "The Political Geography of the Sixteenth Century Yucatan Maya : Comments and Revisions". Journal of Anthropological Research. 40 (4): 589–596. doi:10.1086/jar.40.4.3629799. JSTOR 3629799. S2CID 163743879.
4. Arranz Márquez, Luis (2018a). "Diego de Velázquez de Cuellar". Diccionario Biográfico electrónico. Real Academia de la Historia. Archived from the original on 16 May 2022.
5. Arranz Márquez, Luis (2018b). "Pedro de Ledesma". Diccionario Biográfico electrónico. Real Academia de la Historia. Archived from the original on 8 October 2022.
6. Awe, Jaime J.; Helmke, Christophe (April 2015). "The Sword and the Olive Jar : Material evidence of seventeenth-century Maya-European Interaction in central Belize". Ethnohistory. 62 (2): 333–360. doi:10.1215/00141801-2854369.
7. Ayuntamiento de Mérida (2007). "Datos de interés". Mérida : Un lugar lleno de historia. Ayuntamiento de Mérida. Archived from the original on 16 July 2011.
8. Barrera Vásquez, Alfredo; Bastarrachea Manzano, Juan Ramón; Brito Sansores, William; Vermont Salas, Refugio; Dzul Góngora, David; Dzul Poot, Domingo, eds. (1980). Diccionario maya Cordemex : maya-español, español-maya (1st ed.). Merida: Ediciones Cordemex. OCLC 7550928.
9. Baudot, Georges (1986). "Dissidences indiennes et complicités flibustières dans la Yucatán du XVIIe siècle". Caravelle Cahiers du Monde Hispanique et Luso-Brésilien. 46: 21–33. ISSN 2272-9828.
10. Bialuschewski, Arne (1 January 2017). "Slaves of the Buccaneers : Mayas in captivity in the second half of the seventeenth century". Ethnohistory. 64 (1): 41–63. doi:10.1215/00141801-3688359.
11. Bolland, Orlando N. (June 1975). The Formation of a Colonial Society : Belize, from conquest to Crown colony (PhD). Hull, Eng.: University of Hull. OCLC 500387462.
12. Breuer, Kimberly H. (1993). Colonies of Happenstance : The English settlements in Central America, 1525–1787 (MA). Arlington, TX: University of Texas. OCLC 35313362.
13. Bulmer-Thomas, Barbara; Bulmer-Thomas, Victor (19 November 2016). "Los orígenes del asentamiento de Belice / The Origins of the Belize Settlement". TEMPUS Revista en Historia General. 4: 137–160. ISSN 2422-2178.
14. Calderón Quijano, José Antonio (1944). Belice : 1663 (?) - 1821. Publicaciones de la Escuela de Estudios Hispanoamericanos de la Universidad de Sevilla. Vol. 5. Seville: Escuela de Estudios Hispanoamericanos. OCLC 2481064.
15. Camille, Michael A.; Espejo-Saavedra, Rafael (1996). "Historical Geography of the Belizean Logwood Trade". Yearbook (Conference of Latin Americanist Geographers). 22: 77–85. JSTOR 25765830.
16. Cerón Grajales, Russell (January–June 2014). "Las instituciones jurídicas en la conquista de Yucatán y fundación de Mérida". Revista de la Facultad de Derecho de México. 64 (261): 219–242. doi:10.22201/fder.24488933e.2014.261.60287.
17. Chamberlain, Robert S. (1948). The Conquest and Colonization of Yucatan 1517–1550. Carnegie Institution of Washington Publication. Vol. 582. Washington, DC: Carnegie Institution of Washington. hdl:2027/mdp.39015014584406.
18. Chuchiak IV, John F. (2003). "By faith, not arms : The role of franciscan reducciones and the frontier mission experience in the subjugation of the Maya hinterland of colonial Yucatán, 1602–1672". Svensk Missionstidskrift. 91 (2): 215–248. ISSN 0346-217X.
19. Clendinnen, Inga (2003). Ambivalent Conquests : Maya and Spaniard in Yucatan, 1517–1570. Cambridge Latin American Studies. Vol. 61 (2nd ed.). Cambridge: Cambridge University Press. ISBN 0521820316.
20. Conover Blancas, Carlos (2013). Llave y custodia de esta provincia : el presidio de San Felipe Bacalar ante los asentamientos británicos del sur - oriente de la Península de Yucatán (1779 - 1798) (MA). Mexico City: Universidad Nacional Autónoma de México.
21. Contreras Sánchez, Alicia del C. (1 July 1987). "El palo de tinte, motivo de un conflicto entre dos naciones, 1670-1802". Historia Mexicana. 37 (1): 49–74. ISSN 2448-6531.
22. Craig, Alan K. (April 1969). "Logwood as a Factor in the Settlement of British Honduras". Caribbean Studies. 9 (1): 53–62. JSTOR 25612108.
23. Curiosity Media (2021a). "Provincia". SpanishDict. SpanishDict.com. Archived from the original on 31 August 2023.
24. Curiosity Media (2021b). "De". SpanishDict. SpanishDict.com. Archived from the original on 4 February 2023.
25. Curiosity Media (2021c). "Yucatán". SpanishDict. SpanishDict.com. Archived from the original on 24 August 2021.
26. Demarest, Arthur A.; Rice, Prudence M.; Rice, Don S., eds. (2004). The Terminal Classic in the Maya Lowlands : Collapse, Transition and Transformation. Boulder, CO: University Press of Colorado. ISBN 0870817396.
27. Fancourt, Charles St. John (1854). The History of Yucatan : From its discovery to the close of the seventeenth century. London: John Murray. OL 6914420M.
28. Finamore, Daniel R. (1994). Sailors and Slaves on the Wood-Cutting Frontier : Archaeology of the British bay settlement, Belize (PhD). Boston, MA: Boston University. OCLC 35313422.
29. Galvin, Peter R. (December 1991). The Pirates' Wake : A geography of piracy and pirates as geographers in colonial Spanish America, 1536–1718 (PhD). Baton Rouge, LA: Louisiana State University. OCLC 753888354.
30. García Bernal, Manuela Cristina (2018). "Francisco de Montejo". Diccionario Biográfico electrónico. Real Academia de la Historia. Archived from the original on 8 June 2023.
31. Gerhard, Peter (1993). The Southeast Frontier of New Spain (Rev. ed.). Norman, OK: University of Oklahoma Press. ISBN 0806125438.
32. González Hernández, Cristina (2018a). "Gonzalo Guerrero". Diccionario Biográfico electrónico. Real Academia de la Historia. Archived from the original on 24 March 2023.
33. González Hernández, Cristina (2018b). "Jerónimo de Aguilar". Diccionario Biográfico electrónico. Real Academia de la Historia. Archived from the original on 30 May 2023.
34. Graham, Elizabeth (2011). Maya Christians and their Churches in Sixteenth-Century Belize. Maya Studies. Gainesville, FL: University Press of Florida. ISBN 9780813036663.
35. Jones, Grant D. (1989). Maya Resistance to Spanish Rule : Time and history on a colonial frontier (1st ed.). Albuquerque, NM: University of New Mexico Press. ISBN 082631161X.
36. Jones, Grant D. (1998). The Conquest of the Last Maya Kingdom. Stanford, CA: Stanford University Press. ISBN 0804733171.
37. Lázaro de la Escosura, Pilar (17 May 2004). "Audiencia de Guatemala". Censo-Guía de Archivos de España e Iberoamérica. Ministerio de Cultura y Deporte del Gobierno de España. Archived from the original on 30 August 2021.
38. Lehmann, Christian (16 December 2018). "Ortografía". La lengua maya de Yucatán. Christian Lehmann. Archived from the original on 31 August 2023.
39. León Pinelo, Antonio de; Solórzano Pereira, Juan de (1681). Recopilacion de leyes de los reynos de la Indias : mandadas imprimir y pvblicar por la Magestad Catolica del Rey Don Carlos II nuestro señor (Report). Vol. 2. Madrid: Ivlian de Paredes. OCLC 367528936. OL 6757246M.
40. Levene, Ricardo, ed. (1938). Colaboraciones (sección historia política). IIº Congreso Internacional de Historia de América reunido en Buenos Aires en los días 5 a 14 de julio de 1937 : conmemoración del IV centenario de la fundación de la ciudad de Buenos Aires. Vol. 2. Buenos Aires: Academia Nacional de la Historia. OCLC 252893403.
41. Lutz, Wolfgang; Prieto, Leonel; Sanderson, Warren, eds. (July 2000). Population, Development, and Environment on the Yucatán Peninsula : From ancient Maya to 2030 (Report). IIASA Research Report. Vol. RR-00-14. Vienna: International Institute for Applied Systems Analysis. ISBN 3704501387.
42. Marcus, Linda C. (1990). English Influence on Belize and the Petén Region of Northern Guatemala, 1630 to 1763 (PhD). Dallas, TX: Southern Methodist University. OCLC 24080926.
43. Marley, David F. (2008). Wars of the Americas : A chronology of armed conflict in the western hemisphere, 1492 to the present (2nd ed.). Santa Barbara, CA: ABC-CLIO. ISBN 9781598841008.
44. Marley, David F. (2010). Pirates of the Americas. Vol. 1. Santa Barbara, CA: ABC-CLIO. ISBN 9781598842012.
45. McJunkin, David M. (1991). Logwood : An inquiry into the historical biogeography of Haematoxylum campeachianum L. and related dyewoods of the neotropics (PhD). Los Angeles, CA: University of California. OCLC 24057056.
46. Molina Solís, Juan Francisco (1896). Historia del descubrimiento y conquista de Yucatán, con una reseña de la historia antigua de esta península (1st ed.). Mérida de Yucatán: Impr. y lit. R. Caballero. OCLC 6955452. OL 23361775M.
47. Molina Solís, Juan F. (1904). Historia de Yucatán durante la dominación española. Vol. 1. Merida, Yuc.: Imprenta de la Lotería del Estado. OCLC 1181744392.
48. Molina Solís, Juan F. (1910). Historia de Yucatán durante la dominación española. Vol. 2. Merida, Yuc.: Imprenta de la Lotería del Estado. OCLC 835497317.
49. Molina Solís, Juan F. (1913). Historia de Yucatán durante la dominación española. Vol. 3. Merida, Yuc.: Imprenta de la Lotería del Estado. OCLC 1181268171.
50. Nairn, Alan E. M; Stehli, Francis G, eds. (1975). The Gulf of Mexico and the Caribbean. The Ocean Basins and Margins. Vol. 3. Boston, MA: Springer. doi:10.1007/978-1-4684-8535-6. ISBN 978-1-4684-8537-0.
51. Ojeda, Jorge Victoria (July 2019). "El arribo de los españoles a la Peninsula de Yucatán y el inicio del cambio en el paisaje biocultural de la región, siglo XVI". Boletín americanista. 78: 175–195. doi:10.1344/BA2019.78.1010 (inactive 11 July 2025).
52. Ordaz Tamayo, Marisol del C. (3 May 2004). Arquitectura religiosa virreinal de Yucatán : el conocimiento històrico-técnico de las iglesias con estructura espacial conventual : el conocimiento de la arquitectura histórica como condicionante de la restauración (PhD). Barcelona: Universitat Politècnica de Catalunya. hdl:2117/93427. ISBN 8468881554.
53. Orosa Díaz, Jaime (1999). Historia de Yucatán (16th reprint ed.). Merida, Yuc.: Universidad Autónoma de Yucatán. ISBN 9686160000. OCLC 48366615.
54. Oxford University Press (2021). "Yucatán". UK English Dictionary. Lexico.com. Archived from the original on 6 July 2022.
55. Quezada, Sergio (2011). La colonización de los mayas peninsulares. Biblioteca Básica de Yucatán. Vol. 18. Merida, Yuc.: Secretaría de Educación del Gobierno del Estado de Yucatán. ISBN 9786077824275.
56. Quezada, Serio; Robles Castellanos, Fernando; Andrews, Anthony P., eds. (2014). Yucatán en el orden colonial, 1517–1811. Historia General de Yucatán. Vol. 2. Merida, Yuc.: Universidad Autónoma de Yucatán. ISBN 9786079405014.
57. Reichert, Rafal (January–June 2017). "El golfo de Honduras: estrategias geopolíticas y militares de una frontera imperial, siglos XVI-XVIII". Tzintzun Revista de Estudios Históricos. 65: 9–40. ISSN 1870-719X.
58. Rice, Prudence M. (2004). Maya Political Science : Time, Astrology, and the Cosmos. Linda Schele Series in Maya and Pre-Columbian Studies (1st ed.). Austin, TX: University of Texas Press. ISBN 0292702612.
59. Roys, Ralph L. (1957). The Political Geography of the Yucatan Maya. Carnegie Institution of Washington Publication. Vol. 613 (1st ed.). Washington, DC: Carnegie Institution of Washington. OCLC 1851713.
60. Rubio Mañé, José I. (1938). El Concept Histórico de Capitanía General : Revillagigedo y Yucatán (Pamphlet). Merida, Yuc.: Compañía Tipográfica Yucateca. OCLC 970564941.
61. Rushton, Elizabeth A. C. (December 2014). Under the Shade I Flourish : An environmental history of northern Belize over the last three thousand five hundred years (PhD). Nottingham, Eng.: University of Nottingham. OCLC 1064648060.
62. Saucedo González, José I. (10 October 2014). Poder político y jurídico en Yucatán en el siglo XVI. Doctrina Jurídica. Mexico City: Universidad Nacional Autónoma de México y Universidad Autónoma de Yucatán. ISBN 9786070255298.
63. Saville, Marshall H. (November 1918). "The Discovery of Yucatan in 1517 by Francisco Hernandez de Cordoba". Geographical Review. 6 (5): 436–448. doi:10.2307/207701. JSTOR 207701.
64. Semboloni Capitani, Lara (2014). La construcción de la autoridad virreinal en nueva España, 1535-1595. Mexico City: El Colegio de México. ISBN 9786074626674. JSTOR j.ctt15hvw3p.
65. Sharer, Robert J.; Traxler, Loa P., eds. (2006). The ancient Maya (6th ed.). Stanford, CA: Stanford University Press. ISBN 0804748160.
66. Torre Revello, José (1 October 1956). "El viaje de Yañez Pinzón y Díaz de Solís (1508)". Historia Mexicana. 6 (2): 233–246. ISSN 0185-0172.
67. Varela Marcos, Jesús (2018a). "Juan Díaz de Solís". Diccionario Biográfico electrónico. Real Academia de la Historia. Archived from the original on 7 December 2022.
68. Varela Marcos, Jesús (2018b). "Vicente Yáñez Pinzón". Diccionario Biográfico electrónico. Real Academia de la Historia. Archived from the original on 8 December 2022.
69. Vazquez Barke, Gabriela (August 2012). Bacalar en el siglo XVII : colonización y resistencia (MA). Mexico City: Centro de Investigaciones y Estudios Superiores en Antropología Social. Archived from the original on 31 August 2023.
70. Vazquez Barke, Gabriela (2016). Los poderes y los hombres : El Golfo de Honduras en tiempos de disputa (PhD). Mexico City: Centro de Investigaciones y Estudios Superiores en Antropología Social. Archived from the original on 31 August 2023.
