= State flags of Mexico =

Most Mexican states do not have an official flag. For these states, a de facto flag is used for civil and state purposes. State flags of Mexico have a 4:7 ratio and typically consist of a white background charged with the state's coat of arms.

At least fourteen states have official flags: Baja California Sur, Coahuila, Colima, Durango, Guanajuato, Guerrero, Jalisco, Oaxaca, Querétaro, Quintana Roo, Tabasco, Tamaulipas, Tlaxcala, and Yucatán. Except for those of Guanajuato, Jalisco, Tlaxcala and Yucatán, each official flag is simply a white background charged with the state's coat of arms.

Two states have provisions in their constitutions explicitly declaring that there shall be no official state flag, Baja California and Campeche.

== De jure flags ==
Guanajuato
(adopted December 20, 2023)

Jalisco
(adopted February 22, 2007)

Tlaxcala
(adopted October 30, 2011)

Yucatán
(adopted August 13, 2024)

== De jure coat of arms in a flag ==
Baja California Sur
(adopted December 31, 2017)

Coahuila
(adopted December 27, 2013)

Colima
(adopted February 24, 2018)

Durango
(adopted March 9, 2014)

Guerrero
(adopted October 25, 2019)

Oaxaca
(adopted March 12, 2020)

Querétaro
(adopted September 22, 2015)

Quintana Roo
(adopted January 1, 2016)

Tabasco
(adopted February 19, 2020)

Tamaulipas
(adopted December 15, 2011)

== De facto flags ==
Aguascalientes

Baja California

Campeche

Chiapas

Chihuahua

Hidalgo

Mexico

Mexico City

Michoacán de Ocampo

Morelos

Nayarit

Nuevo León

Puebla

San Luis Potosi

Sinaloa

Sonora

Veracruz de Ignacio de la Llave

Zacatecas

== De facto flags with special designs ==
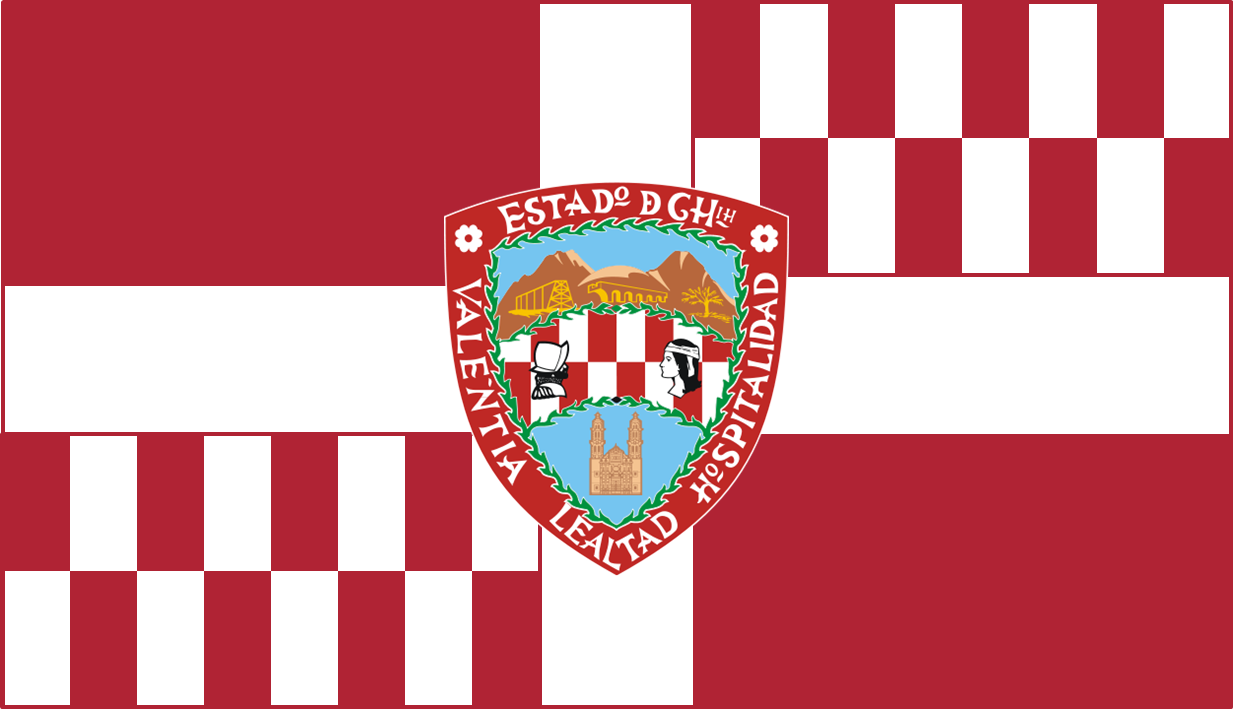
Unofficial flag of Chihuahua, a civil flag used by students and people in Chihuahua City. It was created by Daniel Martínez Miranda in 2009.

A black and white variant of the Mexico City flag, with other variants existing. It is used more often than the standard color Mexico City coat of arms on a white field.

Flag of Coahuila y Tejas since 1836, proposed by governor of Coahuila, Manolo Jiménez, as the state flag of Coahuila.

Veracruz de Ignacio de la Llave, it is just like the standard coat of arms in a white field flag, but with green and red corners. This is the official flag of the state's government, but an unofficial flag of the state itself.

== Historical ==
Coahuila y Tejas (1836)

Soconusco (1843)

Republic of the Rio Grande (1840)

Republic of Yucatán (1841–1848)

Republic of Baja California (1853)

Republic of Sonora (1853–1854)

Republic of Sonora (1852/1854)

Yucatán (unofficially until 1989), used today as the unofficial flag of Mérida

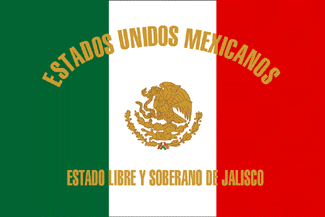
Jalisco (1972, unofficially from 1973–1998)

Jalisco (unofficially from 1998–2008)

Tlaxcala (unofficially from 1998–2016)

Jalisco (unofficially from 2008–2011)

Jalisco (2011–2013)

Quintana Roo (2013–2016)

Guanajuato (unofficially until 2023)

== Gallery ==
=== De jure ===
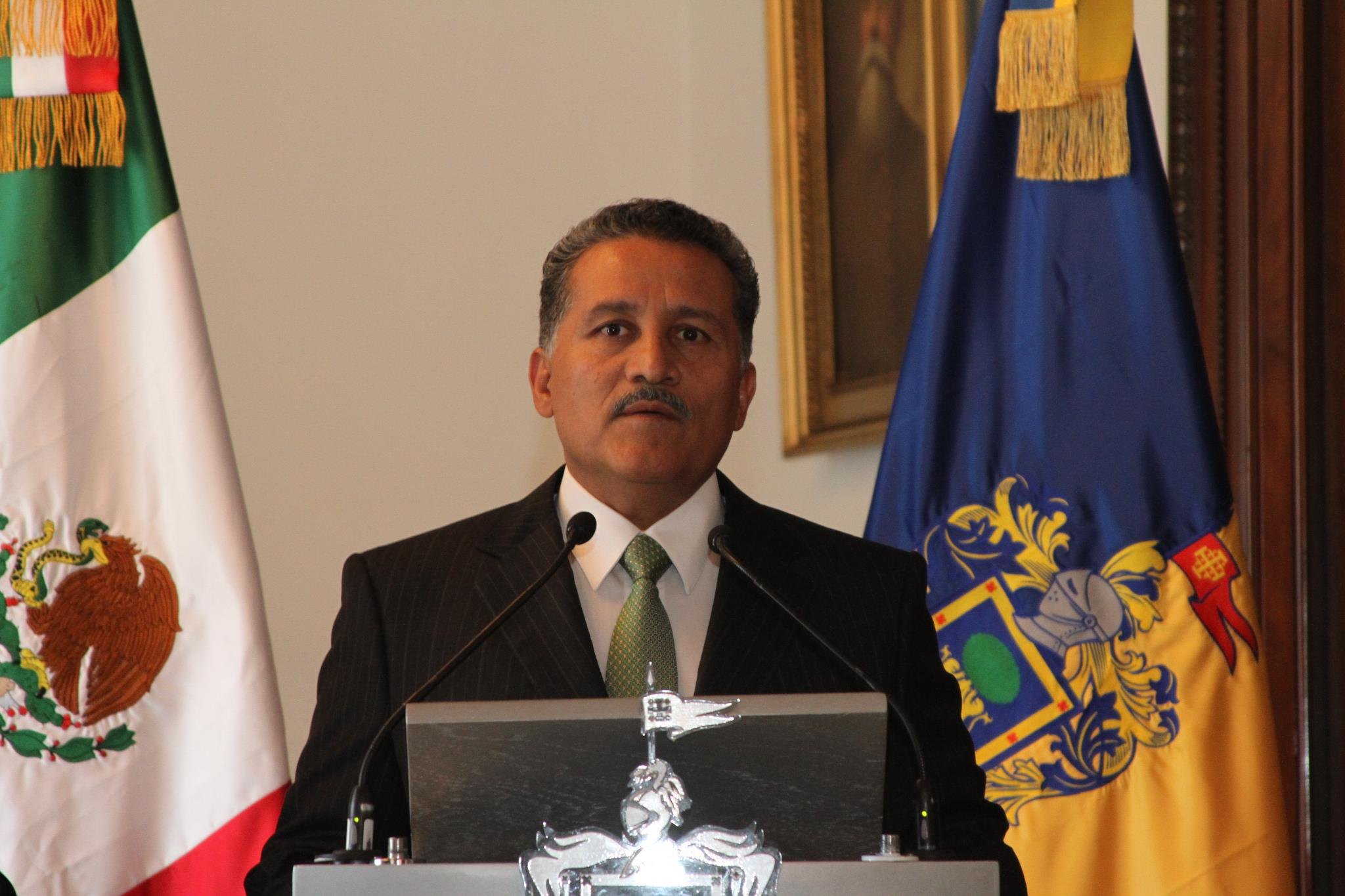
Flag of Jalisco

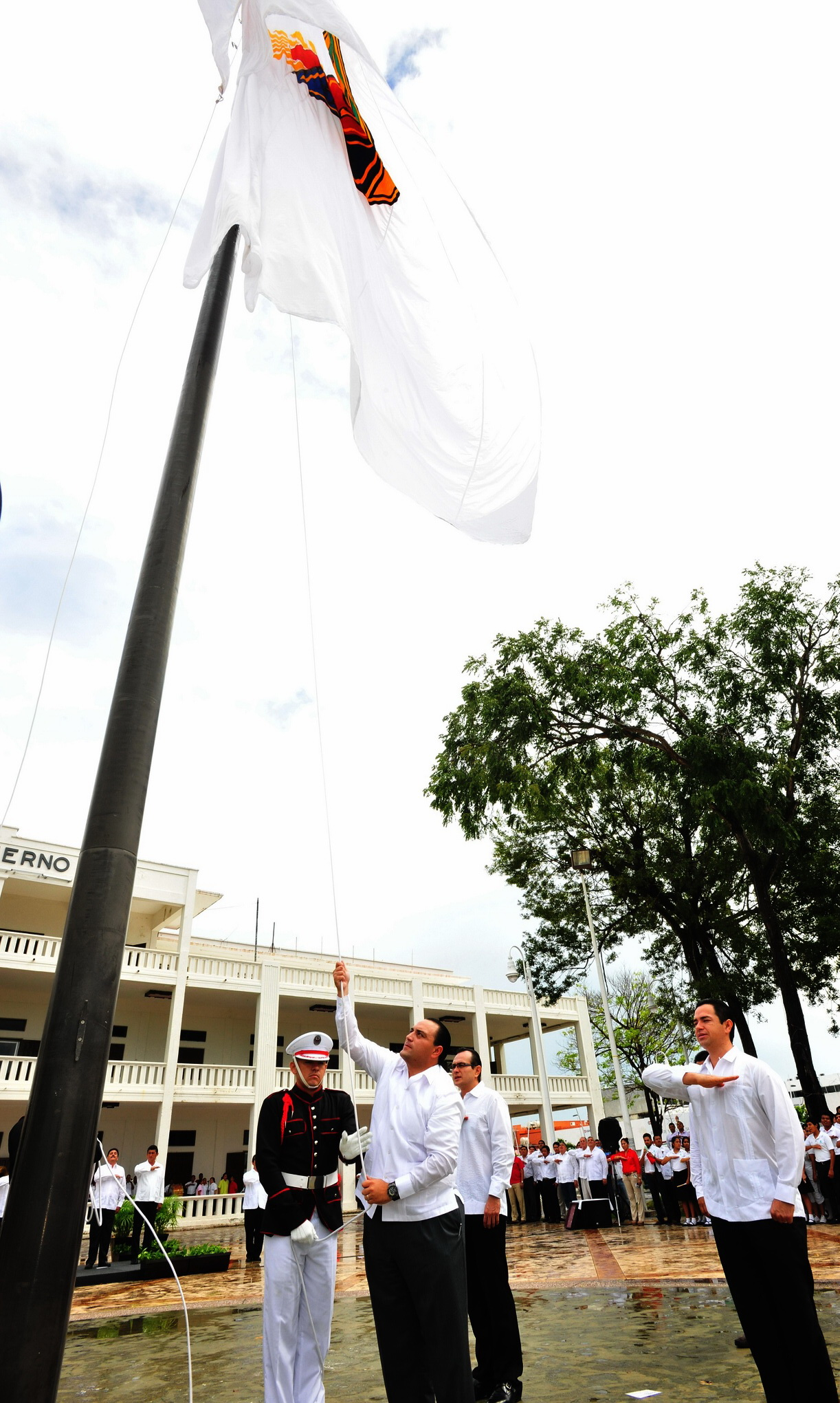
Flag of Quintana Roo

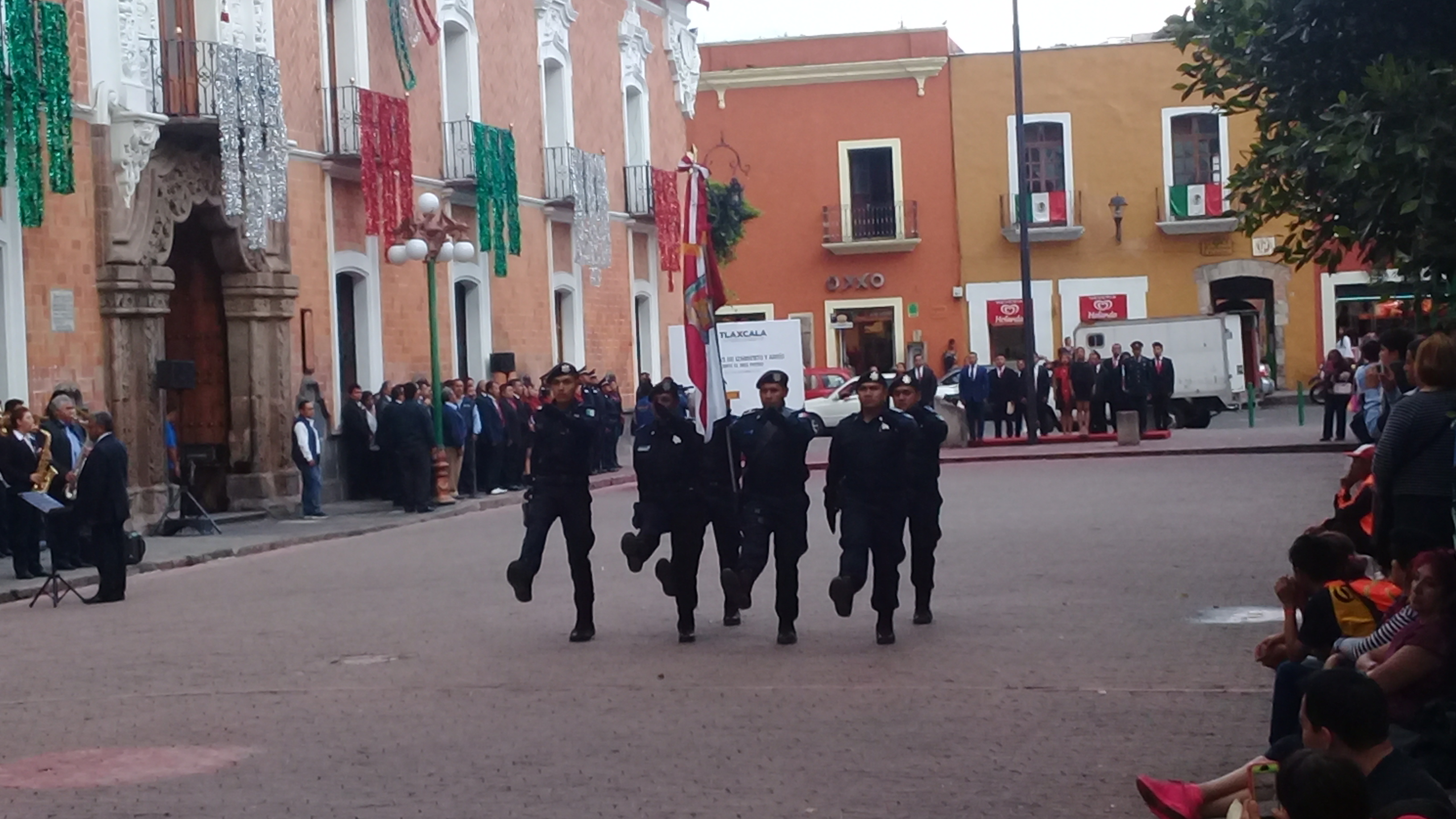
Flag of Tlaxcala

=== De facto ===
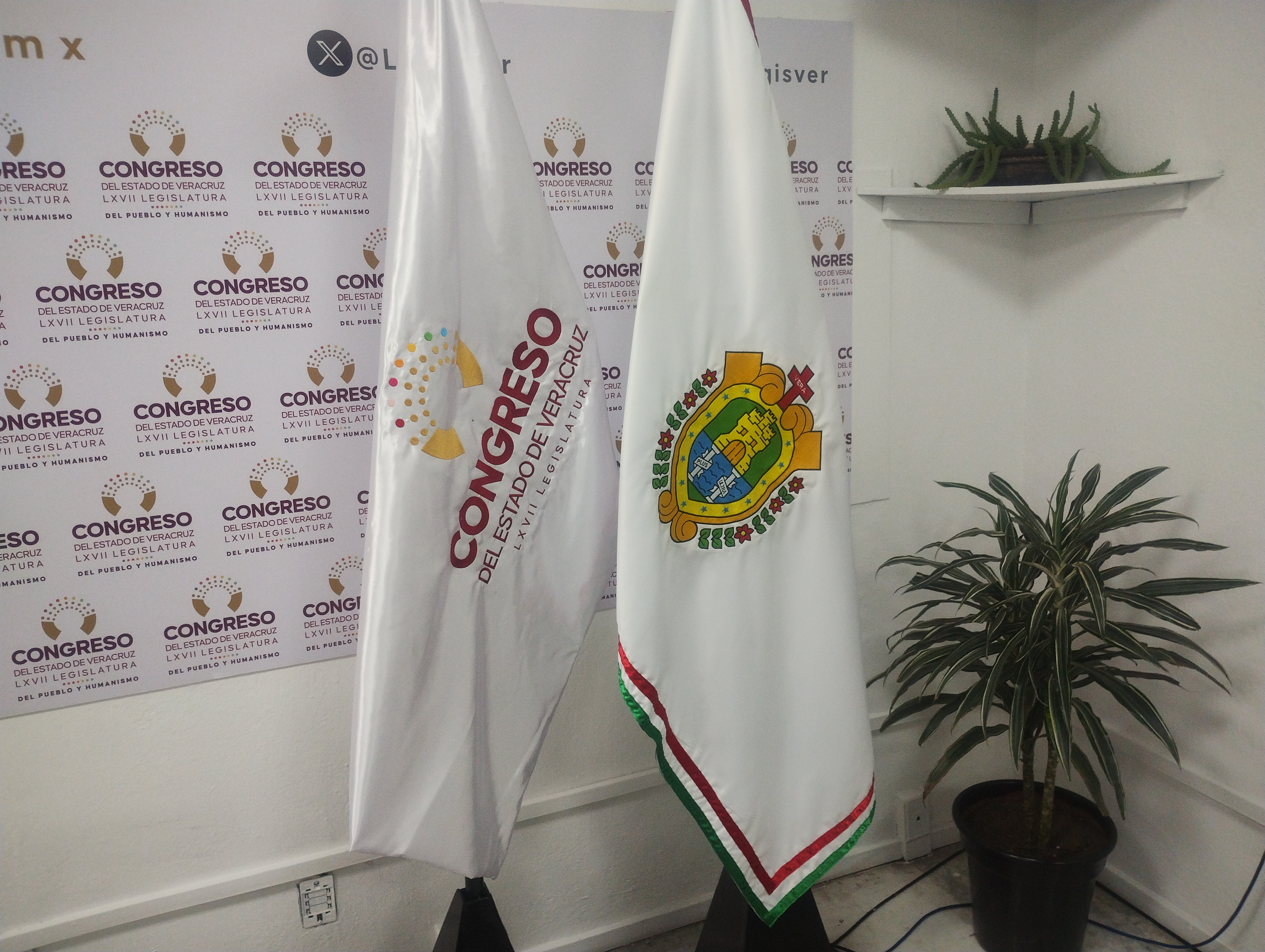
Government flag of Veracruz

== See also ==
- List of Mexican flags
- Flag of Guanajuato
- Flag of Jalisco
- Flag of Tlaxcala
- Flag of Yucatán
