= Coat of arms of Jalisco =

Coat of arms of Jalisco Escudo de Jalisco
- Coat of Arms of Jalisco

Versions
- Armiger: State of Jalisco
- Adopted: 1989

The coat of arms of Jalisco (Spanish: Escudo de Jalisco, lit. "state shield of Jalisco") is a symbol of the Free and Sovereign State of Jalisco in Mexico.

This shield symbolizes the nobility and lordship of the city of Guadalajara; virtues that the Spanish crown recognized in the work and dangers that the city's inhabitants had endured in the conquest and settlement of the city. When the state of Jalisco was founded, the shield became a symbol of the federal entity.

The above confirms the explanation that historians and heraldists give about the use of enamels (colors and metals) and figures in the coats of arms. These scholars affirm that these elements confer duties on the inhabitants of the state to which the privilege of arms is granted.

== Symbolism ==
The coat of arms of Jalisco features a blue field (azure) with a golden tree at its center (often identified as a holm oak or pine), and two rampant lions in natural gold color facing each other with their forepaws on the tree’s trunk . Encircling the shield is a gold bordure charged with seven red saltire crosses . Each element carries historical meaning. The blue background traditionally signifies truth and loyalty – virtues sometimes interpreted as representing serenity and justice . The central tree symbolizes steadfastness and perseverance in the face of adversity . The pair of lions denotes a courageous, warlike spirit and the sovereignty of the state . The gold border with seven red crosses is said to represent favor, protection, and purity of sentiment . Heraldists note that the red saltire crosses (similar to the Spanish Cross of Burgundy) underscore Jalisco’s colonial heritage under the Spanish Empire and the Crown of Castile-León . According to local tradition, these crosses also commemorate the Spanish knights who fought against the Moors during the 1227 Battle of Baeza – a victory historically associated with the Cross of St. Andrew used in Reconquista heraldry .

Atop the shield is a closed steel helmet in profile, signifying the nobility of the state and the military valor of its founders . For a crest, the helmet is surmounted by a red banner bearing a gold Jerusalem Cross, affixed to a lance . In Renaissance heraldry, the Jerusalem cross – drawn as one large cross surrounded by four smaller crosses – alludes to the five Holy Wounds of Christ and reflects the Spanish monarchs’ claim to the title “Kings of Jerusalem” as protectors of the Holy Sepulchre . This crusader emblem highlights the conquistadors’ ancestral link to the Crusades. Finally, gold-and-blue lambrequins (mantling in acanthus-leaf style) flow from the helmet around the shield, providing an ornate frame that emphasizes the arms’ Spanish heraldic lineage and the state’s enduring honor.

=== Elements ===
A red flag, charged with a yellow cross of Jerusalem, on the crest or upper part of the state coat of arms.

A lambrequins of gold and blue alternated with Medieval European bascinet, upper part of the state coat of arms.

A blue field, a holly oak of sinople outlined, two lions rampant of gold, opposite to forehead and the legs on the trunk, embroidery is of gold, consists of seven arms of gules.

== History ==
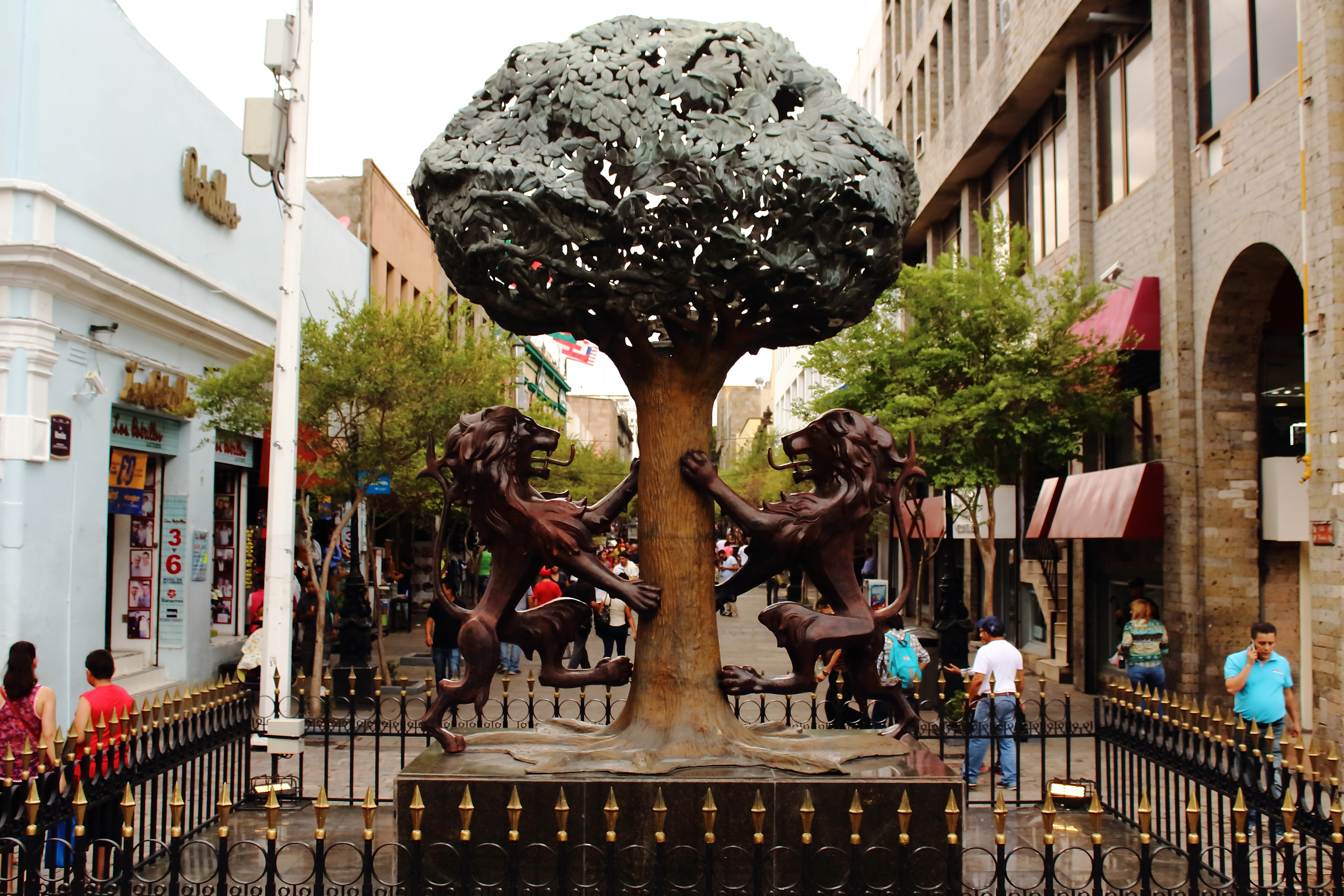
Seal of Guadalajara.

Charles V, Holy Roman Emperor, granted the shield and the title of city to Guadalajara in 1539. On 7 November 1989, decree number 13661 was published in the Official State Gazette.

On 16 June 2023, Enrique Alfaro governor of Jalisco state celebrates 200 years free and sovereign with people of Jalisco. The celebration included the raising of the State Coat of Arms, the State Flag and the singing of the State Anthem.

=== Historical coats ===
The symbol is used by all successive regimes in Jalisco, in different forms.

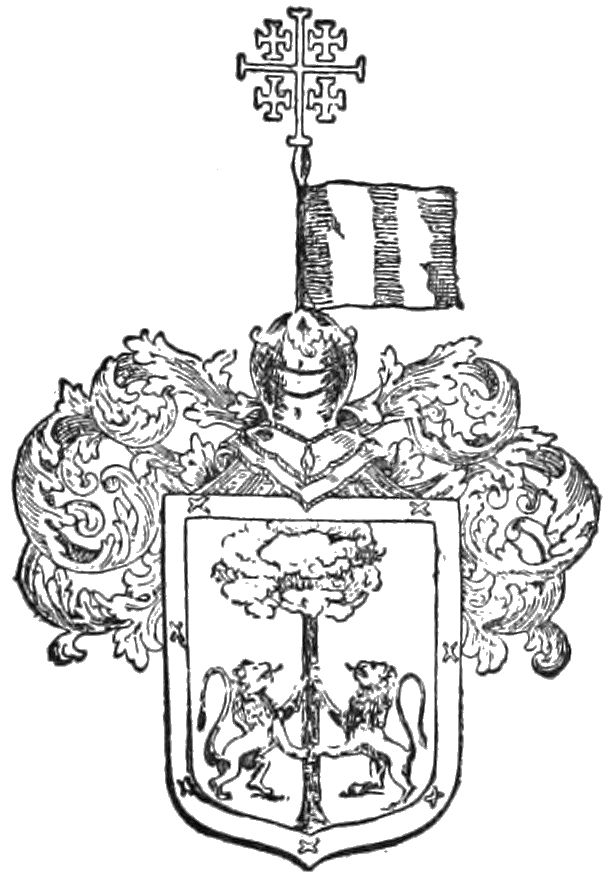
Coat of arms of Guadalajara City since 1539 to 1893.

Coat of arms of the Intendence of Guadalajara since 1793 to 1989.

Coat of arms of State of Jalisco since 1989 to 2011.

Coat of arms of State of Jalisco since 2023.

== See also ==
- Coat of arms of Mexico
- Flag of Jalisco
- Symbols of Guadalajara
