= Symbols of Guadalajara =

Symbols of the city in Jalisco, Mexico

The symbols of city of Guadalajara, Mexico, are the coat of arms or seal and the municipal flag. Other cultural symbols include the Statue of Minerva, the Hospicio Cabañas and the torta ahogada sandwich.

== Coat of arms ==
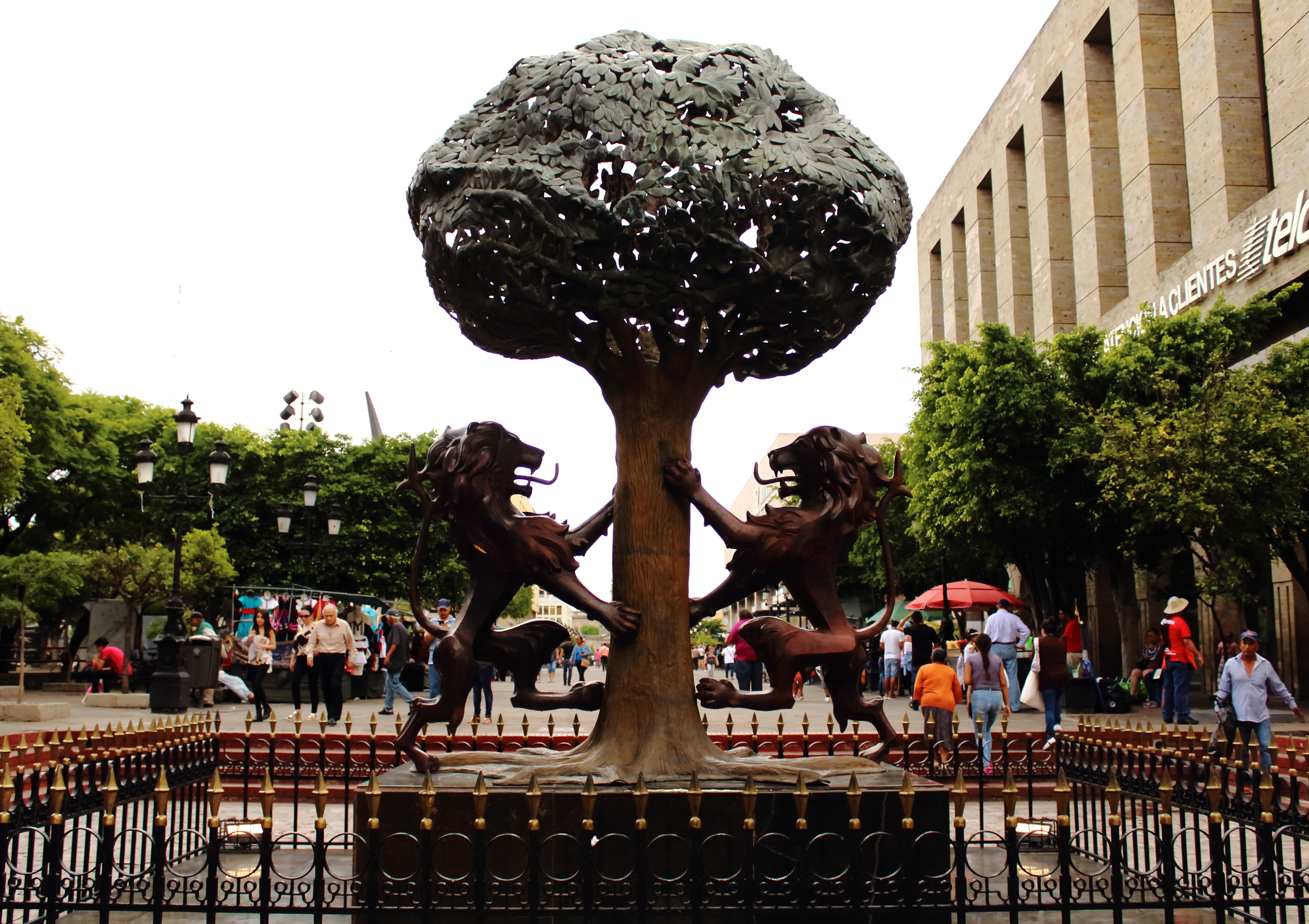
Seal of Guadalajara.

Seal of Guadalajara.

The Coat of arms or Seal of Guadalajara consists of a blue field, a pine of sinople outlined, two lions rampantes of color, opposite to forehead and the legs on the trunk, embroidery is of gold, consists of seven arms of gules. For stamp, closed helmet and for cimera a flag of gules, loaded with a cross of Jerusalem to the one that uses as shaft a lance of the same color, the lambrequins are of gold and blue alternated.

The blue field represents loyalty and serenity, the pine of sinople represents noble thoughts, the lions represent sovereignty and warlike spirit, the arms represent protection, favor and purity of the feelings. They also honor the Spanish combatants in the 1227 Battle of Baeza against the Moors in. The helmet represents nobility and victory in combat. The cross of Jerusalem signifies the conquistadors' descent from the Crusaders, and the lance signifies strength tempered by prudence.

Charles V, Holy Roman Emperor, granted the shield and the title of city to Guadalajara in 1539.

== Flag ==
Flag of Guadalajara
- Use: Civil and state flag
- Proportion: 2:3
- Adopted: 4 May 2021; 5 years ago
- Design: a rectangle divided in three horizontal stripes, Blue, Gold and Blue. At the center of the flag is the Seal of Guadalajara.
- Designed by: Francisco Medina Asencio

The flag of the city of Guadalajara is the emblem of Guadalajara and is used by the town hall as representative symbol of the city. The flag consists of 3 horizontal stripes, blue, yellow and blue respectively, in the central part of the yellow stripe is the Seal of Guadalajara conceived by the emperor Carlos V in 1539.

=== Design and symbolism ===
The colors of the flag of Guadalajara City are inspired by the flag of Jalisco. The meaning of the colors of the municipal flag are as follows:

- Gold (yellow): do good to the poor.
- Azur (blue): serve the rulers and promote agriculture.

=== History ===
The design for the flag was commissioned by Francisco Medina Ascencio, the governor of Guadalajara in 1967. The colors blue and yellow, taken from the towers of the metropolitan cathedral, singularly represent the city and can be found in the flowers of urban gardens of the city, urban equipment, taxis, and state traffic plates.

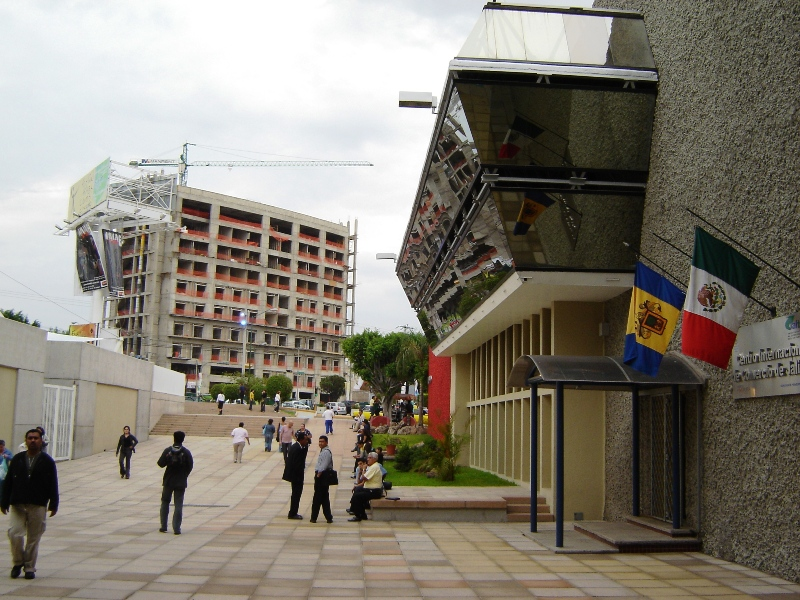
Flag of Guadalajara in Convention Center press offices

== See also ==
- List of Mexican municipal flags
