= Flag of Jalisco =

Flag

Jalisco
- Use: Civil and state flag
- Proportion: 4:7
- Adopted: May 7, 2011

The flag of Jalisco was adopted in 2011. It is colored blue and gold and bears the State Emblem in the center. The emblem has a diameter of three-quarters the width of the stripes. The ratio of the flag is 4:7. Ribbons of the same colors may be placed at the foot of the finial. The flag is one of only four Mexican states that is not simply a coat of arms set against a white background, and it is the only one without any white at all.

== Design and symbolism ==
The meaning of the colors of the state flag are as follows:

- Gold (yellow): do

- Azul (blue): serve the rulers and promote agriculture.

=== Other flags ===
Flag of the Kingdom of Galicia (16th century)

== History ==
After the independence of Mexico, Prisciliano Sánchez, governor of the Mexican state from 1825 to 1826, proposed a transitional flag for the state of Jalisco, which consists of three horizontal stripes.

In 2001, Luis Havas announced plans to create a flag for the Mexican state of Jalisco. He proposed the old flag of Manuel Rodríguez, consisting of two blue stripes and a stripe of gold with the State Emblem in the center; it resembled the flag of the New Galicia or Intendence of Guadalajara. A flag was adopted in February 2008, which was then replaced by the current one on 7 May 2011.

On June 16 2023, Enrique Alfaro governor of Jalisco state celebrates 200 years free and sovereign with people of Jalisco. The celebration included the raising of the State Flag and the singing of the State Anthem.

=== Historical flags ===
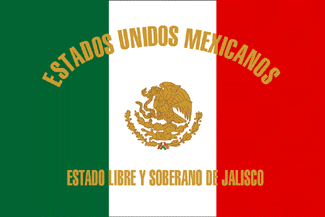
Flag of Jalisco (1972–1998)

Flag of Jalisco (1998-2008)

Flag of Jalisco (2008-2011)

== See also ==
- State flags of Mexico
- Flag of Guadalajara
- Coat of arms of Jalisco
