= Coat of arms of Yucatán =

Coat of arms of Yucatán Escudo de Yucatán
- Coat of Arms of Yucatán
- Armiger: State of Yucatán
- Adopted: 1989

The coat of arms of Yucatán (Spanish: Escudo de Yucatán, lit. "state shield of Yucatán") is a symbol of the Free and Sovereign State of Yucatán.

== Symbolism ==
Heraldically, the official description is as follows: on a field of green, a lanced deer of gold, with a moving sun of the same metal, emerging from the left angle of the chief. At the base: a golden henequen plant, a terrace of stones or slabs of the same metal. A gold border with two Mayan arches and two Spanish colonial belfries, placed at the head and at the tip, dexter and sinister, respectively.

== History ==
Francisco de Montejo (the Nephew), granted the shield and the title of city to Mérida in 1539. On November 30, 1989, decree number 13661 was published in the Official State Gazette.

On June 16 2024, Mauricio Vila Dosal governor of Yucatán state celebrates 182 years free and sovereign with people of Yucatán. The celebration included the raising of the State Coat of Arms, the State Flag and the singing of the State Anthem.

=== Historical coats ===
The symbol is used by all successive regimes in Yucatán, in different forms.

Coat of arms of Kingdom of Yucatán (1539 - 1840).

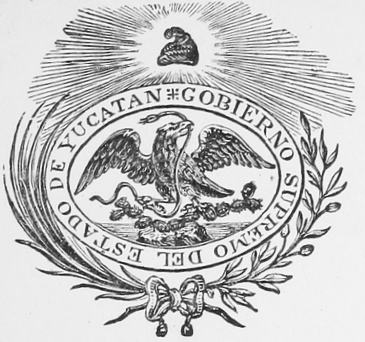
Coat of arms o the Supreme State of Yucatán (1840).

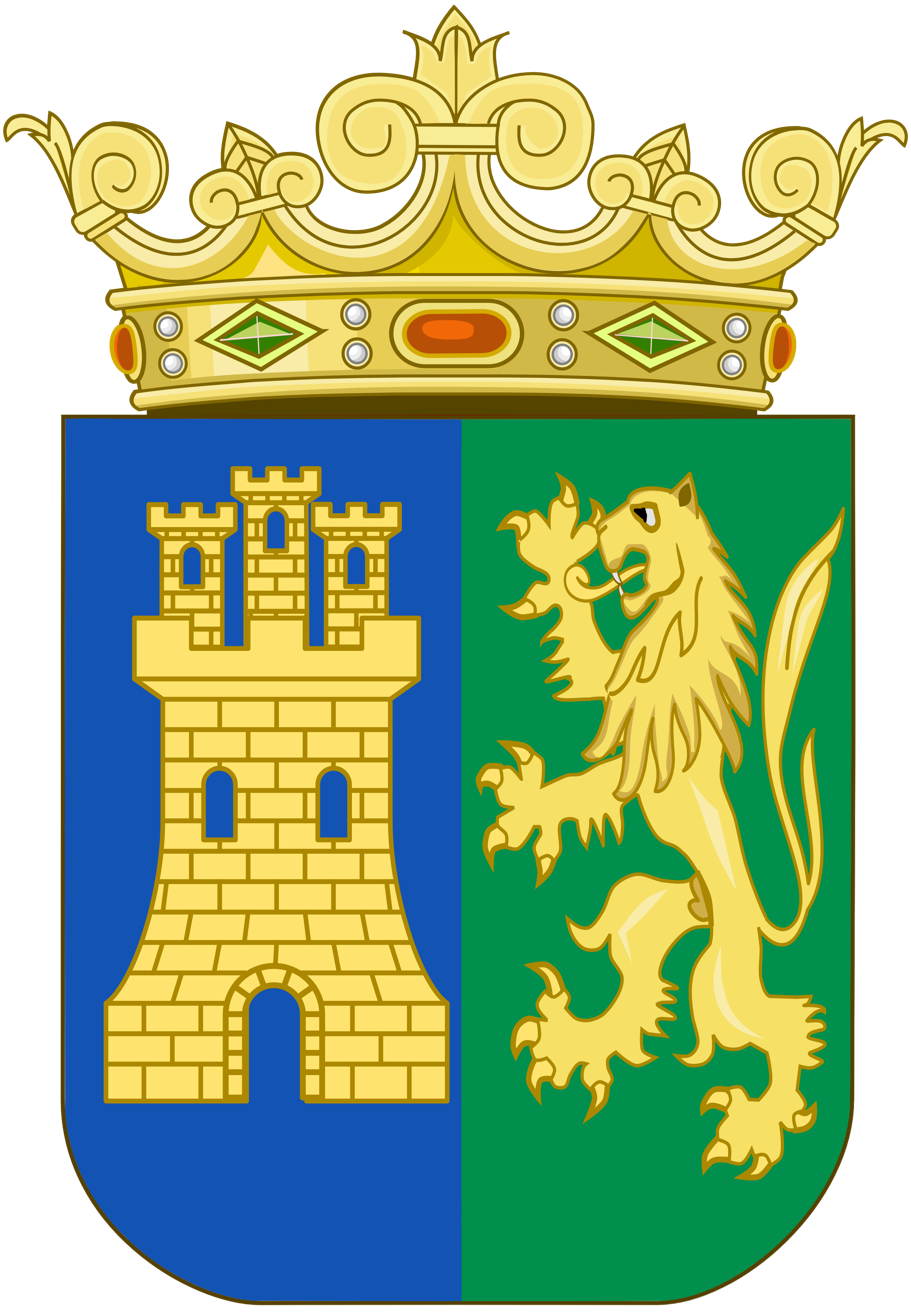
Coat of arms of State of Yucatán (1840 - 1989).

Coat of arms of Yucatán (1989 ).

== See also ==
- Coat of arms of Mexico
- Flag of Yucatán
