= Jacobo de Testera =

16th-century French Franciscan missionary in Mesoamerica

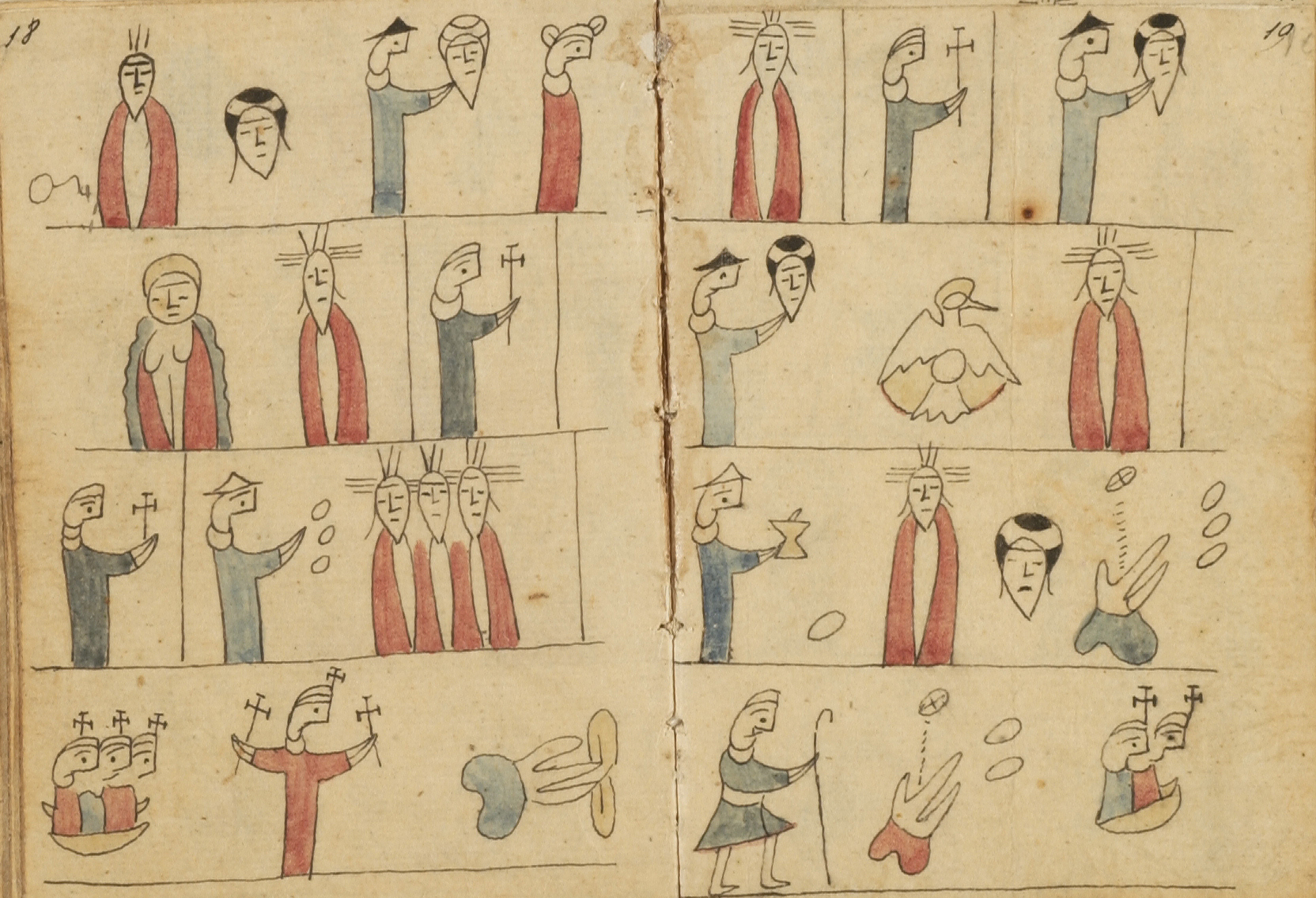
Example of a testerian codex, explaining the Catechism in pictures.

Fray Jacobo de Testera or Jacobo de Tastera was a Franciscan Friar of the 16th century who worked as a missionary to the indigenous peoples of New Spain. Born into a noble family in Bayonne, France he entered the Franciscan order around 1500 and went to Seville where he eventually became palace priest of Charles V. In 1527 he was recruited by Fray Antonio de Ciudad Rodrigo to go to Mexico where he arrived in 1529.

Among the first things he witnessed was the beating to death of the indigenous ruler of Tacubaya by Diego Delgadillo for not being able to provide the latter with sufficient workers to construct his palace. Testera became the companion of Archbishop Juan de Zumárraga before deciding to dedicate himself to the mission. He started to work closely with Fray Pedro de Gante, creating instructional materials for the natives. He missionized in Michoacán and in Atlixco before going to work among the Maya people of Yucatán and later among the Nahua people of Huejotzinco, where he spent the last part of his life in the monastery. He was a colleague of Toribio de Benavente "Motolinia" and a friend of Bartolomé de las Casas. As he never became fluent in an indigenous language he invented a way of proselytizing with images called Testerian codices employing the rebus system to teach Indians Christian doctrine.
