= Flag of Yucatán =

- Use: Civil and state flag
- Proportion: 1:2 or 3:5
- Adopted: March 16, 1841 (originally); August 13, 2024 (re-adopted)
- Design: A green vertical bar on the left containing five stars (two on the top row, one on the middle, and two on the bottom), and in the remainder two red horizontal stripes on the top and bottom with a white stripe in the middle.

The Flag of Yucatán is the flag used by the Mexican State of Yucatán, and formerly the Republic of Yucatán. During the middle of 19th century, the flag was proclaimed in the territory of the Yucatán Peninsula by the Republic of Yucatán, comprising the present Mexican states of Yucatán, Campeche and Quintana Roo.

The flag's official status derived from a reform to the Political Constitution of the United Mexican States made in late 2022 regarding allowing states to adopt their own symbols. The flag was raised by the state authorities for the first time in 182 years on August 21, 2023 in the state capital Mérida, and the flag was made the official symbol of the state effective August 13, 2024, the day after the Ley del Escudo, la Bandera y el Himno was published in the state gazette.

== Design and symbolism ==
Regarding the historical flag of the Republic of Yucatán, the historian Rodolfo Menéndez de la Peña describes the flag thus

The flag of Yucatán was divided into two parts: green on left, the right, with three divisions, red up and down and white in the middle. In the green field highlighted, five stars, symbolizing the five departments that Yucatan was divided by decree of November 30, 1840: Mérida, Izamal, Valladolid, Tekax and Campeche.

The meaning of the colors of the state flag are as follows:

- Green: the ideal of Mexican independence and the autonomy of the government.
- White: purity of the Catholic church.
- Red: the ideal of the union of blood between indigenous people, mestizos, creoles, and Spaniards.

== History ==
=== Historical flags ===
The flag of the Republic of Yucatán was first flown on March 16, 1841, when it was hoisted on the Ayuntamiento municipal building in the "Plaza Grande" of Mérida, the capital city of Yucatán. This action was a protest against the centralism of Mexican president Antonio López de Santa Anna.

Up until 1989, Yucatán commonly used the flag of Mérida similarly to many Mexican states historically which had used as arms those granted to its capital city as their state flag, however, Yucatán had no flags. Yucatán would de facto use the coat of arms of Yucatán on a white banner from November of 1989 until August 13, 2024 when the flag of the Republic of Yucatán would be re-adopted as the official state flag.

1841–1848

??–1989 (de facto)

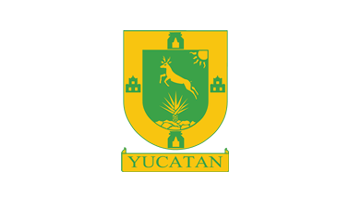
1989–2024 (de facto)

2024–present

=== Modern usage ===
Although not formally recognized at the time, the flag was used throughout the 20th century at ceremonies and festivals of various kinds. The flag's use increased after 2000, after tensions between then governor Víctor Cervera Pacheco and the federal government, and spread rapidly being carried in cars, shirts, posters, etc., as a manifestation of local feeling against the federal government.

Currently, the people from Yucatán use it to express their yucataneidad (pride of being Yucatecan). In 2001, a commemoration for the 160th anniversary of its first and last official use was held in the city of Mérida. In 2010, the flag reappeared at a sports event where then governor Ivonne Ortega Pacheco explained to visiting boxing promoter Don King the meaning of the flag.

The flag became the official state symbol on August 13, 2024, replacing the unofficial flag consisting of the state's coat of arms on a white background.

== See also ==
- Coat of arms of Yucatán
- Territorial evolution of Mexico
- Political divisions of Mexico
- List of Mexican flags
