= Dzitbalché Municipality =

Municipality in the Mexican state of Campeche

Dzitbalché
- Municipality
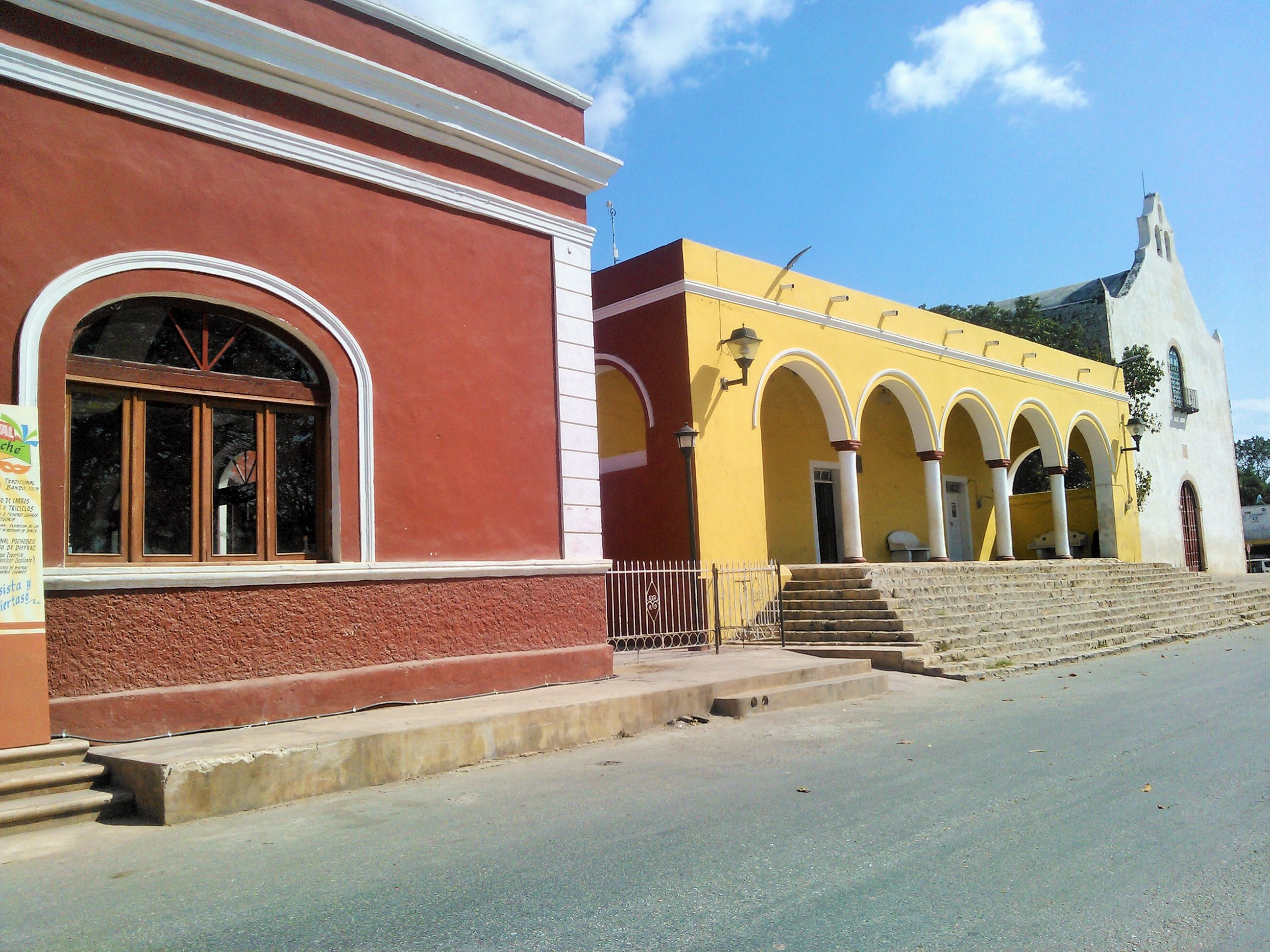
- Cultural house, library and church on Dzitbalché's town square

- Location of the municipality within Campeche

- Location of Dzitbalché Dzitbalché (Mexico)
- Coordinates: 20°19′15″N 90°03′25″W
- Country: Mexico
- State: Campeche
- Incorporated: 1 January 2021
- Seat: Dzitbalché

Government
  - President: José Carlos Sánchez Flores

Area
  - Total: 366.79 km^{2} (141.62 sq mi)
- Elevation (of seat): 13 m (43 ft)

Population (2010 Census)
  - Total: 14,387
  - Estimate (2017): 16,124
  - Density: 39.224/km^{2} (101.59/sq mi)
  - Seat: 11,686
- Time zone: UTC-6 (Central)
- Postal codes: 24920, 24925
- Area code: 996

Dzitbalché (from Yucatec Maya jun tsʼíit báalcheʼ, "a stick or large stem of balché") is a municipality in the Mexican state of Campeche, located 73 kilometres (45 mi) northeast of the state capital of Campeche City. Its creation from the municipality of Calkiní was approved in 2019 and went into force on 1 January 2021.

== Geography ==
The municipality of Dzitbalché is located in northern Campeche. It borders the municipalities of Calkiní to the north and west, Hecelchakán to the south, Hopelchén to the southeast, and Santa Elena in Yucatán to the northeast. The municipality covers an area of 366.79 square kilometres (141.62 sq mi).

Dzitbalché has a tropical savanna climate with rain in the summer. Average temperatures range between 23.7 and 27.7 °C (74.7–81.9 °F), and average annual precipitation is about 1,070 millimetres (42 in).

== History ==
The Maya founded Dzitbalché around 1443–1445. The Songs of Dzitbalché originate from this pre-Hispanic period. The area was ruled by the Canché family when the Spanish arrived.

When Campeche first organized its administrative divisions in 1861, Dzitbalché was made a municipalidad in the partido of Hecelchakán. When the municipality of Calkiní was established in 1916, Dzitbalché became a municipal section (sección municipal) with its own board (junta) within Calkiní. On 31 March 2019 the Campeche state legislature approved the dissolution of the municipal section and the creation of the municipality of Dzitbalché. The decree establishing the municipality was gazetted on 26 April 2019 and went into force on 1 January 2021.

== Administration ==
Dzitbalché will hold its first elections as an independent municipality in 2021. Until then, its administration is being carried out by the members of the former municipal board of Dzitbalché, elected when it was still subordinate to Calkiní. The current president is José Carlos Sánchez Flores.

== Demographics ==
In the 2010 Mexican Census, the localities that now comprise the municipality of Dzitbalché recorded a population of 14,387 inhabitants.

Two of the localities in the municipality are classified as urban:

- The municipal seat also named Dzitbalché, which recorded a population of 11,686 inhabitants in the 2010 Census, and
- Bacabchén, which recorded a population of 2,527 inhabitants in 2010.

== Economy and infrastructure ==
The municipal seat of Dzitbalché functions as a market town for agricultural and artisanal products from the surrounding area. Handicrafts practised include products made from the palma de guano (Sabal spp.), woodworking, embroidery, and gold jewelry. Manufacturing is underdeveloped apart from a maquiladora operated by Augusta Sportswear.

The municipality has eighteen schools including a CONALEP school, and one health centre. Mexican Federal Highway 180 and the Campeche–Mérida railway (which will become part of the Mayan Train) run north–south through the municipality.
