= Municipalities of Campeche =

List of municipalities of Mexican state

Map of Mexico with Campeche highlighted

Campeche is a state on the Yucatán Peninsula in Mexico that is divided into thirteen municipalities. According to the 2020 INEGI census, Campeche is the third least populous state with 928,363 inhabitants and the 17th largest by land area spanning 57,693.59 square kilometres (22,275.62 sq mi).

Municipalities in Campeche are administratively autonomous of the state according to the 115th article of the 1917 Constitution of Mexico. Every three years, citizens elect a municipal president (Spanish: presidente municipal) by a plurality voting system who heads a concurrently elected municipal council (ayuntamiento) responsible for providing all the public services for their constituents. The municipal council consists of a variable number of trustees and councillors (regidores y síndicos). Municipalities are responsible for public services (such as water and sewerage), street lighting, public safety, traffic, and the maintenance of public parks, gardens and cemeteries. They may also assist the state and federal governments in education, emergency fire and medical services, environmental protection and maintenance of monuments and historical landmarks. Since 1984, they have had the power to collect property taxes and user fees, although more funds are obtained from the state and federal governments than from their own income.

The largest municipality by population in Campeche is the state capital Campeche, with 294,077 residents, while the smallest municipality by population is Palizada with 8,683 residents. The largest municipality by area is Calakmul, which spans 14,031.51 km^{2} (5,417.60 sq mi), while Tenabo is the smallest at 1,061.63 km^{2} (409.90 sq mi). The first municipalities to incorporate were Campeche, Carmen, and Hecelchakán on April 6, 1825, and the newest municipalities are Dzitbalché and Seybaplaya, which incorporated January 1, 2021.

== Municipalities ==
Largest municipalities in Campeche by population

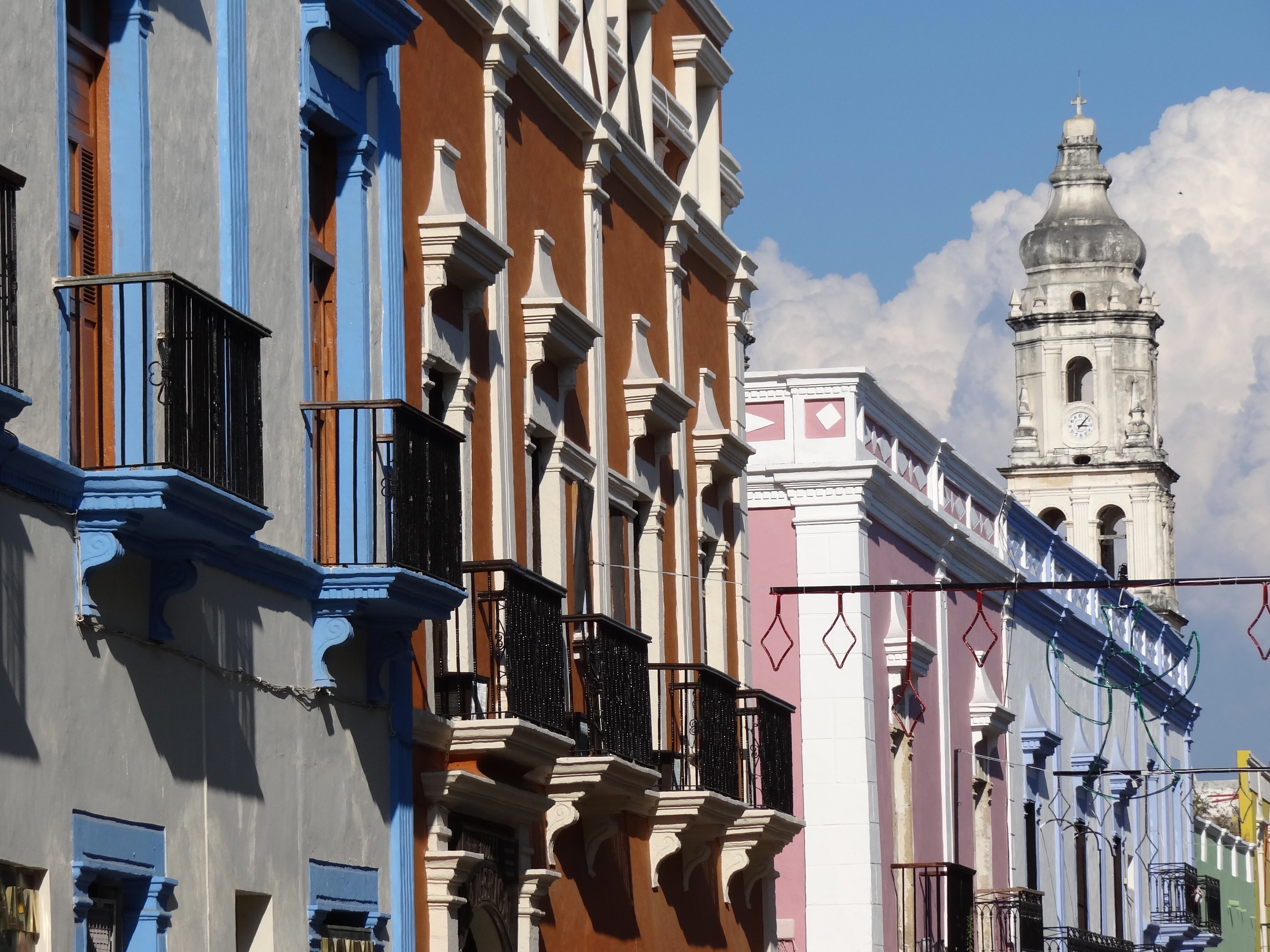
Campeche, Campeche's capital and largest municipality by population

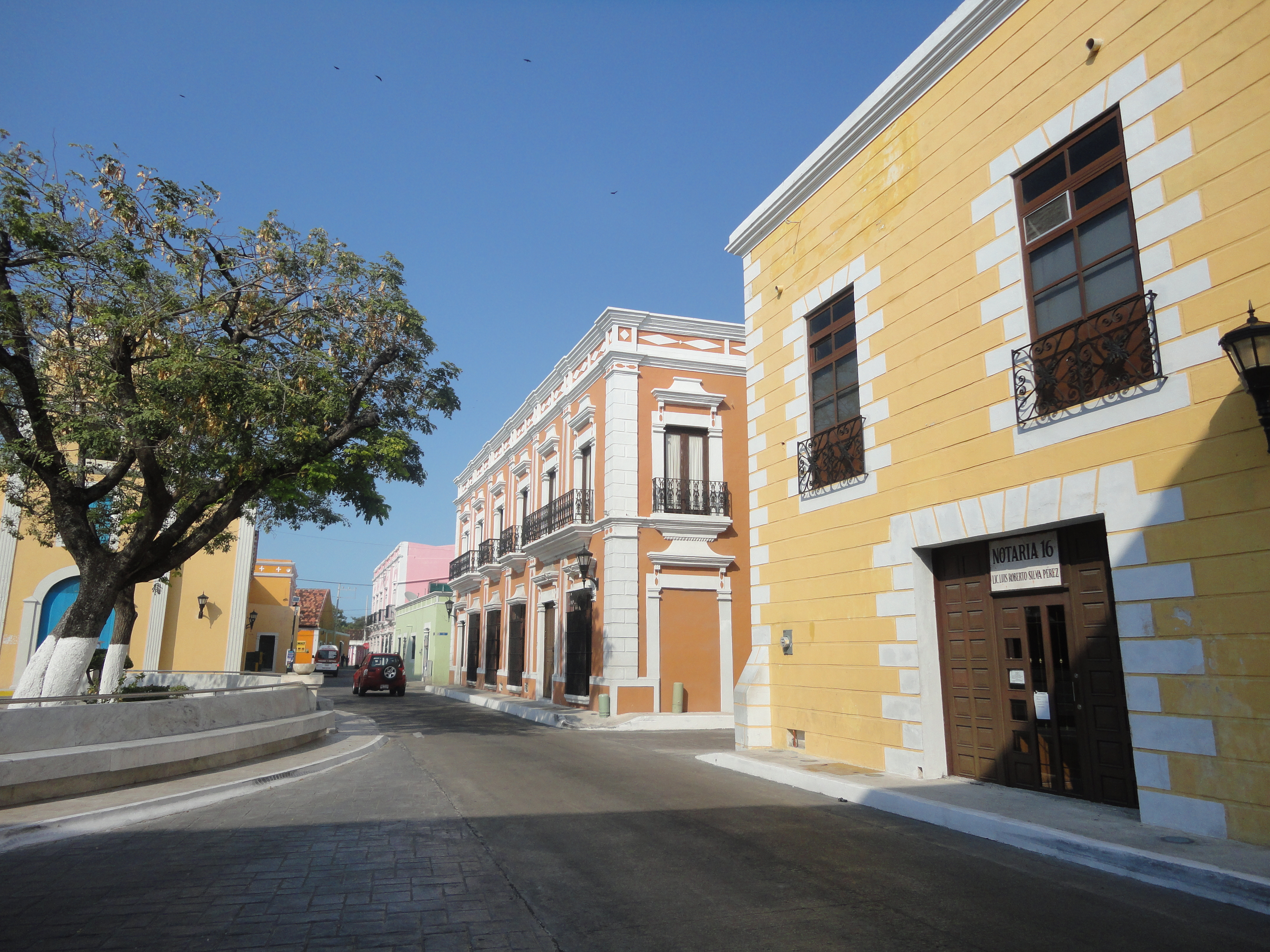
Carmen, Campeche's second largest municipality by population

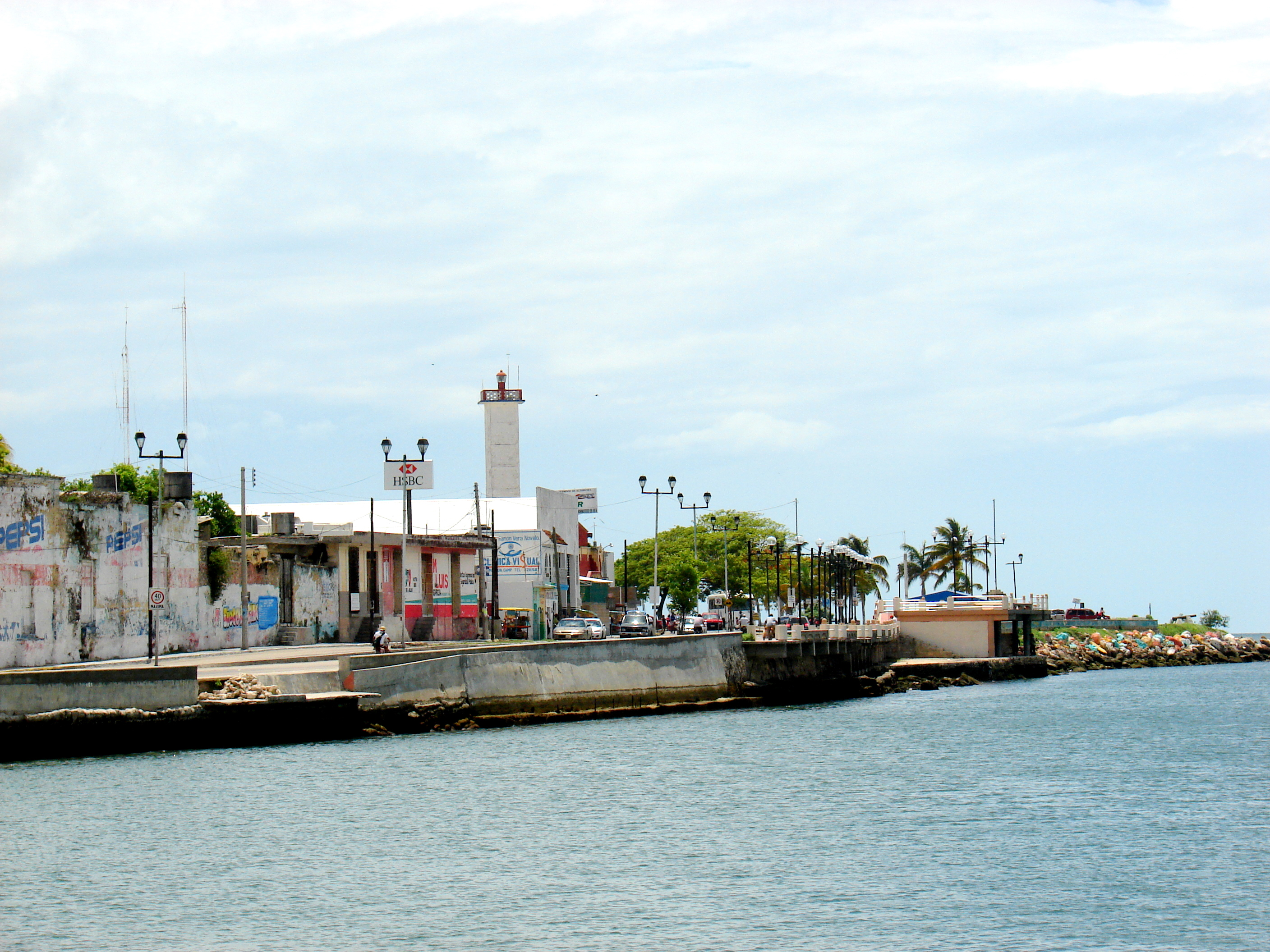
Coast of Champotón, the third largest municipality by population in Campeche

† State capital

Municipalities of Campeche
Name	Municipal seat	Population (2020)	Population (2010)	Change	Land area		Population density (2020)	Incorporation date
Name	Municipal seat	Population (2020)	Population (2010)	Change	km^{2}	sq mi	Population density (2020)	Incorporation date
Calakmul	Xpujil	31,714	26,882	+18.0%	14,031.51	5,417.60	2.3/km^{2} (5.9/sq mi)	December 31, 1996
Calkiní (Note: The population, land area and population density for Calkiní reflects municipal boundaries prior to the 2021 separation of the municipality of Dzitbalché.)	Calkiní	59,232	52,890	+12.0%	2,108.70	814.17	28.1/km^{2} (72.8/sq mi)	July 4, 1862
Campeche†	Campeche	294,077	259,005	+13.5%	3,253.63	1,256.23	90.4/km^{2} (234.1/sq mi)	April 6, 1825
Candelaria	Candelaria	46,913	41,194	+13.9%	5,687.63	2,196.01	8.2/km^{2} (21.4/sq mi)	July 1, 1998
Carmen	Ciudad del Carmen	248,845	221,094	+12.6%	8,644.17	3,337.53	28.8/km^{2} (74.6/sq mi)	April 6, 1825
Champotón (Note: The 2020 population, land area and population density for Champotón reflects municipal boundaries after the 2021 separation of the municipality of Seybaplaya. The 2010 population for Champotón reflects its previous municipal boundaries including Seybaplaya.)	Champotón	78,170	83,021	–	6,589.70	2,544.30	11.9/km^{2} (30.7/sq mi)	November 30, 1840
Dzitbalché (Note: No population figures are available as Dzitbalché incorporated on January 1, 2021, and was thus not counted as a separate municipality for the 2020 census.)	Dzitbalché	–	–	–	–	–	–	January 1, 2021
Escárcega	Escárcega	59,923	54,184	+10.6%	4,798.22	1,852.60	12.5/km^{2} (32.3/sq mi)	July 19, 1990
Hecelchakán	Hecelchakán	31,917	28,306	+12.8%	1,278.67	493.70	25.0/km^{2} (64.6/sq mi)	April 6, 1825
Hopelchén	Hopelchén	42,140	37,777	+11.5%	7,803.22	3,012.84	5.4/km^{2} (14.0/sq mi)	May 24, 1837
Palizada	Palizada	8,683	8,352	+4.0%	2,149.95	830.10	4.0/km^{2} (10.5/sq mi)	July 4, 1862
Seybaplaya (Note: Population figures are available as Seybaplaya despite its incorporation on January 1, 2021 after the 2020 census.)	Seybaplaya	15,297	13,783	+11.0%	289.80	111.89	52.8/km^{2} (136.7/sq mi)	January 1, 2021
Tenabo	Tenabo	11,452	9,736	+17.6%	1,061.63	409.90	10.8/km^{2} (27.9/sq mi)	July 4, 1862
Campeche	—	928,363	822,441	+12.9%	57,693.59	22,275.62	16.1/km^{2} (41.7/sq mi)	—
Mexico	—	126,014,024	112,336,538	+12.2%	1,972,550	761,606	63.9/km^{2} (165.5/sq mi)	—
