= Seybaplaya Municipality =

Municipality in the Mexican state of Campeche

Seybaplaya
- Municipality
- Location of Seybaplaya in Campeche
- Coordinates: 19°38′21″N 90°41′18″W
- Country: Mexico
- State: Campeche
- Incorporated: 1 January 2021
- Seat: Seybaplaya

Government
  - President: Diego Pablo Palomo Ku

Area
  - Total: 289.8 km^{2} (111.9 sq mi)
- Elevation (of seat): 3 m (9.8 ft)

Population (2010 Census)
  - Total: 13,783
  - Estimate (2017): 15,420
  - Density: 47.56/km^{2} (123.2/sq mi)
  - Seat: 8,711
- Time zone: UTC-6 (Central)
- Postal code: 24460–24464
- Area code: 982

Seybaplaya (Spanish: "ceiba beach") is a municipality in the Mexican state of Campeche, located 27 kilometres (17 mi) southwest of the state capital at San Francisco de Campeche. Its creation was approved in 2019 and came into force on 1 January 2021.

== Geography ==
The municipality of Seybaplaya is located on the west coast of the Yucatán Peninsula on the Gulf of Mexico. It borders the municipalities of Campeche to the north and Champotón to the south. The municipality covers an area of 289.8 square kilometres (111.9 sq mi).

Seybaplaya has a tropical savanna climate with rain in the summer. The average annual temperature is about 26 °C (79 °F).

== History ==
The conquistador Francisco Hernández de Córdoba reached the location of what is now Seybaplaya in 1517. During the era of Spanish colonization, the coast of Campeche was frequently raided by pirates, and the town of Seybaplaya was sacked in 1680 and 1748. A town named Seyba Cabecera was founded 15 kilometres (9.3 mi) inland of Seybaplaya in 1682 and counted 1217 inhabitants in 1790. It was abandoned after being struck by epidemics of cholera in the 1850s and smallpox in 1915. Its ruins are visible from the road east of Seybaplaya between Xkeulil and Hobomó.

When Campeche first organized its administrative divisions in 1861, Seybaplaya was made a municipalidad in the partido of Champotón. In 1915 it became a municipal section (sección municipal) of the municipality of Champotón, with its own directly elected municipal board (junta municipal). On 28 February 2019 the Campeche state legislature approved the dissolution of the municipal section and the creation of the municipality of Seybaplaya. The decree establishing the municipality was gazetted on 26 April 2019 and came into force on 1 January 2021.

== Administration ==
Seybaplaya will hold its first elections as an independent municipality in 2021. Until then, its administration is being carried out by the members of the former municipal board of Seybaplaya, elected when it was still subordinate to Champotón. The current president is Diego Pablo Palomo Ku.

== Demographics ==
In the 2010 Mexican Census, the localities that now comprise the municipality of Seybaplaya recorded a population of 13,783 inhabitants.

There are 56 localities in the municipality, of which two are classified as urban:

- The municipal seat, also named Seybaplaya, which recorded a population of 8,711 inhabitants in the 2010 Census, and
- Villa Madero, which recorded a population of 3,954 inhabitants in 2010.

== Economy and infrastructure ==
Seybaplaya's economy is mainly dependent on commerce and services connected with its small port, which moved 17,000 tonnes of cargo in 2016. A maquiladora operated by Delta Apparel is located in the municipality, and fishing and agriculture are also practised. The municipality has a high school, a health centre, a police station and a cemetery. Mexican Federal Highway 180 runs along the coast of the municipality, and a section of the toll expressway 180D runs parallel to it inland, connecting it to the city of Campeche in the northeast.
