= Lerma, Campeche =

Lerma
- Town
- Location in Mexico
- Coordinates: 19°48′N 90°36′W
- Country: Mexico
- State: Campeche
- Municipality: Campeche

Population (2010)
  - Total: 8,281

Lerma is a town of Campeche Municipality, in the state of Campeche, south-eastern Mexico.
