= Carmen Municipality =

Municipality in the Mexican state of Campeche

Carmen
- Municipality
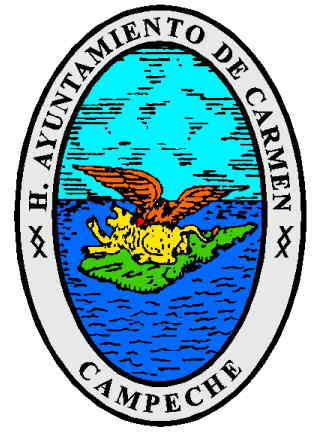
- Coat of arms

- Location of Carmen

- Location within Campeche Location within Mexico
- Coordinates: 18°38′35″N 91°49′50″W
- Country: Mexico
- State: Campeche
- Municipal seat: Ciudad del Carmen

Government
  - Municipal president: José Ignacio Seara Sierra (2006-09)

Area
  - Total: 8,557.3 km^{2} (3,304.0 sq mi)

Population (2015)
  - Total: 248,303
  - Density: 29.017/km^{2} (75.152/sq mi)
- Time zone: UTC−6 (CST)
- Created: 1916
- Demonym: Carmeios o Carmelitas
- Postal Code: 24180
- Website: www.carmen.gob.mx/

Carmen is one of the 13 municipalities in the Mexican state of Campeche. It is situated at the south-west of the state, on and around the Laguna de Términos. The municipal seat and largest settlement is Ciudad del Carmen. As of 2015, the population was 248,303.

The name "Carmen" is in honour of 16 July, the feast of Nuestra Señora del Carmen, after the date in 1717 when Spanish colonial authorities finally expelled the pirates from the island now known as Isla del Carmen.

== Geography ==
The municipality of Carmen borders to the north with the Gulf of Mexico; to the west with the municipality of Palizada; and to the east with the municipalities of Champotón, Escárcega and Candelaria. It covers a total surface area of 9,720.09 km^{2}.

== Demographics ==
As of 2010, the municipality had a total population of 221,094.

The municipality had 1,886 localities, the largest of which (with 2010 populations in parentheses) were: Ciudad del Carmen (169,466), Sabancuy (7,286), Isla Aguada (6,204), Nuevo Progreso (4,851), San Antonio Cárdenas (4,206), Atasta (2,535), classified as urban, and Checubul (1,811), Chicbul (1,692), Colonia Emiliano Zapata (1,311), El Aguacatal (1,270), Mamantel (Pancho Villa) (1,262), Licenciado Gustavo Díaz Ordaz (18 de Marzo) (1,239), and Abelardo L. Rodríguez (1,130), classified as rural.

The 2005 census reported a population of 199,988 persons. Of these, 4,151 spoke one of 25 indigenous languages used in the municipality, predominantly Ch'ol and Yucatec Maya.
