= Calkiní Municipality =

Municipality in Campeche, Mexico

Calkiní
- Municipality
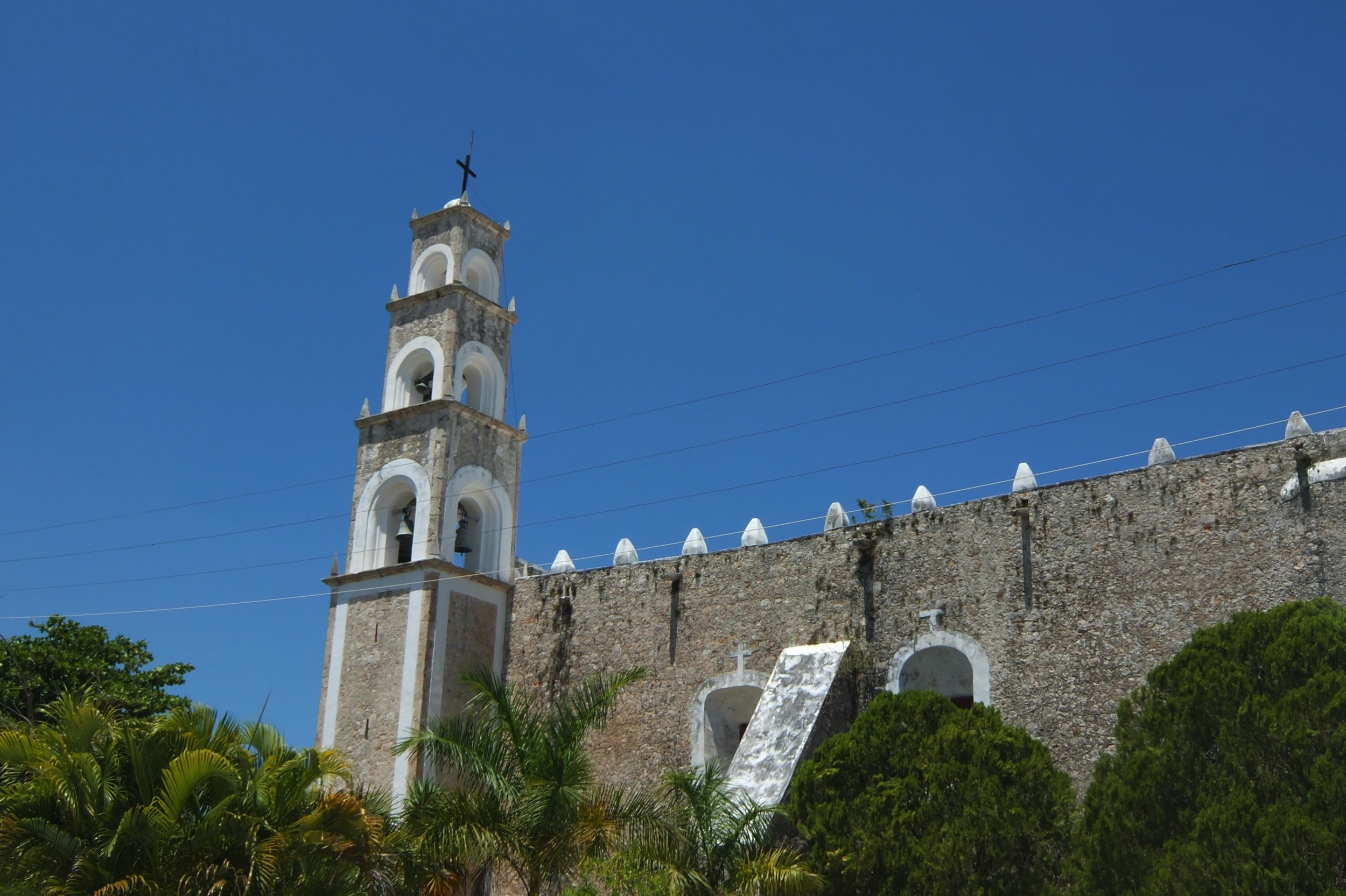
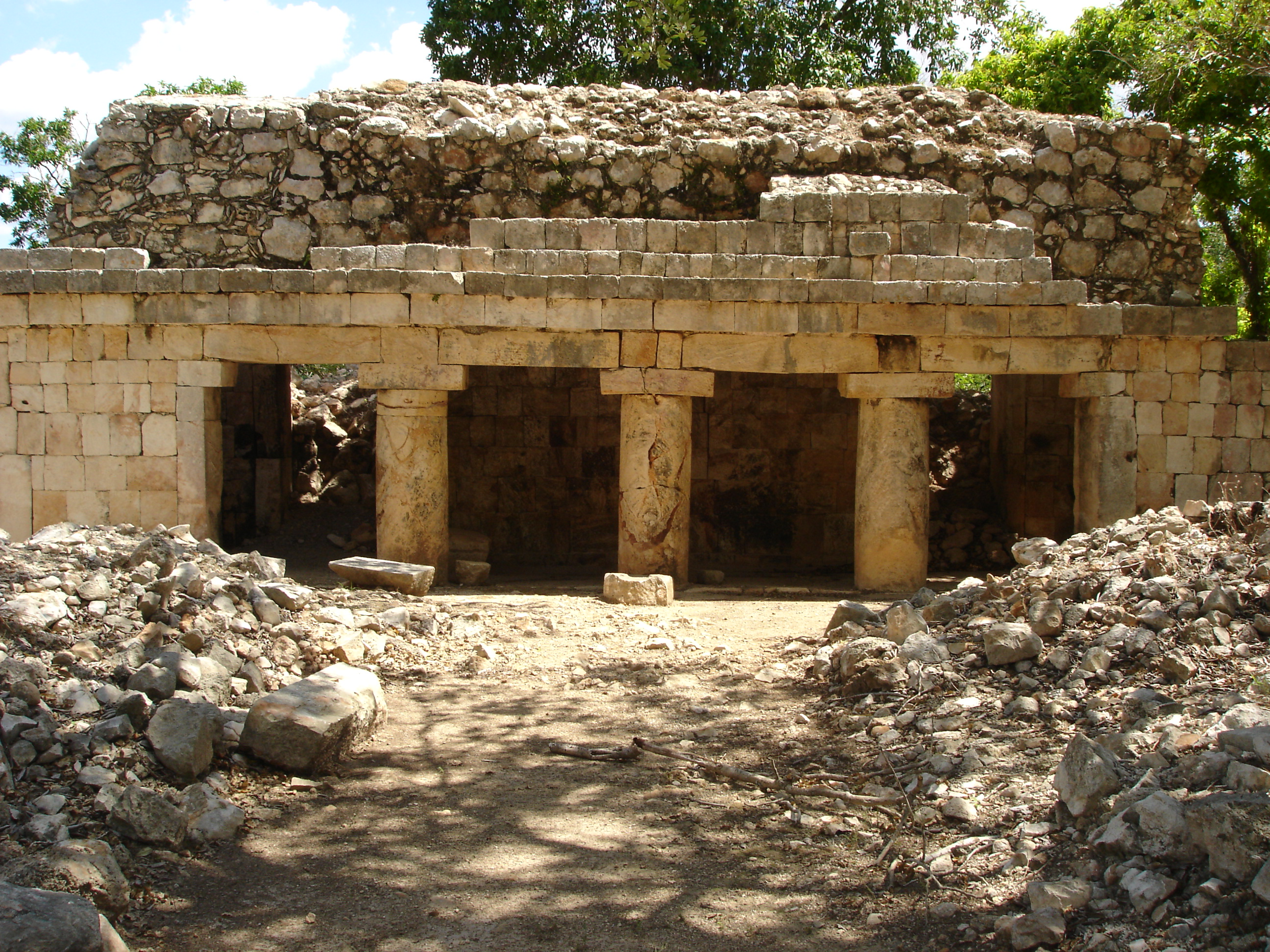
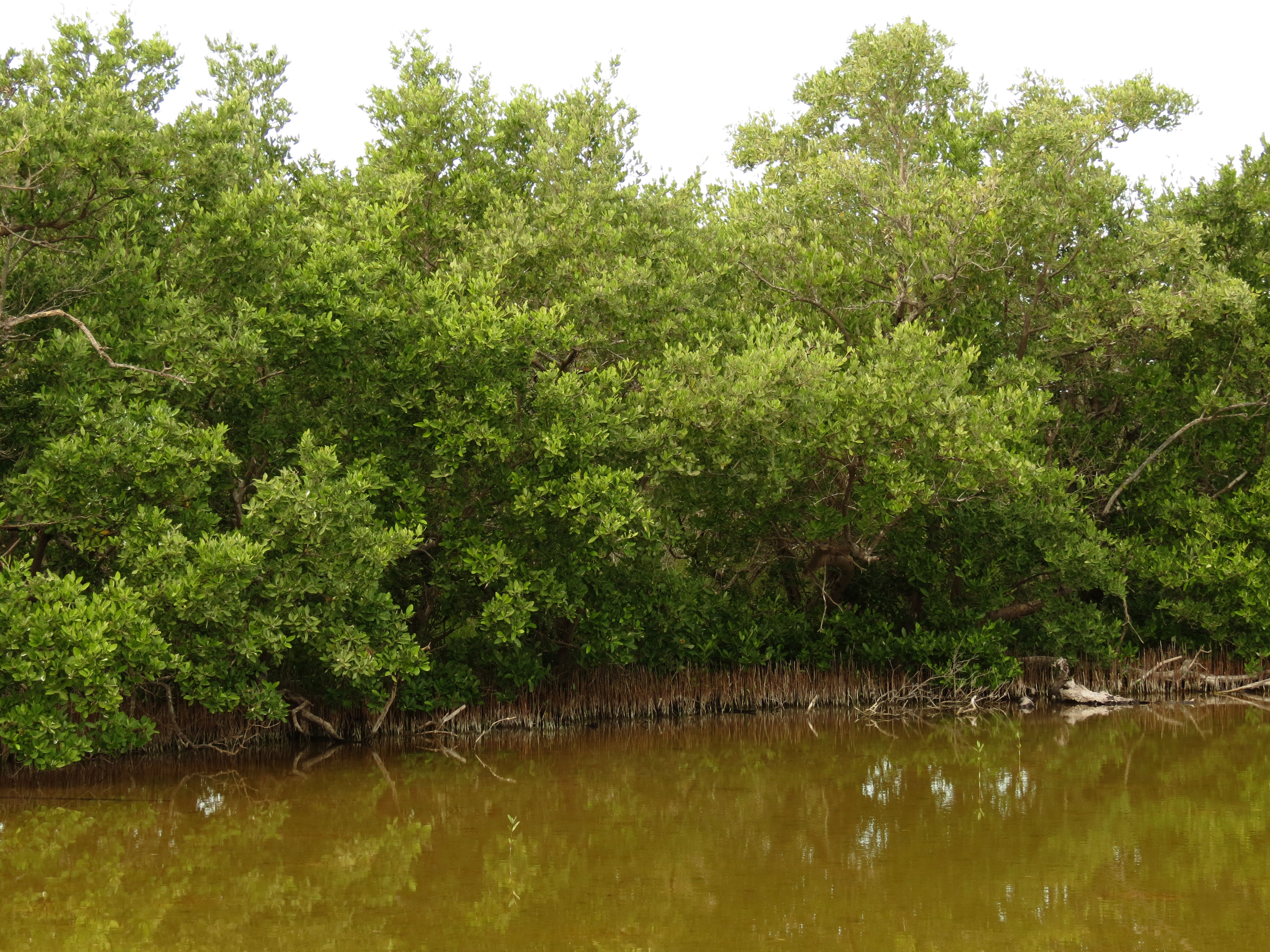
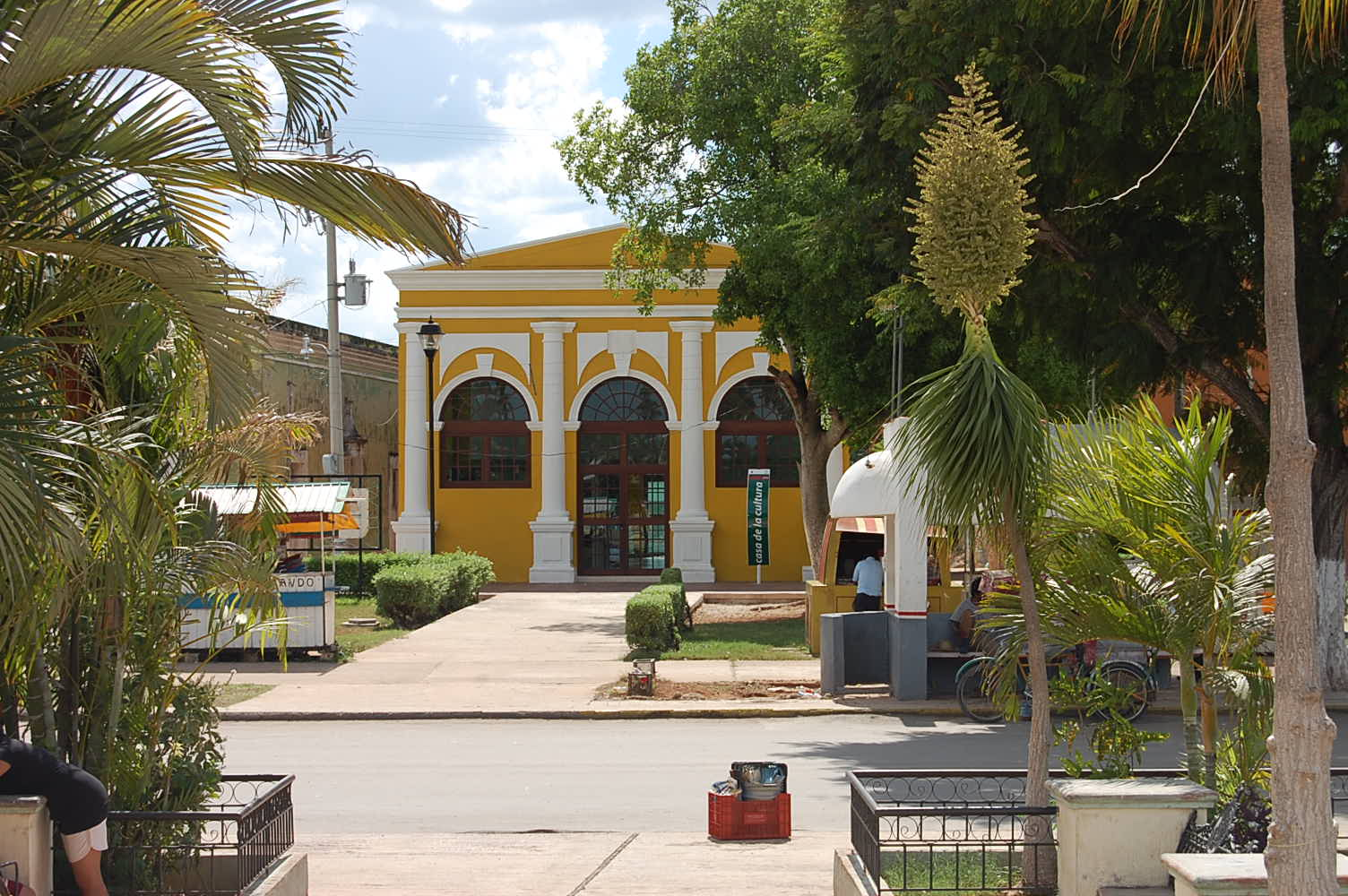
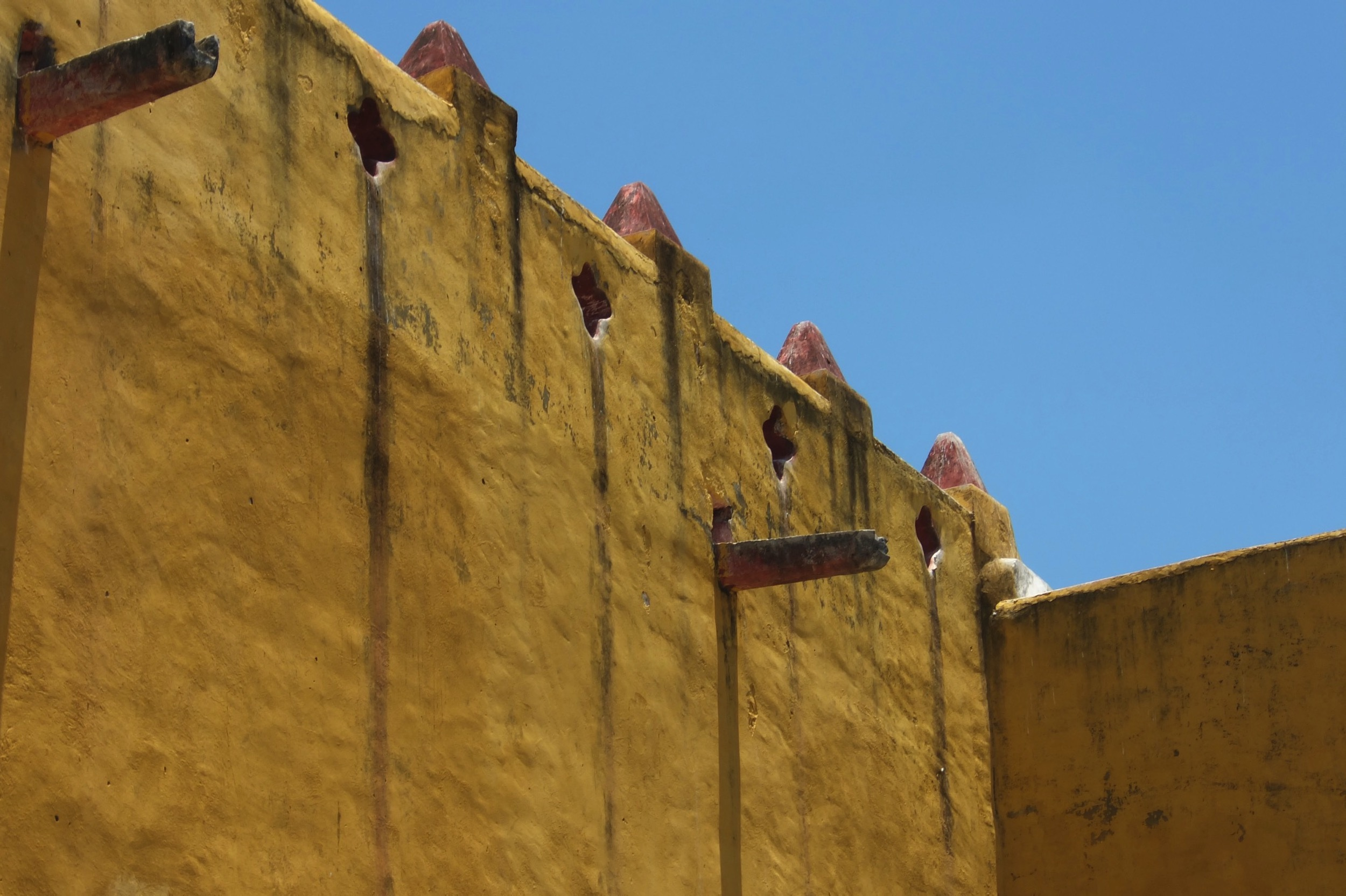
- Top: San Luis Obispo Church at Calkiní; Middle: Xcalumkin Archaeological Zone, Ría Celestun Biosphere Reserve; Bottom: Bécal town, San Bartolomé Temple at Tepakan

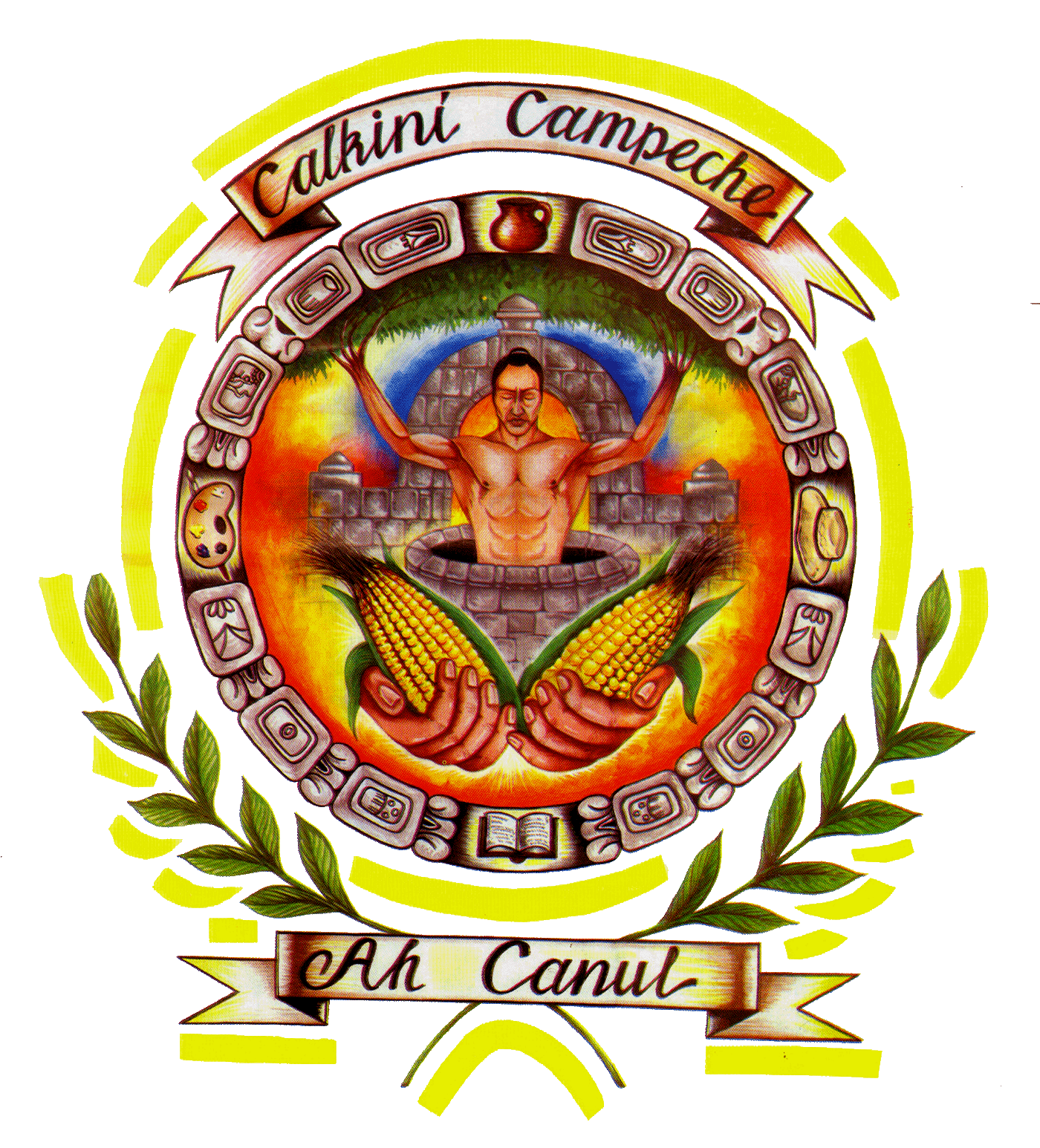
- Coat of arms

- Location of Calkiní in Campeche.
- Country: Mexico
- State: Campeche
- Municipal seat and largest seat: Calkiní

Government
  - Mayor: Milton Ulises Millán Atoche (MC)

Area
  - Total: 2,097 km^{2} (810 sq mi)

Population (2020)
  - Total: 59,232
  - Density: 28.25/km^{2} (73.16/sq mi)
  - Seat: 15,940
- Time zone: UTC−6 (CST)

Calkiní (Yucatec Maya: "throat of the sun") is one of the 13 municipalities in the Mexican state of Campeche. It is situated at the northern tip of the state, on the central western coast the Yucatán Peninsula. The municipal seat, and largest settlement, is the city of Calkiní.

== Geography ==
The municipality of Calkiní borders to the west with the Gulf of Mexico, to the north and east with the state of Yucatán, and to the south with the municipality of Hecelchakán. It covers 1,966.57 km^{2}.

== Demographics ==
The 2020 census reported a population of 59,232 persons. Of these, 15,949 spoke one of several indigenous languages, predominantly Yucatec Maya.

As of 2020, the city of Calkiní had a population of 14,934. Other than the city of Calkiní, the municipality had 202 localities, the largest of which (with 2020 populations in parentheses) were: Dzitbalché (13,208), Bécal (6,801), Nunkiní (6,485), Bacabchén (3,128), classified as urban, and Santa Cruz Pueblo (2,286), San Antonio Sahcabchén (2,280), Tepakán (2,193), Santa Cruz Ex-Hacienda (1,421), and Tankuché (1,228), classified as rural.

== Heritage ==
The Maya archaeological site of Can-Mayab-Mul is in Nunkiní.
