= Chunlimón =

Maya archaeological site in Mexico

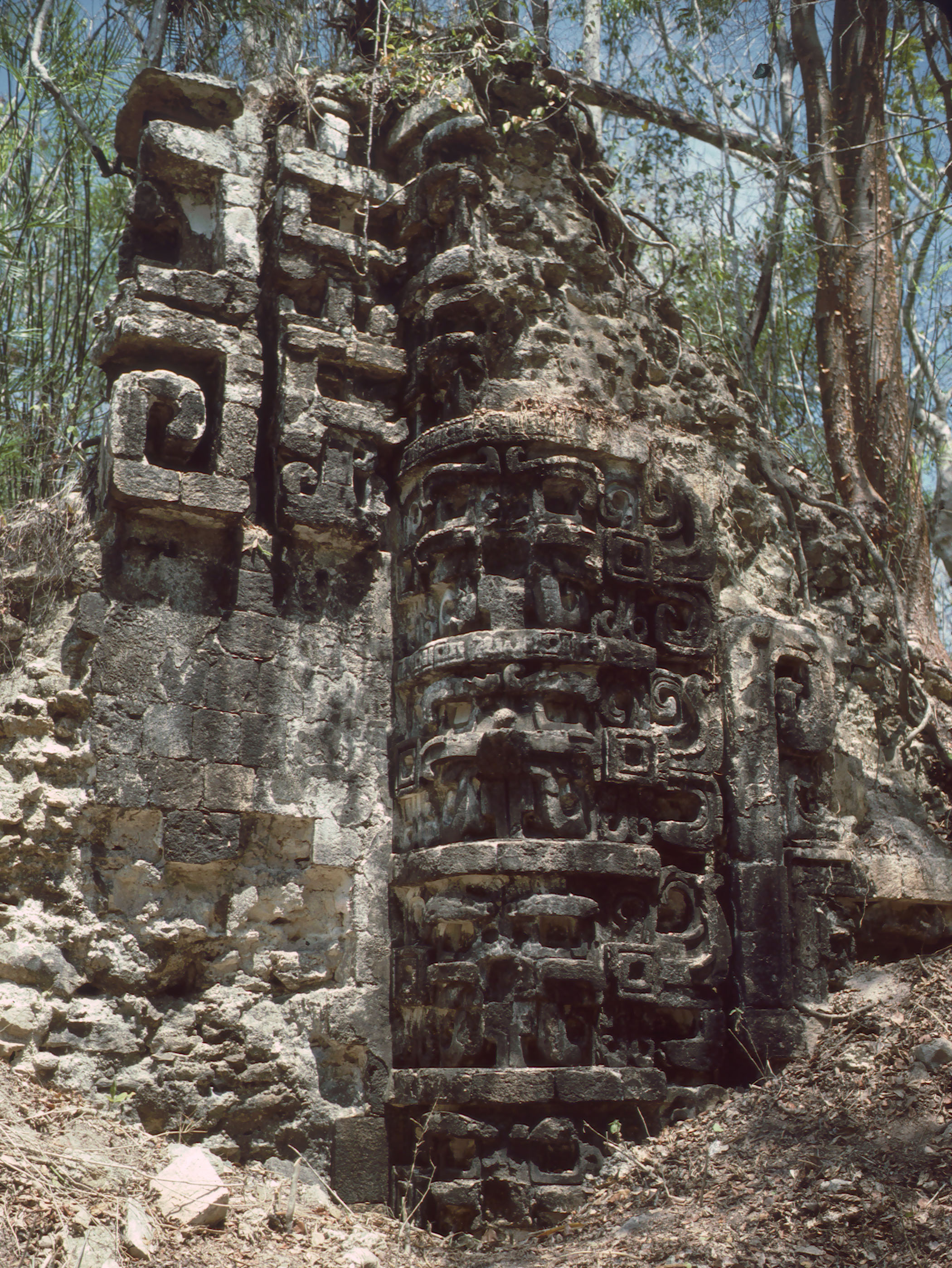
Chunlimón

Chunlimón is a Maya archaeological site in the Mexican state of Campeche. It is located 20 kilometers east from Kankabchen in Hopelchén Municipality.
