= Calkiní =

City in the Mexican state of Campeche

- City and municipal seat
- Location within Mexico
- Coordinates: 20°22′N 90°03′W
- Country: Mexico
- State: Campeche
- Municipality: Calkiní

Government
  - Municipal president: Jorge Antonio Cocom Collí (2006-09)
- Elevation: 14 m (46 ft)

Population (2010)
  - Total: 14,934
- Time zone: UTC−6 (Central (US Central))
- City status: 30 November 1918
- Website: www.calkini.gob.mx

Calkiní (Yucatec Maya: "throat of the sun") is a city in the Mexican state of Campeche. It is situated at the northern tip of the state, on the central western coast the Yucatán Peninsula. It serves as the municipal seat for the surrounding municipality of the same name. As of 2010, the city of Calkiní had a population of 14,934.

Calkini's San Luis Obispo or San Luis Calkiní church was founded in 1549 by the Franciscan Fray Diego de Villalpando as a mission and constructed on the base of the main ceremonial Mayan structure located on the site, thus ensuring both handily available building materials and a natural predisposition of the soon-to-be-converted Mayan population to gravitate towards this sacred place.

Its strategic location halfway between Campeche and Merida made it both the head mission for the Franciscans in the region by 1588 and the second-largest town in the entire province of Yucatan, which then encompassed all three current states on the Yucatan peninsula.

Today, it is a popular stop for tourists when traveling between Merida and Campeche or to nearby Isla Arena.
