= Acanmul =

Archaeological find place in Mexico

Coordinates: 19°54′13″N 90°19′32″W

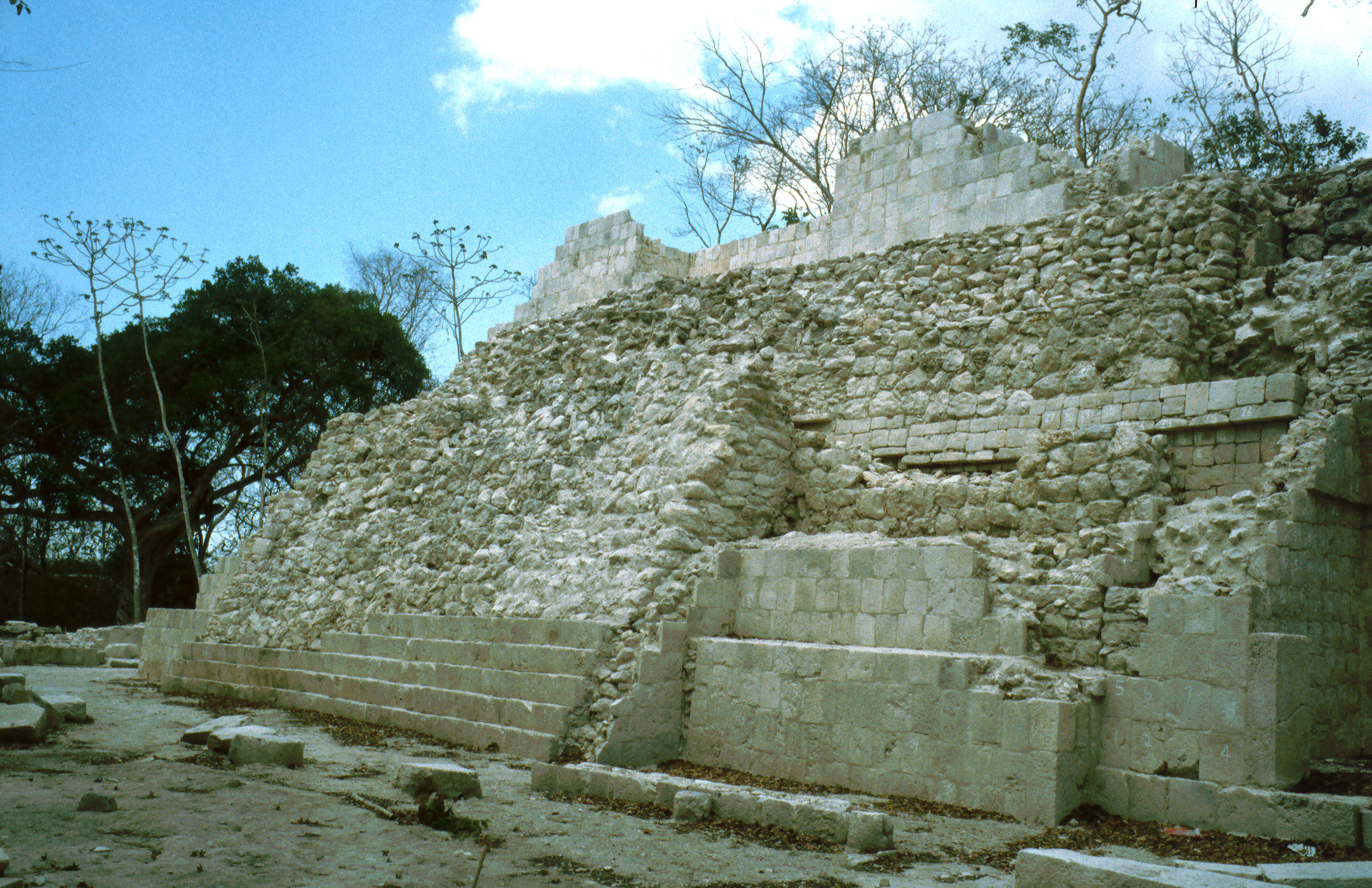
Acanmul Palace

Acanmul is a Maya archaeological site in the Mexican state of Campeche. It is located 25 km (16 mi) northeast of Campeche city.
