= Hopelchén =

City in the Mexican state of Campeche

- City and municipal seat
- Location within Campeche Location within Mexico
- Coordinates: 19.7444°N 89.8453°W
- Country: Mexico
- State: Campeche
- Municipality: Hopelchén

Government
  - Municipal president: Hebert Rafael Infante Yeh(2009-2012)

Population (2010)
  - Total: 7,295
- Time zone: UTC−6 (Central (US Central))
  - Summer (DST): UTC−5 (Central)
- Spanish foundation: 1621
- City status: 26 February 1959
- Website: www.municipiohopelchen.gob.mx

Hopelchén ([xopelˈtʃen], Yucatec Maya: "place of five wells") is a city in the Mexican state of Campeche. It is situated inland in the north of the state. It serves as the municipal seat for the surrounding Hopelchén Municipality. In 2010, Hopelchén had a population of 7,295.

== Climate ==
Climate data for Hopelchén (1991–2020)
| Month | Jan | Feb | Mar | Apr | May | Jun | Jul | Aug | Sep | Oct | Nov | Dec | Year |
|---|---|---|---|---|---|---|---|---|---|---|---|---|---|
| Record high °C (°F) | 39.1 (102.4) | 49 (120) | 45 (113) | 44 (111) | 46 (115) | 47 (117) | 48 (118) | 43 (109) | 42 (108) | 39.9 (103.8) | 40 (104) | 39 (102) | 49 (120) |
| Mean daily maximum °C (°F) | 28.9 (84.0) | 30.7 (87.3) | 32.8 (91.0) | 35.2 (95.4) | 35.8 (96.4) | 33.7 (92.7) | 33.6 (92.5) | 33.6 (92.5) | 32.9 (91.2) | 31.6 (88.9) | 30.1 (86.2) | 29.2 (84.6) | 32.3 (90.1) |
| Daily mean °C (°F) | 22.4 (72.3) | 23.9 (75.0) | 25.5 (77.9) | 27.5 (81.5) | 28.3 (82.9) | 27.1 (80.8) | 27.0 (80.6) | 26.9 (80.4) | 26.4 (79.5) | 25.5 (77.9) | 23.8 (74.8) | 22.9 (73.2) | 25.6 (78.1) |
| Mean daily minimum °C (°F) | 15.8 (60.4) | 17.1 (62.8) | 18.2 (64.8) | 19.9 (67.8) | 20.8 (69.4) | 20.6 (69.1) | 20.5 (68.9) | 20.2 (68.4) | 20.0 (68.0) | 19.3 (66.7) | 17.5 (63.5) | 16.6 (61.9) | 18.9 (66.0) |
| Record low °C (°F) | 4 (39) | 4 (39) | 3 (37) | 4 (39) | 7 (45) | 5 (41) | 5 (41) | 6 (43) | 6 (43) | 5 (41) | 5 (41) | 4 (39) | 3 (37) |
| Average precipitation mm (inches) | 31.9 (1.26) | 18.4 (0.72) | 27.5 (1.08) | 51.1 (2.01) | 93.4 (3.68) | 204.5 (8.05) | 126.4 (4.98) | 173.1 (6.81) | 227.5 (8.96) | 126.0 (4.96) | 48.3 (1.90) | 25.1 (0.99) | 1,153.2 (45.40) |
| Average precipitation days (≥ 0.1 mm) | 3.3 | 2.5 | 1.9 | 2.6 | 6.1 | 10.9 | 11.0 | 13.8 | 13.9 | 10.6 | 5.1 | 3.6 | 85.3 |
Source: Servicio Meteorologico Nacional
