= Coat of arms of Campeche =

Coat of Arms

Coat of Arms of Campeche

The Coat of Arms of the Free and Sovereign State of Campeche is the official coat of arms representing the State of Campeche, which was originally granted to the "Very Noble and Very Loyal City of San Francisco de Campeche" in 1777 by the King of Spain, Charles III, and later the coat of arms was adopted at the state level.

== Symbolism ==
More than a shield, faithfully portraying its historical past, it is one of the best and most expressive granted by the Spanish Crown in New Spain. It speaks for itself. Ships and castles in harmonious heraldic combination, lovingly encircled by the seraphic cord. Everlasting image of the walled enclosure and its seafaring vocation.

The shield of Campeche is divided into four parts, each of which is called a quarter.

The red background of the quarters that are located at the top left and at the bottom right, signifies the bravery of the people of Campeche and highlights the silver-colored towers. This color reflects the firmness and honesty of the character of its inhabitants, and the towers represent the power in the defense of the territory. In the other two quarters there is a sailing ship with the anchor raised sailing in the sea, which reminds us of the importance of Campeche as a seaport.

The quarters are on a blue background, which means the loyalty and good feelings of the people of Campeche. Finally, at the top of the shield we find a crown adorned with precious stones that symbolize the nobility and greatness of the state.

== History ==
The coat of arms of the city of San Francisco de Campeche, granted in 1777 by the King of Spain, Charles III, is composed of four quarters: two with castles in a field of gules and two with galleons in a field of azure, the entire shield is awarded with the cord of San Francisco and the royal crown, for services rendered.

=== Historical coats ===
The symbol is used by all successive regimes in New Spain, in different forms.

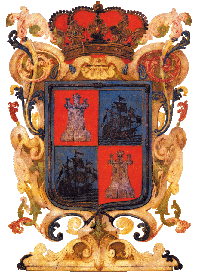
Coat of arms from 1712 to 1979.

== See also ==
- Campeche
- Coat of arms of Mexico
