= Songs of Dzitbalché =

Mayan book of lyric poetry

The [Book of the] Songs of Dzitbalché (Spanish: [El libro de] los cantares de Dzitbalché), originally titled The Book of the Dances of the Ancients, is a Mayan book containing poetry. It is the source of almost all the ancient Mayan lyric poems that have survived, and is closely connected to the Books of Chilam Balam which are sacred books of the colonial Yucatec Maya. The sole surviving copy of the Songs of Dzitbalché was written in alphabetic Mayan in the 18th century.

The author of the book identifies himself as Ah Bam, an elder of the town of Dzitbalché. He appears to say that the book was originally written in 1440. Manuscripts of this era were often copies of copies of copies, meaning scholars have to locate internal evidence for clues to the original date of composition. Many of the poems appear to be much older than the manuscript itself, and contain ancient ceremonial and ritual material. Other poems are songs of love, philosophy, and spirituality. Many of them appear to have had a musical accompaniment.

The Book of the Dances of the Ancients, its original name, was changed to the current title by its first translator.

== Publication ==
The first full Spanish translation was crafted by the Mexican anthropologist and linguist Barrera Vásquez in 1965. In 1982, Munro Edmunson produced an English version, followed by John Curl's online publication in 2005 of selected pieces from the codex. David Bowles, in 2013, composed English-verse translations of all of the songs in his Flower, Song, Dance: Aztec and Mayan Poetry.
