= Campeche Municipality =

Municipality in the Mexican state of Campeche

Coordinates: 19.8184°N 90.5301°W

Campeche
- Municipality

- Coat of arms

- Location within Mexico
- Country: Mexico
- State: Campeche
- Municipal seat: San Francisco de Campeche

Area
  - Total: 3,244.17 km^{2} (1,252.58 sq mi)

Population (2015)
  - Total: 283,025
  - Density: 87.2411/km^{2} (225.953/sq mi)
- Time zone: UTC−6 (CST)

Campeche is one of the 13 municipalities in the Mexican state of Campeche. The municipal seat, and largest settlement, is the city of San Francisco de Campeche (often shortened to Campeche).

== Demographics ==
As of 2010, the municipality had a total population of 259,005.

The municipality had 565 localities, the largest of which (with 2010 populations in parentheses) were: San Francisco de Campeche (220,389), Lerma (8,281), Chiná (5,194), classified as urban, and Los Laureles (2,251), Alfredo V. Bonfil (2,060), Pich (1,756), Tikinmul (1,663), Imí (1,227), Hampolol (1,123), Castamay (1,101), and San Francisco Kobén (1,045), classified as rural.

== See also ==
- List of presidents of Campeche Municipality
