= Candelaria Municipality =

Municipality in the Mexican state of Campeche

Candelaria
- Municipality
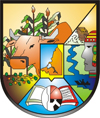
- Coat of arms

- Location of Candelaria

- Location within Campeche Location within Mexico
- Coordinates: 18°0′N 90°45′W
- Country: Mexico
- State: Campeche
- Municipal seat: Candelaria

Government
  - Municipal president: (2006–09)

Area
  - Total: 5,518.5 km^{2} (2,130.72 sq mi)
- Elevation: 49 m (161 ft)

Population (2015)
  - Total: 43,879
  - Density: 7.9512/km^{2} (20.594/sq mi)
- Time zone: UTC−6 (Central (US Central))
- Created: 19 June 1998
- Website: www.candelaria.gob.mx/

Candelaria is one of the 13 municipalities in the Mexican state of Campeche. It is situated at the south of the state, and the municipal seat, and largest settlement, is the city of Candelaria. As of 2010, the population was 41,194. In 2023, Candelaria was designated a Pueblo Mágico by the Mexican government, recognizing its cultural and historical importance.

The name "Candelaria" is in reference to the Río Candelaria, a river which drains the region.

== History ==
On 25 April 1984, the State Congress heard a request made by the residents of the region for it to be established as an autonomous municipality. The municipality of Candelaria was created by the Congress on 19 June 1998.

== Geography ==
The municipality of Candelaria borders to the north with the municipality of Escárcega; to the south with Guatemala and the state of Tabasco; to the east with the municipality of Calakmul, and to the west with the municipality of Carmen. It covers a total surface area of 5,518.55 km^{2}.

The region is a part of a large plain. The lowest altitude is 10 meters above sea level, and the highest is 100 meters above sea level. The plain is generally flat with moderate hills. A large river, the Candelaria River, runs through the municipality.

=== Hydrography ===
The Candelaria region is part of the Grijalva-Usumacinta hydrological system, which includes the Candelaria River. The Candelaria River begins in the Petén Department in Guatemala, (where it is called the San Pedro River), and empties into the Boca de Pargos, in the Carmen Lagoon. The river is 402 km long. Its primary tributaries are the San Pedro River and the Caribbean River, while its primary sub-tributaries include these streams: Las Golondrinas, Ojo de Agua, Pejelagarto, Arroyo Negro, and La Esperanza, the latter being the longest. The Candelaria River has several waterfalls. Some of these include the Waterfall of Death, Grande Waterfall, and Bull Waterfall.

=== Climate ===
This region varies between a warm humid climate and a rainy, warm, Humid subtropical climate, with monsoon rains occurring during the summer. The average annual temperature is 25 degrees Celsius. Annual precipitation in the Candelaria region is approximately 1700 mm, from the period of May to December, with much of that rainfall occurring in the months of September and October.

Climate data for Candelaria (1991–2020)
Month	Jan	Feb	Mar	Apr	May	Jun	Jul	Aug	Sep	Oct	Nov	Dec	Year
Record high °C (°F)	38.0 (100.4)	38.0 (100.4)	42.0 (107.6)	43.5 (110.3)	44.0 (111.2)	44.0 (111.2)	41.0 (105.8)	40.0 (104.0)	39.0 (102.2)	39.0 (102.2)	39.0 (102.2)	38.5 (101.3)	44.0 (111.2)
Mean daily maximum °C (°F)	28.5 (83.3)	30.3 (86.5)	32.8 (91.0)	35.8 (96.4)	36.6 (97.9)	34.4 (93.9)	33.7 (92.7)	33.5 (92.3)	33.1 (91.6)	31.6 (88.9)	30.2 (86.4)	28.8 (83.8)	32.4 (90.3)
Daily mean °C (°F)	22.8 (73.0)	23.9 (75.0)	25.7 (78.3)	28.2 (82.8)	29.3 (84.7)	28.2 (82.8)	27.5 (81.5)	27.4 (81.3)	27.3 (81.1)	26.1 (79.0)	24.7 (76.5)	23.3 (73.9)	26.2 (79.2)
Mean daily minimum °C (°F)	17.1 (62.8)	17.6 (63.7)	18.7 (65.7)	20.6 (69.1)	22.0 (71.6)	21.9 (71.4)	21.3 (70.3)	21.4 (70.5)	21.4 (70.5)	20.5 (68.9)	19.2 (66.6)	17.8 (64.0)	20.0 (68.0)
Record low °C (°F)	7.0 (44.6)	8.0 (46.4)	10.0 (50.0)	10.5 (50.9)	11.8 (53.2)	15.0 (59.0)	15.0 (59.0)	16.0 (60.8)	15.0 (59.0)	13.0 (55.4)	9.0 (48.2)	8.0 (46.4)	7.0 (44.6)
Average precipitation mm (inches)	50.8 (2.00)	39.4 (1.55)	17.8 (0.70)	37.4 (1.47)	106.6 (4.20)	269.2 (10.60)	190.4 (7.50)	246.7 (9.71)	242.5 (9.55)	196.7 (7.74)	105.3 (4.15)	48.8 (1.92)	1,551.6 (61.09)
Average precipitation days (≥ 0.1 mm)	6.0	3.9	2.5	2.5	6.8	15.0	15.0	17.1	16.0	12.6	7.1	6.3	110.8
Source: Servicio Meteorologico Nacional

== Demographics ==
According to the 2005 Population and Housing count, the municipality has a total of 49,850 inhabitants.

As of 2010, the city of Candelaria had a population of 9,812.[1] Other than the city of Candelaria, the municipality had 1,401 localities, the largest of which (with 2010 populations in parentheses) were: Benito Juárez Uno (1,281) and El Naranjo (1,065), classified as rural.
