= Hecelchakán =

City in the Mexican state of Campeche

- City and municipal seat
- Location in Mexico
- Coordinates: 20°10′0″N 90°8′0″W
- Country: Mexico
- State: Campeche
- Municipality: Hecelchakán

Area
  - Total: 514.28 sq mi (1,331.99 km^{2})

Population (2010)
  - Total: 10,285
- Time zone: UTC−6 (Central (US Central))

Hecelchakán (Spanish pronunciation: [xeseltʃaˈkan]) is a city in the Mexican state of Campeche. The city is located some 70 km to the north of the state capital Campeche. It is the seat of the Hecelchakán Municipality. As of 2010, the city of Hecelchakán had a population of 10,285.

The name comes from the Maya words jeʼelel (rest) and chakʼan (savanna).

It is at an altitude of 10 m above sea level.

== Geography ==
=== Climate ===
Climate data for Hecelchakán (1991–2020)
Month	Jan	Feb	Mar	Apr	May	Jun	Jul	Aug	Sep	Oct	Nov	Dec	Year
Record high °C (°F)	40.0 (104.0)	41.0 (105.8)	43.0 (109.4)	45.0 (113.0)	48.0 (118.4)	45.0 (113.0)	42.0 (107.6)	42.0 (107.6)	41.0 (105.8)	39.0 (102.2)	39.0 (102.2)	39.0 (102.2)	48.0 (118.4)
Mean daily maximum °C (°F)	31.4 (88.5)	32.9 (91.2)	35.6 (96.1)	37.2 (99.0)	37.5 (99.5)	35.8 (96.4)	35.4 (95.7)	35.3 (95.5)	34.7 (94.5)	33.6 (92.5)	32.5 (90.5)	31.6 (88.9)	34.5 (94.1)
Daily mean °C (°F)	24.2 (75.6)	25.4 (77.7)	27.4 (81.3)	28.9 (84.0)	29.3 (84.7)	28.7 (83.7)	28.4 (83.1)	28.3 (82.9)	28.0 (82.4)	27.0 (80.6)	25.5 (77.9)	24.7 (76.5)	27.1 (80.8)
Mean daily minimum °C (°F)	16.9 (62.4)	17.9 (64.2)	19.2 (66.6)	20.6 (69.1)	21.1 (70.0)	21.7 (71.1)	21.3 (70.3)	21.3 (70.3)	21.2 (70.2)	20.4 (68.7)	18.5 (65.3)	17.8 (64.0)	19.8 (67.6)
Record low °C (°F)	5.0 (41.0)	6.0 (42.8)	6.5 (43.7)	10.0 (50.0)	9.0 (48.2)	13.0 (55.4)	16.0 (60.8)	18.0 (64.4)	16.0 (60.8)	10.0 (50.0)	10.0 (50.0)	8.0 (46.4)	5.0 (41.0)
Average precipitation mm (inches)	41.0 (1.61)	27.5 (1.08)	16.8 (0.66)	39.9 (1.57)	120.0 (4.72)	222.8 (8.77)	193.6 (7.62)	208.2 (8.20)	238.1 (9.37)	174.8 (6.88)	52.3 (2.06)	28.3 (1.11)	1,363.3 (53.67)
Average precipitation days (≥ 0.1 mm)	4.4	2.6	1.7	2.8	6.3	11.9	13.1	14.2	14.5	11.5	4.4	3.6	91.0
Source: Servicio Meteorologico Nacional

== History ==
The city was founded close to a cenote by inhabitants of the former city of Xkalumkin, between the years 1500 and 1600. In this city some important historic events took place, such as the battle between Don Francisco de Paula Toro and the federalists, led by Don Felipe Montero, who was defeated.

In 1840, the district of Hecelchakán included the towns of Pomuch, Pocboc, Tenabo, Tepakán, San Antonio Sahcabchén, Dzitbalché, Bécal, Nunkiní, and Calkiní.

Around 1846, the district of Hecelchakán included three parishes: Hecelchakán, Calkiní and Bécal.

On December 7, 1915, when decree no. 51 approved a new law of interior administration, Hecelchakán became one of the eight free municipalities of the new state of Campeche. That law came into effect on January 1, 1916.

In 1957 Hecelchakán was given city status by Governor of Campeche Alberto Trueba Urbina.
