= Campeche =

State of Mexico

- State
- Free and Sovereign State of Campeche; Estado Libre y Soberano de Campeche (Spanish); Xóot' Noj Lu'umil Kaampech (Yucatec Maya)
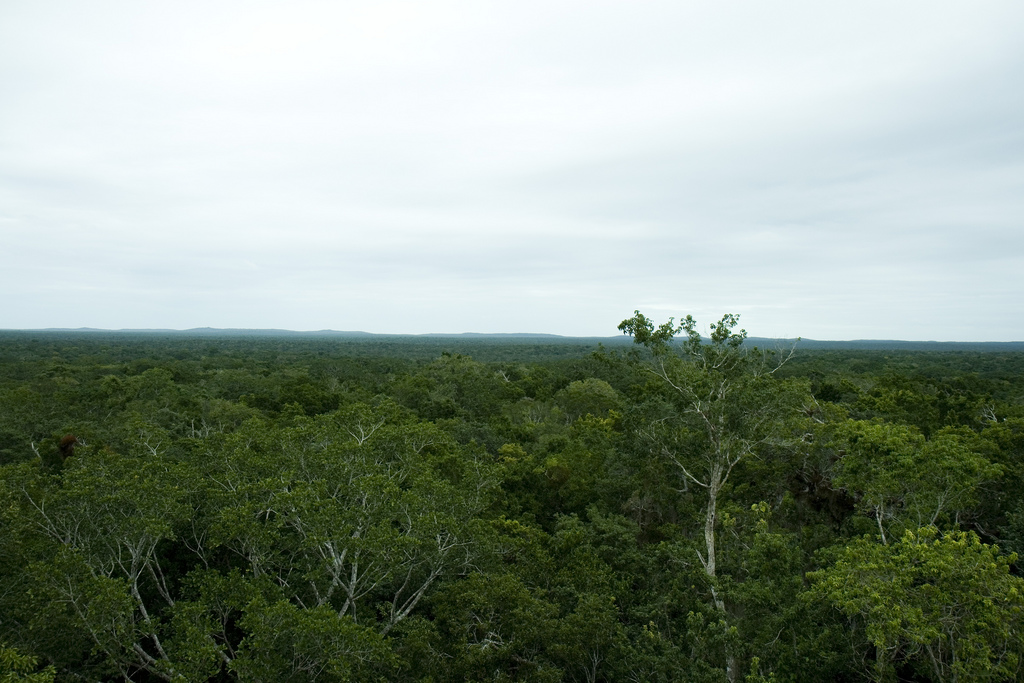
- Calakmul Biosphere Reserve

- Coat of arms
- Anthem: Himno Campechano
- Coordinates: 19°0′N 90°24′W
- Country: Mexico
- Capital and largest city: San Francisco de Campeche
- Municipalities: 13
- Admission: April 29, 1863
- Order: 25th^{[a]}

Government
  - Governor: Layda Elena Sansores (Morena)
  - Senators: Arturo del Carmen Moo Cahuich (Morena); Cecilia Margarita Sánchez García (PRI); Rocío Adriana Abreu Artiñano (Morena)
  - Deputies: Federal deputies: • José Luis Flores Pacheco (Morena) (1st); • María Sierra Damián (Morena) (2nd)

Area
  - Total: 57,507 km^{2} (22,204 sq mi)
- Ranked 17th
- Highest elevation: 390 m (1,280 ft)

Population (2020)
  - Total: 928,363
  - Rank: 30th
  - Density: 16.143/km^{2} (41.811/sq mi)
  - Rank: 29th
- Demonym: Campechano (a)

GDP (2022)
  - Total: MXN 521 billion (US$25.9 billion)
  - Per capita: US$27,562
  - Rank: 1st (per capita)
- Time zone: UTC−6 (Central)
- Postal code: 24
- Area code: Area codes: • 913; • 938; • 981; • 982; • 983; • 996
- ISO 3166 code: MX-CAM
- HDI: ▲0.780 high Ranked 24th of 32
- Website: Official website
- a. Separated from Yucatán on May 3, 1858, was federal territory from 1858 to 1863.

Campeche, (Note: Spanish pronunciation: [kamˈpetʃe]; Yucatec Maya: Kaampech [ˈkàːmpetʃ]) officially the Free and Sovereign State of Campeche, (Note: Spanish: Estado Libre y Soberano de Campeche) is one of the 31 states which, with Mexico City, make up the 32 federal entities of Mexico. Located in southeast Mexico, it is bordered by the states of Tabasco to the southwest, Yucatán to the northeast, Quintana Roo to the east, by the Petén department of Guatemala to the south, and by the Orange Walk District of Belize to the southeast. It has a coastline to the west with the Gulf of Mexico. The state capital, also called Campeche, was declared a World Heritage Site in 1997.

The formation of the state began with the capital, which was founded in 1540 as the Spanish began the conquest of the Yucatán Peninsula. The city was a rich and important port during the colonial period, but declined after Mexico's independence. Campeche was part of the province of Yucatán, but split off in the mid-19th century, mostly due to political friction with the city of Mérida. Much of the state's recent economic revival is due to the discovery of petroleum offshore in the 1970s, which has made the coastal cities of Campeche and Ciudad del Carmen important economic centers. The state has important Mayan and colonial sites; however, these are not as well-known or visited as much as others in the Yucatán.

The state's executive power rests in the governor of Campeche and the legislative power rests in the Congress of Campeche, which is a unicameral legislature composed of 35 deputies.

== Etymology ==
The name Campeche is derived from Can Pech, the Maya name of a chiefdom of the southwestern Yucatán Peninsula that existed at the time of the arrival of the Spanish conquistadors in the sixteenth century. The capital city of the chiefdom of Can Pech was called "Ah-Kin-Pech", where the city of Campeche is now. When the Spanish first arrived to the area in 1517, they called it Lazaro, since "the day of our landing was St. Lazarus' Sunday". The native name means "place of snakes and ticks".

== Geography ==
Campeche is a relatively flat area of Mexico with 523 km (325 mi) of shoreline on the Gulf of Mexico. Most of the surface is of sedimentary rock, much of it of marine origin. The area with the highest elevations is near the borders with Guatemala and Quintana Roo. Notable elevations include Cerro Champerico, Cerro los Chinos, Cerro El Ramonal, Cerro El Doce, and Cerro El Gavilán. However, these hills are separated by large expanses of lower flat land. In the south of the municipality of Champotón begin a series of rolling hills known as the Sierra Alta or Puuc, which extend northeast to Bolonchen and then into the state of Yucatán. These have only an average altitude of between forty and sixty metres (130 and 200 ft) with some reaching 100 m (330 ft). Other areas of these rolling hills lie near the city of Campeche, the main ones known as Maxtum, Boxol and El Morro. Another set is called the Sierra Seybaplaya in the center of the state.

Rainforest areas subdivide into a number of types which include perennial tall tree rainforest, semi perennial tall tree rainforest, deciduous medium height tree rainforest, semi-deciduous medium height tree rainforest, deciduous low height tree rainforest and semi-perennial low height tree rainforest. Away from the coast, these rainforests are interspersed with savannah areas and along the coast are accompanied by areas with sand dunes, mangrove wetlands and estuaries. Species that can be found in the various rainforests include Spanish cedar (Cedrela odorata), oxhorn bucida (Bucida buceras), Campeche logwood (Haematoxylum campechianum), and wild tamarind (Lysiloma latisiliquum). It also includes a number of precious tropical hardwoods such as red cedar (Toona ciliata) Honduran mahogany (Swietenia macrophylla), ziricote (Cordia dodecandra) and Hollywood (Guaiacum sanctum). Along the coastal areas, palms dominate such as the coconut tree (Cocos nucifera) and royal palm (Roystonea regia). The main wildlife species in the state are the jaguar, ocelot, puma, deer, collared peccary, raccoon, hare, ring-tailed cat and Yucatan spider monkey. There are many bird species including the plain chachalaca, quail, pelican, and toucan. Reptiles include rattlesnakes, coral snakes, boa constrictors, various species of sea and land turtles, iguanas, and crocodiles. While still rich in wildlife, much has been decimated because of agriculture and exploitation of forest resources destroying habitat as well as uncontrolled hunting. Most of the state's aquatic life — including many species of fish, crustaceans, and mollusks — is found in the Bay of Campeche. Many of these are exploited commercially.

Most of the state's surface freshwater is in the south and southwest, with rivers, small lakes and estuaries. These diminish in the north where rainfall rapidly filtrates into the subsoil. The rivers in the south and southwest belong to various basins, with the largest being the Grijalva to which the Candelaria, Chumpán and Mamantal Rivers belong. The -Usumacinta also flows in the state but it tends to change course frequently and occasionally divides into branches. The east branch of this river is also called the Palizada River, which has the largest volume although it is narrow. The San Pedro River is another branch of the Usumacinta, which passes by Jonuta Municipality in Tabasco before emptying in the Gulf of Mexico. The Chumpán River is an isolated river formed by the union of various streams. It runs north–south and empties in the Laguna de Terminos. The Candelaria River forms in Petén, Guatemala and runs north–south and empties into the Laguna de Pargos. The Mamantel River empties into the Laguna de Panlau. The Champotón River is in the center of the state and empties into the Gulf of Mexico. The rest of the state's streams flow only in the rainy season.

The Laguna de Términos lagoon is located in the southwest of the state, near the border with Tabasco. It is separated from the Gulf of Mexico only by the Isla del Carmen. It receives freshwater from most of Campeche's rivers as well as saltwater from the Gulf of Mexico. In these brackish waters have developed a number of aquatic species such as sea bass, small sharks, crabs, oysters, turtles, and storks. The lagoon is ringed by smaller lakes and forms the most important lake-lagoon system in the country. These lakes include Atasta, Pom, Puerto Rico, El Este, Del Vapor, Del Corte, Pargos and Panlau. This system formed about five thousand years ago by the accumulation of sediment carried by surrounding rivers. This system connects to the Sabancuy estuary to the northeast.

Campeche is in the tropics; it has a humid climate, with a defined rainy season, and a relatively dry season from late winter to early spring. Average annual rainfall varies between 900 and 2,000 mm (35 and 79 in). The hottest and most humid areas of the state are along the coast between the Laguna de Términos and the northern border. Average annual temperature is 26 °C (79 °F) with highs up to 36 °C (97 °F) in the summer and lows of 17 °C (63 °F) in the winter. Prevailing winds are from the northwest from November to March, from the north between September and October, from the southeast from June to August and from the south in April and May. In the winter, storms from the north called "nortes" can bring colder dry air from the area of the United States. In the late summer, there are sometimes hurricanes.

The state has a number of ecosystems, from rainforest, to savanna to coast and sea. Environmentally, the state is divided into four major regions. The coastal region consists of the entire coastline of the state and a strip of shallow water just offshore called the Campeche Bank with coral reefs and low islands called cays. The region has large expanses of mangroves that dominate the swamps. Non-swamp areas are dominated by palm trees. Wildlife is dominated by bird and reptile species such as storks, pelicans, ducks, seagulls, lizards, turtles and water snakes. The mountain region is in the north and east of the state consisting of two chains of low hills called the Dzibalchen and Sierra Alta. It also includes the savannah area and an area called Los Chenes, where natural wells (called cenotes) are common. This area is noted for its tropical hardwoods and the chicle or gum tree. Wildlife includes deer, armadillos, rabbits, quail, and woodpeckers. The rainforest region is located on the center and south of the state with a wide variety of trees including tropical hardwoods such as mahogany. Many of the plants used in the state's cuisine such as achiote and tropical fruits are from here. The river region is located in the southwest of the state, named after the various rivers that flow here, mostly emptying into the Laguna de Términos. It has the hottest and most humid climate in Campeche with wildlife and vegetation similar to that found in both the Rainforest and Coast regions.

=== Environment and protected areas ===
Campeche has four protected areas: the Calakmul Biosphere Reserve, the Laguna de Términos Reserve, Ría Celestún Biosphere Reserve, and the Los Petenes Biosphere Reserve. The Calakmul Reserve was created in 1989 over 723,185 hectares (1,787,030 acres). It consists of Yucatán and Tehuantepec moist forests, containing high and medium growth semi-deciduous forests and seasonally flooded low height semi-deciduous forests. There is also aquatic vegetation. The Laguna de Términos Reserve includes the lagoon and the area surrounding it with an area of 705,017 hectares (1,742,130 acres). It was established in 1994. Los Petenes is a natural reserve consisting of isolated pockets of rainforest with mangrove areas in between. The wildlife is dependent on a varied and complex system of fresh and brackish water. The reserve extends over 382 hectares (940 acres) in the municipalities of Campeche, Tenabo, Hecelchakán and Calkiní.

In Isla Arena, Campeche, within the Ría Celestún Biosphere Reserve, Conservation International Mexico and CONANP carried out a pilot community mangrove restoration project aimed at restoring 217 hectares of degraded and dead mangroves, emphasizing hydrological restoration to recover water flow and ecosystem function in impacted areas.

== History ==
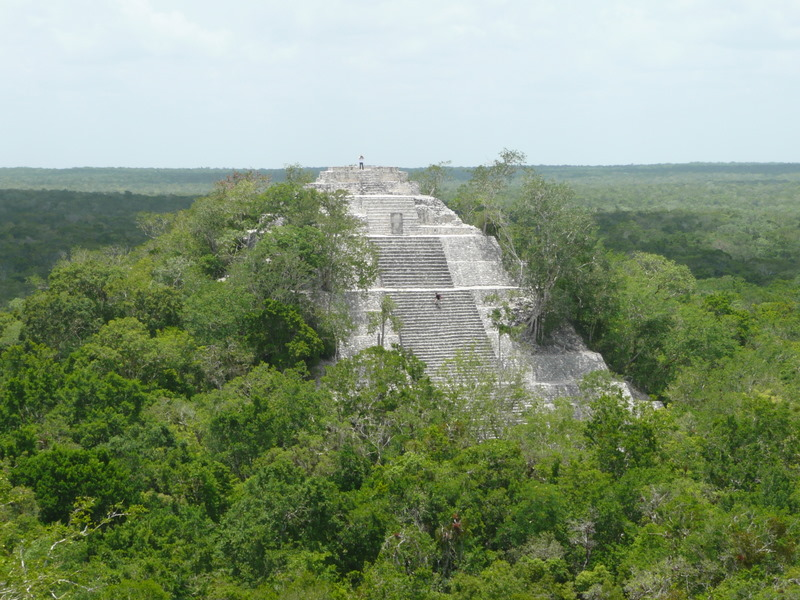
View of one of the Maya pyramids at Calakmul

The first people to dominate the area were the Maya, who arrived to Campeche from Guatemala, Honduras and Chiapas. The main Mayan cities in Campeche were Edzná, Xtampak, and later Calakmul and Becán. The Maya civilization reached its height between 600 AD and 900 AD. From 1000 AD on, the Maya cities collapsed and were abandoned for unknown reasons. This led to the establishment of smaller settlements and a mixing of the Maya and Chontal people in the south of the state, which had commercial ties to the central highland cultures of Mexico. From the 11th century to the 16th century, Campeche was divided into smaller dominions.

The first Spaniards in the area were Francisco Hernández de Córdoba and Antón de Alaminos in 1517, who landed at a settlement called Can-Pech, part of the Sol Garrapata dominion. He renamed it San Lázaro. He moved onto the territory of Chakanputon (today Champotón) where he and his men were attacked by the warriors of this dominion. Hernandez de Cordoba died of his wounds from this battle, prompting the Spanish to call this bay the "Bahía de Mala Pelea" (Bay of the Bad Fight). The conquest of Campeche and the rest of the Yucatán Peninsula began in earnest in 1540, under Francisco de Montejos, senior and junior.

"...Campeche, upon the Western coast, is the second town in the province; it has a good citadel, a large harbor not deep, a dock-yard, and many merchants. The city was taken in 1685 by English and French buccaneers, who plundered every place within 15 leagues round it for the space of two months..."

— Thomas Kitchin, The Present State of the West-Indies: Containing an Accurate Description of What Parts Are Possessed by the Several Powers in Europe, 1778

The Spanish introduced sugar cane and other crops in the area, starting in the 1540s, but the main value of the area was the port of Campeche, established in 1540 where the old Maya village used to be. During the colonial era, it was a commercial port equal to Havana and Cartagena even though piracy was a constant threat. It shipped valuable exports such as agricultural goods, tropical hardwoods and dyewood, then a widely used textile dye in Europe. It also handled gold and silver from other areas in Mexico going to Spain. Imported items to the port included luxury items such as Italian marble and crystal chandeliers from Austria. The Spanish built a European-based colonial city here and as it became rich, it was filled with large mansions. However, to survive in the hot and humid environment, the Europeans also adapted a number of Maya products such as hammocks for sleeping and storing drinking water in hollow gourds. They also built with the area's local red cedar, mahogany and "sahcab" a local limestone. The shipping in these waters attracted pirates such as John Hawkins, Francis Drake, Diego the Mulatto, Henry Morgan, Cornelis Jol, Bartolomeu Português, Lewis Scot and Roche Braziliano. Most of the attacks were at the port of Campeche, but Champontón also suffered significant attacks in 1644 and 1672. Fortification of the city of Campeche began as early as 1610, but these structures were insufficient. The worst pirate attack occurred in 1685, when Laurens de Graaf sacked the city of Campeche and the surrounding haciendas for over thirty days, killing about a third of the area's population. This prompted far more extensive fortification with numerous forts and a wall around the city that measured 2,560 metres (8,400 ft) in an irregular polygon shape. Most of the forts survived but only 500 metres (1,600 ft) of the original wall remains. These fortifications cut the threat of pirate attacks but it remained walled until 1890. Campeche was officially recognized as a city in 1774 (the first in southeast Mexico) and in 1784 was declared a minor port. In 1804, the port was closed due to the war between Spain and England. This caused discontentment in the city and fomented insurgent tendencies.

Campeche remained a wealthy and important port until the early 19th century, when a number of events brought on the decline. In 1811, the port of Sisal was opened in what is now the State of Yucatán, taking much of the city's business. Another issue was that Independence brought the abolition of slavery, cutting agricultural production. The lack of shipping made the city relatively isolated from Mexico City. From the 19th century until the latter 20th, the state's economy was dependent on agriculture, fishing, logging and salt mining.

In September 1821, the city of Campeche proclaimed its adherence to the Plan of Iguala and the new Independent government of Mexico, forcing out its last Spanish governor a month later. At Independence, Campeche was one of the two most important cities on the Yucatán Peninsula, along with Mérida. There was political friction between the two. Campeche was the more liberal of the two, and supported the 1824 Mexican Constitution which established the Federal Republic. In 1824, Campeche's representative proposed that the peninsula be divided into two states: Mérida and Campeche but this was not accepted. Political divisions intensified along with the nationwide struggle between Liberals and Conservatives.

Despite Campeche's and Mérida's differences, both were involved in an insurrection against Mexico City headed by Jerónimo López de Llergo in 1839 with the aim of creating an independent state of Yucatán. After initial victories, López de Llergo proclaimed the peninsula independent and in 1841, the Constitution of the Yucatán was promulgated on federalist principles. Yucatán independence did not solve the peninsula's internal political problems. Mérida's trade with Havana continued but Campeche's trade with Mexico City was cut off. Campeche wanted to rejoin Mexico for this reason and Andrés Quintana Roo tried to work out a settlement between the two cities. Mexican president Antonio López de Santa Anna then sent an expedition to force the Yucatán back into Mexico. More fighting came with the outbreak of the Caste War, in 1847, an indigenous rebellion that took place in Campeche and the rest of the Yucatán. This and foreign pressure to pay debts forced the Yucatan to formally reintegrate into Mexico in 1849.

The Constitution of 1857 completely broke the schism between Campeche and Mérida with various rebellions breaking out. During one of these 150 men took over one of the main forts of Campeche and demanded a political union consisting of it, Champotón and Isla del Carmen. Other settlements in the west of the peninsula expressed their desire to be partitioned with these areas as a new state. In 1858, representatives from Campeche and Mérida signed an agreement to divide the peninsula, which was ratified to make the division official.

During the French Intervention in Mexico, forces under Felipe Navarrete took Campeche and forced the state to rejoin the rest of the Yucatán. In 1864, insurgents defeated the imperial army in Hecelchakán and in 1867, they retook Campeche to regain the state's independence.

During the Mexican Revolution, Manuel Castilla Brito took up arms in Campeche in support of Francisco I. Madero. However, the insurgents were defeated by General Manuel Rivera, a Victoriano Huerta supporter in 1913. Forces loyal to Venustiano Carranza entered Campeche in 1914. Slavery and serfdom was abolished on the haciendas. In 1917, Campeche wrote its current constitution.

There was some improvement in the state's economy starting in the 1950s when fishing and timber industries became more developed and there was better communication between the state and Mexico City. In 1955, the University of Campeche was founded and a state system of middle schools was begun. However, Campeche's main economic change come with the discovery of oil off its shores in a shallow water region called the Sonda de Campeche. This oil was discovered by a fisherman named Rudesindo Cantarell in 1971, who reported an oil slick. In 1975, the first oil platform, called Chac Number One began operations. The first set of offshore platforms were completed by 1979. The find has made the state the top producer of petroleum in Mexico, providing 70% of all oil pumped in the country. The economic boom tripled the population of the city of Campeche in ten years, and nearly doubled that of Ciudad del Carmen, which before was only a small fishing village. However, the production of oil has brought environmental problems to the area, especially fishing yields, as well as internal strife between locals and newcomers.

In the mid-1980s, about 25,000 Guatemalan refugees had fled into the state to escape civil war there.

The oil money allowed for the revitalization of the city of Campeche starting in the 1980s. The State Office of Cultural Heritage Sites and Monuments bought abandoned properties to restore them for use as museums, schools, theaters and a library. More than a thousand facades and monuments have been refurbished in the historic center and the oldest residential areas.

In the 1990s, a number of textile mills of the "maquiladora" type were opened in the state. The capital was declared a World Heritage Site by UNESCO.

The most recently created municipality is Candelaria in 1998.

In 2004 the Mexican Air Force videoed unidentified flying objects over southern Campeche.

In 2017, the territorial dispute with Quintana Roo was archived by the Supreme Court, basically giving Campeche 10,500 sq km.

== Economy ==
Total: Campeche contributes 1.83% of Mexico's total GDP. The average salary per year in the state is $141,088 pesos in comparison to the national average of $99,114. However, there is a very large discrepancy between highly paid oil workers, mostly coming from out of state, and locals who do not work for PEMEX. Most land is owned as community property under the ejido system (61%). Twenty nine percent is privately owned and the rest is under state or federal control. Three out of four residences are in urban areas, which generally have basic services. Most of these have cement foundations, with cinderblock walls and brick or cement roofs. Rural residences are usually constructed from local materials which may have roofs of laminate, palm fronds or even cardboard, walls made of laminate or wood, with foundations generally of cement or packed earth. Overall in the state, running water, garbage collection and electricity are available in over 80% of homes, but sewage in only a third. Over sixty five percent of the territory is exploited for forestry products, with over 25% used for grazing, with only 3.3% used for agriculture and about 5.5% used for other purposes such as human settlements.

Only 3.3% of the state's land is used for raising crops due to the soil composition. Over ninety percent of cropland is used for seasonal crops such as corn with the rest used for perennials such as fruit trees. The most important crop is corn, followed by rice and sorghum. Other important crops include jalapeño chili peppers, watermelon, sugar cane and various tropical and non-tropical fruit-bearing trees, especially citrus and mango. Most cattle are raised in the center and south of the state for both meat and milk products and account for the most product by volume. In the north, most commercially raised livestock is domestic fowl mostly chickens and turkeys, but domestic fowl is raised in most rural homes all over the state. Sheep and goats are raised sparsely all over the state, depending on local vegetation. Forestry, including the extraction of precious tropical hardwoods, remains an important economic activity despite the degradation of many of the state's forests. Commercial fishing is mostly done along the coast, with shrimp being the most valuable catch, followed by crustaceans and mollusks. This is mostly done in the coast reason, where most of the economy outside of oil production relies on fishing and the building and repair of fishing boats.

The secondary sector of the economy (mining, construction and industry) is almost entirely concentrated in the coastal area of the state in the municipalities of Campeche, Carmen and Champotón. Mining, mostly oil production, accounts for 52.8% of the state's GDP. This oil lies off the coast of the state, in a shallow water section of the Gulf of Mexico called the Sonda de Campeche. Campeche oil and gas production accounts for 37% of Mexico's total with crude oil alone accounting for 76% in absolute numbers. Campeche does not have metal deposits but it does have deposits of building stone, such as sandstone, marble and limestone, sand, gravel, lime, clay and other minerals. Most deposits are located in the municipalities of Hopelchén, Champotón and Calakmul. In the far north of the coast region, there are important deposits of salt. Construction and manufacturing account for 6.7% of the state's GDP. The most common type of industry relates to food and food processing including seafood, soft drinks, cookies, flour, sugar and honey. Another common industry is that of building materials such as cinderblock, wood products and the processing of building stone. Most industries are small with little financing for technology and growth. Since the 1990s, factories of the "maquiladora" type have opened in the state, such as the Calkiní Shirt Company in Tepacan, Calkiní, Textiles Blazer in Lerma, Campeche, Quality Textil de Campeche in Becal, Calkiní and Karims Textile and Apparel México in the city of Campeche.

Commerce and services account for 33.2% of the state's GDP. The commerce sector of the economy is mostly traditional with small establishments catering to local or regional needs. In the larger cities, supermarkets and malls can be found. Most commerce with entities outside of Campeche is in seafood, agricultural and forestry products. The state has thirty-four traditional public markets. All petroleum products are marketed by the national oil company PEMEX. The state has about five hundred businesses dedicated to tourism, about half of which are restaurants, a little less than a quarter bars and a similar number of handcraft shops. There are 126 major hotels, mostly in the municipalities of Campeche, Ciudad del Carmen and Champotón.

== Culture ==
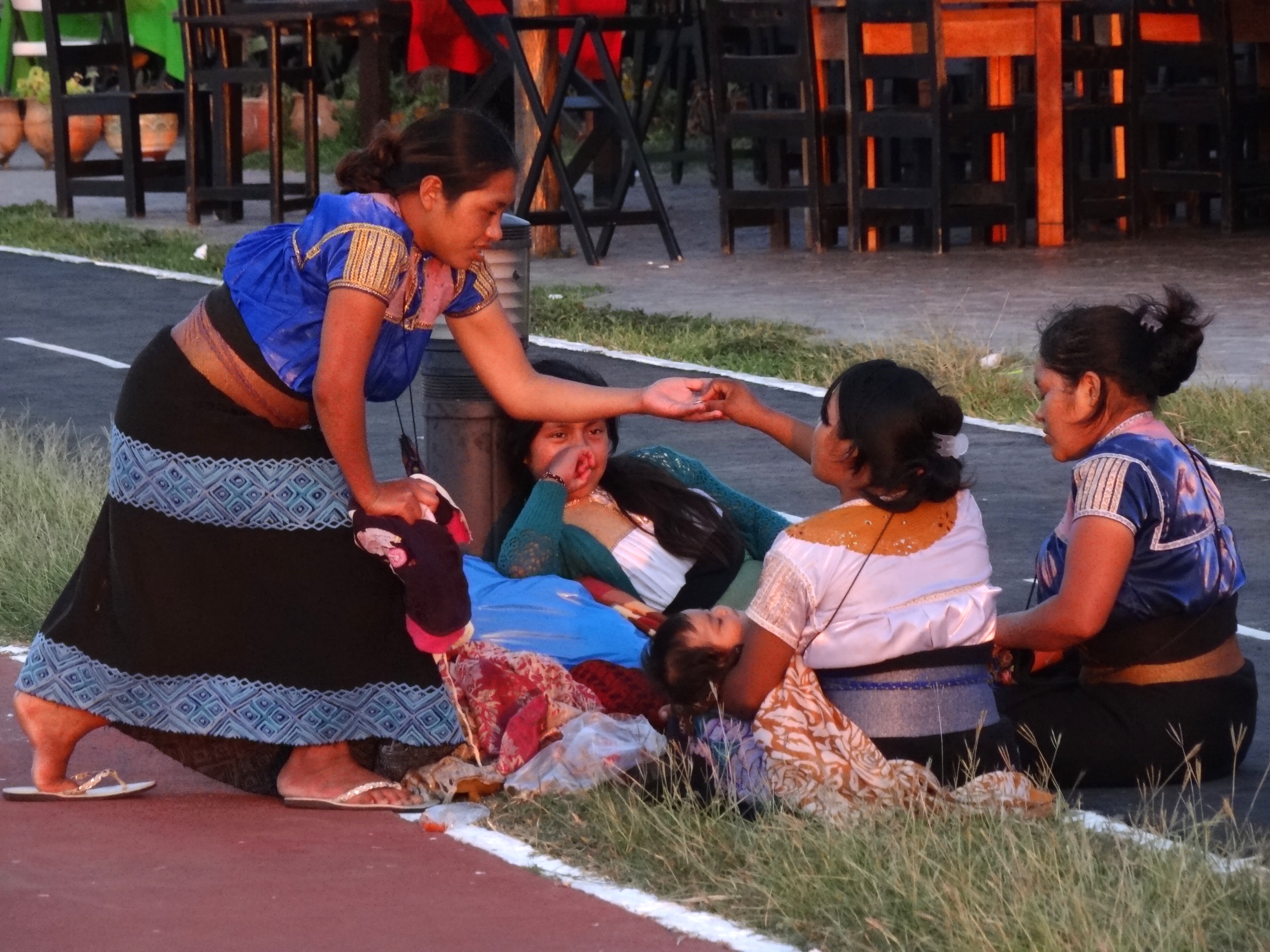
Maya family in Campeche

The state has two main government-sponsored cultural festivals, the Festival del Centro Histórico and the Festival de Jazz. Campeche has a Festival del Centro Histórico in November and December, which attracts over 5,000 artists, intellectuals and academics to over 800 events such as concerts, theater, dance, book presentations, and workshops. The Festival de Jazz was begun in 1999 and has had the participation of figures such as Mike Stern, Caribbean Jazz Project, Yazzkin, Chano Domínguez, Eugenio Toussaint, David Gilmore and Scott Henderson. One notable economic fair outside the city is the "Jipi" Sombrero Festival in Bécal in April and May.

The largest religious festival in the state is Carnival in the city of Campeche. Carnival was introduced in 1582. By 1688, the annual event featured orchestras and in 1815, formal dances called "saraos" were organized which originally were held only in the homes of the elite. Later in the 19th century, events in the streets for the masses became popular, with the various neighborhoods of the city organizing their own events. Eventually, these merged into a citywide celebration featuring various traditional dances such as Baile del Pavo, Son de la Cucaracha, the fandango, fandanguillo and various forms of tropical jaranas. They also include more risqué dances such as those called la Culebra, Los Papagayos and la Contradanza de los Palitos which have Afro-Caribbean influence. Other important religious festivals include Candlemas (Candelaria) in Hool, Champotón and Campeche, feast day of Our Lady of Mount Carmen in Ciudad del Carmen, feast day of Saint Joachim in Palizada, and the feast day of Saint Roman in Campeche, the feast of San Isidro Labrador in Calkiní in May, the feast of the Cristo Negro in San Román, Day of the Dead in all of the state, feast of the Holy Cross in Sabancuy, Carmen in May, feast of Our Lady of Mount Carmen in Ciudad del Carmen in July and the feast of the Señor de la Salud in Hecelchakán in April. During these festivals is when the state's most traditional music, called jarana, and traditional dances can be heard and seen.

As a Mayan region, Campeche has had corn as its staple since the pre-Hispanic period, accompanied by beans, vegetables, tropical fruits and seafood, with some meat. There are two main types of cuisine: "mestizo" is mostly of Spanish origin with some indigenous additions, while Maya is almost purely indigenous. Some foods have been reinvented. One is papak'sul, or papadzul, which was made with beans and chili peppers. Today it is a torilla filled with cooked egg and squash seed salsa. Common seasonings are a mix of indigenous and those which came from Europe such as salt, oregano, pepper, habanero chili peppers, achiote, cloves and vinegar. Regional dishes include cochinita pibil, beans with pork, pork with achiote, panuchos, empanadas, chanchanes, chocolomo, tamales, shark tacos, pickled vines, seafood such as many species of fish, shrimp, octopus and crustaceans. Similar to cochinita pibil, pibipollos are chickens roasted in underground pits, most often prepared for Day of the Dead. There is also a large number of seafood-based dishes such as pan de cazón. One notable shrimp dish is made with giant prawns and called "siete barbas". Tamales are filled with ground pork or chicken seasoned with achiote, pibil or sweet corn. The staple bread is the corn tortilla. The town of Pomuch in the municipality of Hecelchakán is known for its bread and has a type named after it.(turimsoenc) Cheese was mostly likely influenced by pirates with queso de bola related to Dutch cheese-making traditions.

== Education ==
The average number of years of schooling for those over age 15 is 8.5, which means that most finish middle school. This is slightly under the national average of 8.6. Over 55% finish primary school and over 35% finish a level over high school, either in technical training or university. The state has over 1800 schools from preschool to university level. These include seventeen teachers' colleges and twenty eight other institutions of higher education.

The first educational institution in the state was located in the former monastery of San José in the city of Campeche, founded by the Jesuits in 1756 called the Colegio Clerical de San José. In 1823, its name was changed to the Colegio Clerical de San Miguel de Estrada. After the Reform Laws closed the monastery, The Instituto Campechano was established in 1859 by then-governor Pablo Garcia in the same building. The Institute operated until the mid-20th century when it was replaced by the University of Campeche, which was initially housed at the institute.

The Universidad Autónoma de Campeche was founded in 1957 by the state to systematize higher education in the state as its first major university. The institution operated out of several buildings until the mid-1960s, when the Ciudad Universitaria campus was built, and named the Universidad del Sudeste. This name was changed to the current one in 1989. The university offers twenty three bachelor's degrees, and eight graduate degrees.

The Instituto Tecnológico de Campeche was founded in 1976 as the Instituto Tecnológico Regional de Campeche as part of a nationwide system of technical colleges with only two majors. The college gained its own campus in 1978 and its current name was adopted in the 1980s.

== Demographics ==
Largest cities or towns in Campeche Source:
Rank		Municipality	Pop.
1	San Francisco de Campeche	Campeche	249,626
2	Ciudad del Carmen	Carmen	191,238
3	Champotón	Champotón	35,799
4	Escárcega	Escárcega	31,375
5	Calkiní	Calkiní	15,949
6	Dzitbalché	Dzitbalché	13,208
7	Hecelchakán	Hecelchakán	11,418
8	Candelaria	Candelaria	11,121
9	Pomuch	Hecelchakán	9,607
10	Seybaplaya	Seybaplaya	9,515

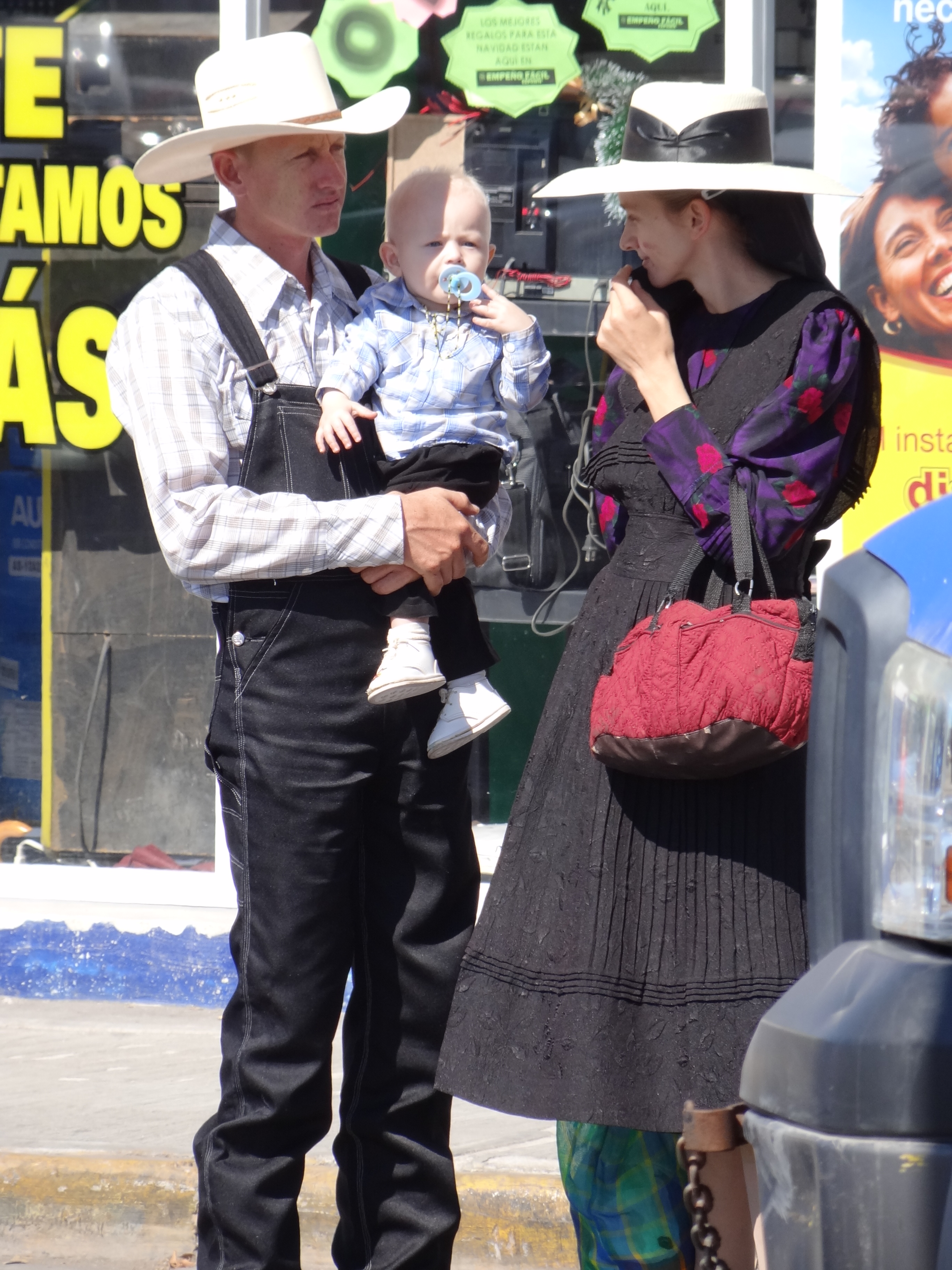
Mennonite family in Campeche

As of 2015, the state has a total population of 899,931. Seventy-five percent live in urban areas along the coast and twenty-five percent live in rural areas. The most populated municipality is Campeche. Most of the state's population growth has occurred since 1970 when the population then was only 215,600.

The most commonly spoken indigenous language spoken in the state is Yucatec Maya, with 71,852 speakers. This is followed by Chol, with 10,412, Tzeltal with 1,900 and Q'anjob'al with 1,557. There are a total of 91,094 speakers of an indigenous language in the state, which is about 12% of the total population. This is up from just under 90,000 in 2005. Fourteen percent of these speakers do not speak Spanish. There are about 7,000 Plautdietsch-speaking Mennonites of German descent in the State of Campeche, mostly around Hopelchen and Hecelchakán. These Menonnites came in the 1980s from the Mennonite settlements which were founded in 1922 and 1924 in the states of Chihuahua and Durango, partly via Zacatecas. According to the 2020 Census, 2.08% of Campeche's population identified as Black, Afro-Mexican, or of African descent.

Religion in Campeche (2010 census)
Roman Catholicism	63.1%
Other Christian	21.1%
Other Religion	0.1%
No religion	11.5%
Unspecified	4.2%

Sixty three percent of the population profess the Catholic faith as of 2010. Most those who are non Catholic belong to Evangelical or Protestant churches. The National Presbyterian Church in Mexico has a large percentage of followers in Tabasco State.

Historical population
Year	Pop.	±%
1895	88,144	—
1900	86,542	−1.8%
1910	86,661	+0.1%
1921	76,419	−11.8%
1930	84,630	+10.7%
1940	90,460	+6.9%
1950	122,098	+35.0%
1960	168,219	+37.8%
1970	251,556	+49.5%
1980	420,553	+67.2%
1990	535,185	+27.3%
1995	642,516	+20.1%
2000	690,689	+7.5%
2005	754,730	+9.3%
2010	822,441	+9.0%
2015	899,931	+9.4%
2020	928,363	+3.2%
2015 data source

== Municipalities ==
The state of Campeche is located in southeast Mexico, on the west side of the Yucatan Peninsula. The territory comprises 56,858.84 square kilometres (21,953.32 sq mi), which is 2.6% of Mexico's total. It borders the states of Yucatán, Quintana Roo and Tabasco, with the country of Guatemala to the south and the Gulf of Mexico to the west. Politically, it is divided into thirteen municipalities: Calakmul, Calkiní, Campeche, Candelaria, Carmen, Champotón, Dzitbalché, Escárcega, Hecelchakán, Hopelchén, Palizada, Seybaplaya, and Tenabo.

== Communications and transportation ==
=== Media ===
The state has eighteen radio stations (fifteen of them commercial), seventeen television channels, one of which is local, ten from Mexico City and the rest cable or satellite, and four local newspapers, along with various from Mexico City. Newspapers of Campeche include: Crónica de Campeche, El Sur de Campeche, Expreso de Campeche, La Ira Noticias para Mí Campeche, Novedades de Campeche, and Tribuna (Campeche). Telephone service is still mostly landline, but cellular infrastructure is growing.

=== Transport ===
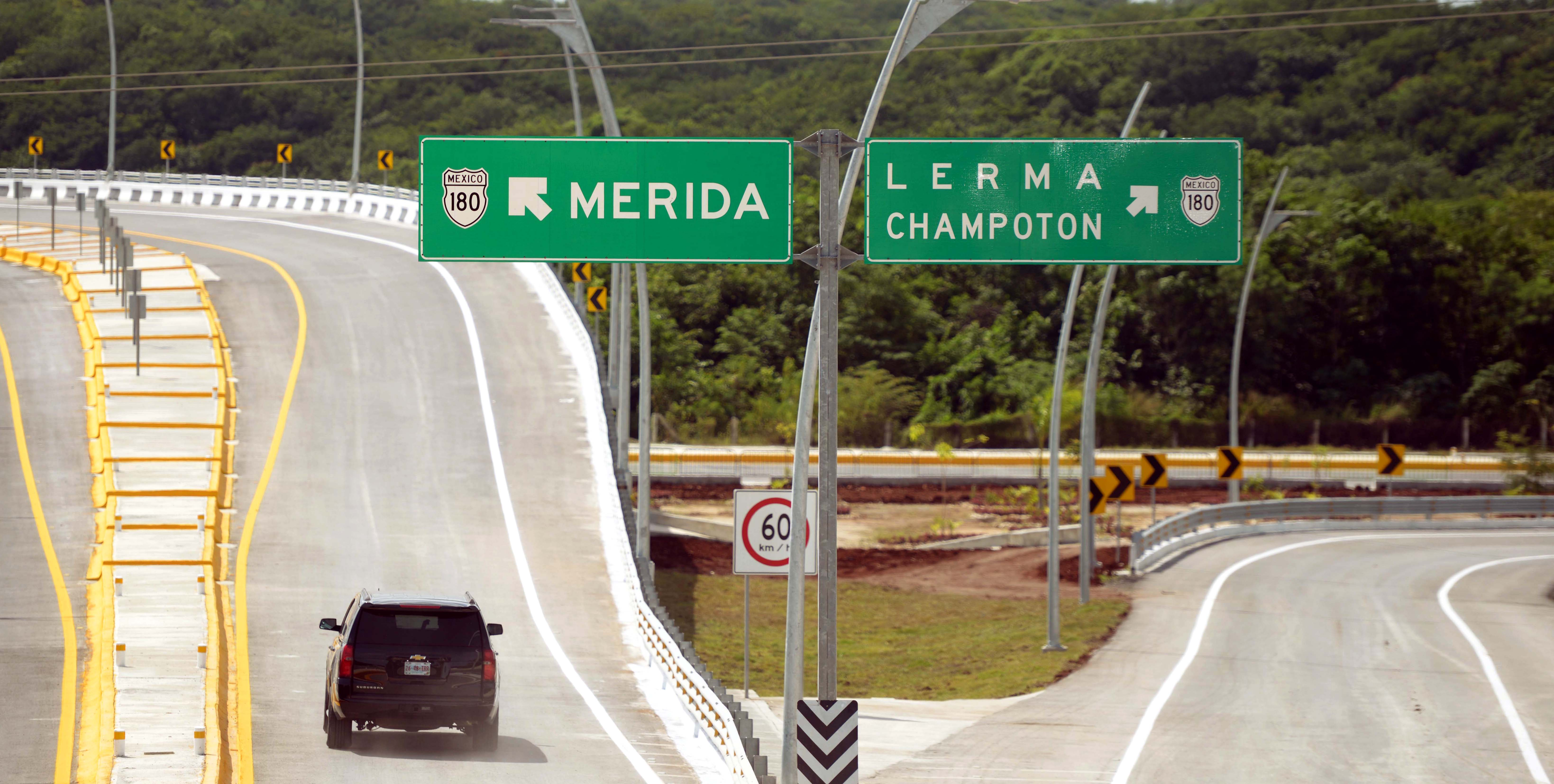
Section of the Periférico Pablo García y Montilla, which traverses the limits of Campeche City

The state has 3,872.69 km (2,406.38 mi) of highway, about a third of which is federal, connecting urban areas. There are eight nine main bridges, most of which are just to the south of the city of Campeche and near Ciudad del Carmen. The two largest are the Puente de la Unidad and Zacatal, which connect Ciudad del Carmen with the mainland. Other important bridges exist in Champotón, Candelaria and Palizada. Federal Highway 180 is the main thoroughfare in the state, running along the coast from the Tabasco state border connecting Ciudad del Carmen and Campeche with Mérida in Yucatán state. There are 403.84 km (250.93 mi) of rail line and two main airports in Campeche and Ciudad del Carmen. The latter also has a heliport and there are twenty five over air strips in other parts of the state. The shoreline has thirty-seven commercial and military docks. The presence of PEMEX is the main force behind the building and maintenance of port infrastructure. The most developed public transportation is in the city of Campeche, although buses, taxis and other public transportation are available in most towns.

The Campeche airport, officially named Ing. Alberto Acuña Ongay, serves the city and port of Campeche with domestic service, mostly to Mexico City. Opened in 1965, it served about 100,000 passengers in 2009.

Intercity rail transit came in 2023 with the Tren Maya, which connects to cities across the Yucatán peninsula. The Campeche Light Train, an autonomous rapid transit guided bus, opened in 2025 and connects the historic center to the Tren Maya station.

== Tourism ==
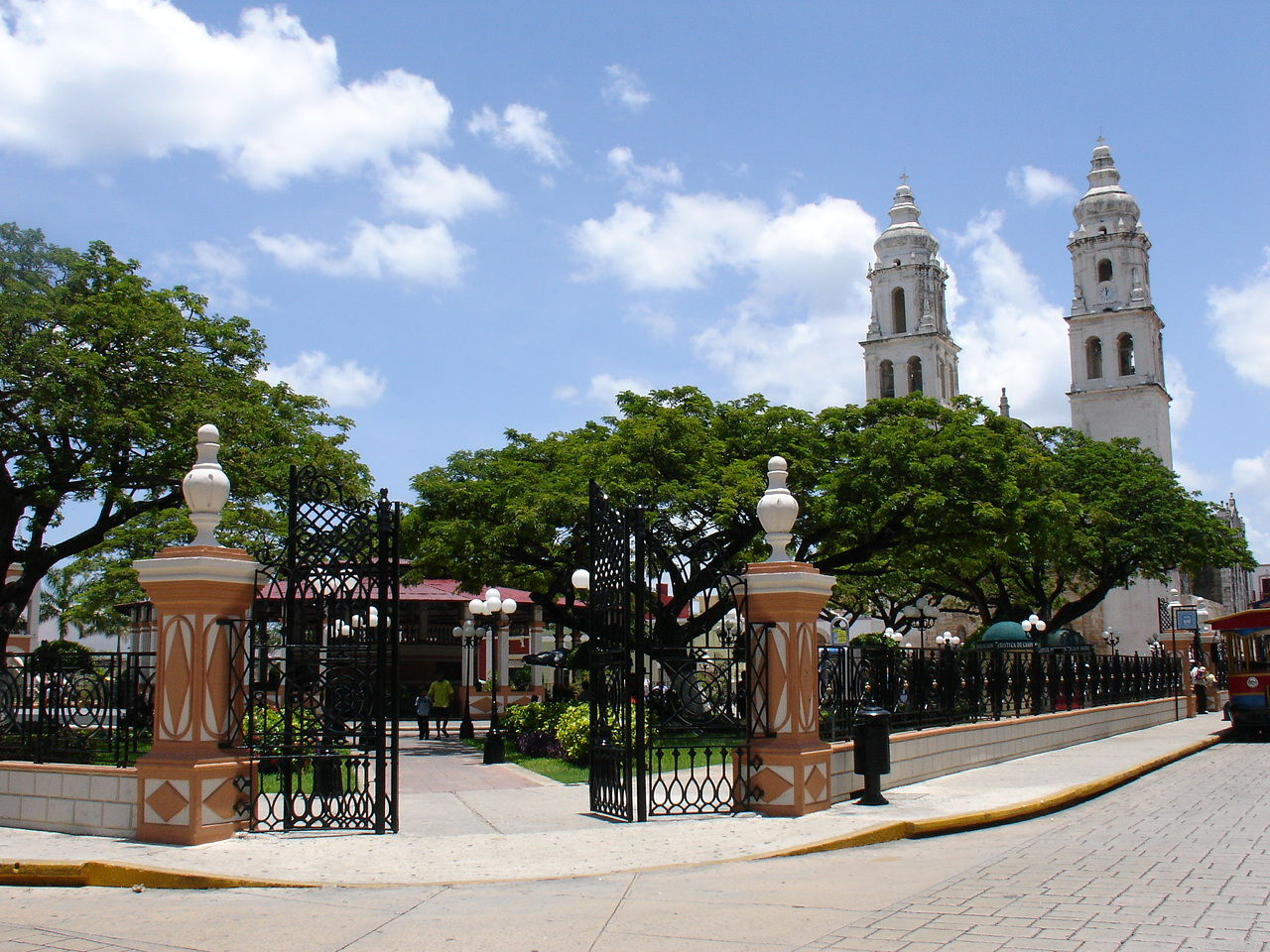
Main plaza and Campeche Cathedral

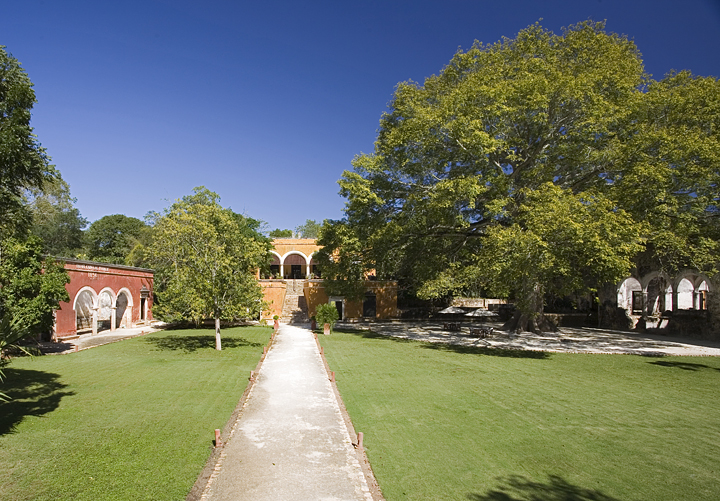
View of Hacienda Uayamón

The city Campeche (formally known as San Francisco de Campeche) is one of the least known and most overlooked colonial cities in Mexico, mostly bypassed by those visiting more famous destinations in the Yucatan peninsula. The city's historic buildings are protected by decree to keep them from being destroyed or altered by the growth of the city. Campeche was one of the most important ports in New Spain. It suffered more than 21 major pirate attacks in the colonial era. After 1685, the city's main fortifications were begun taking 24 years to complete. They succeeded in stopping major pirate attacks, with only one, Barbillas, finding a way to enter the city in 1708. The fortifications consisted of a formidable wall with four main gates, three opening to land and one to the sea. It also included a number of forts such as San Carlos, Santa Rosa, San Juan and San Francisco. Stories persist that many of the mansions had tunnels to escape pirates, but these have never been found.

The state has a number of colonial-era churches. The Asunción church in Dzitbalché was constructed in the 18th century, with a pointed arch doorway, choral window and bell-gable. The Guadalupe Church in Bécal, Calkiní was built in the 18th century. The San Diego Apóstol Church in Nunkiní, Calkiní was built in the late 16th and early 17th centuries. The church and former monastery of San Luis Obispo is located in Calkiní, built in the 17th century of stone, wood and metal over a former Mayan temple. The facade is simple with a bell-gable and there remains only one of its original Baroque altarpieces, which was made in the 16th century. The Catedral de Nuestra Señora de la Purísima Concepción is from the 16th century. Its façade is of worked stone with two levels marked off by two grooved pilasters. The San Francisco Church in Campeche was established in the 16th century although the current building dates from the 17th. The church marks the spot where the first mass was held on mainland America. Most of the state's colonial era churches are located in and near the city of Campeche, with some in Ciudad del Carmen. The Nuestra Señora del Carmen Church in Ciudad del Carmen was built in the 18th century. The Sagrado Corazón de Jesús Church was built in the 18th century in Sabancuy, Carmen. The church and former monastery of San Francisco de Asís was begun in the 16th century by the Franciscans in Hecelchakán.

Outside of the city Campeche, much of the notable civil architecture in the state is found on the various former haciendas. Many of these haciendas have been turned into hotels, spas and other tourist attractions. Hacienda Blanca Flor is located in Hecelchakán outside Campeche. This hacienda was a site of one of the bloodiest battles of the Caste War. Hacienda Santa Cruz is between Campeche and Calkiní in the Nunkiní community. It is dated to the middle of the 18th century established to raise cattle. It continued operating until the Mexican Revolution. Hacienda San José Carpizo is in the Champotón municipality, founded in 1871 by José María Carpizo Sánchez and was one of the most important on the Yucatán Peninsula, raising cattle. It survived the Mexican Revolution until its workers abandoned it in the 1940s. Hacienda San Luis Carpizo is located in Champotón and belonged to José María Carpizo, dedicated to agriculture. This hacienda was restored by the Mexican Army to house the Marine Infantry School in 1999. Hacienda Uayamón is near the city of Campeche with origins in the 16th century. It was attacked and its owner killed in the raid by Laurens de Graaf in 1685. It continued to operate until the Mexican Revolution and today it is home to the Hotel de Gran Turismo. Hacienda Tankuché was dedicated to raising dyewood (palo de tinte) but changed later to henequen. Despite losing most of its land in the Revolution, its henequen mill continued to operate until the 1980s.

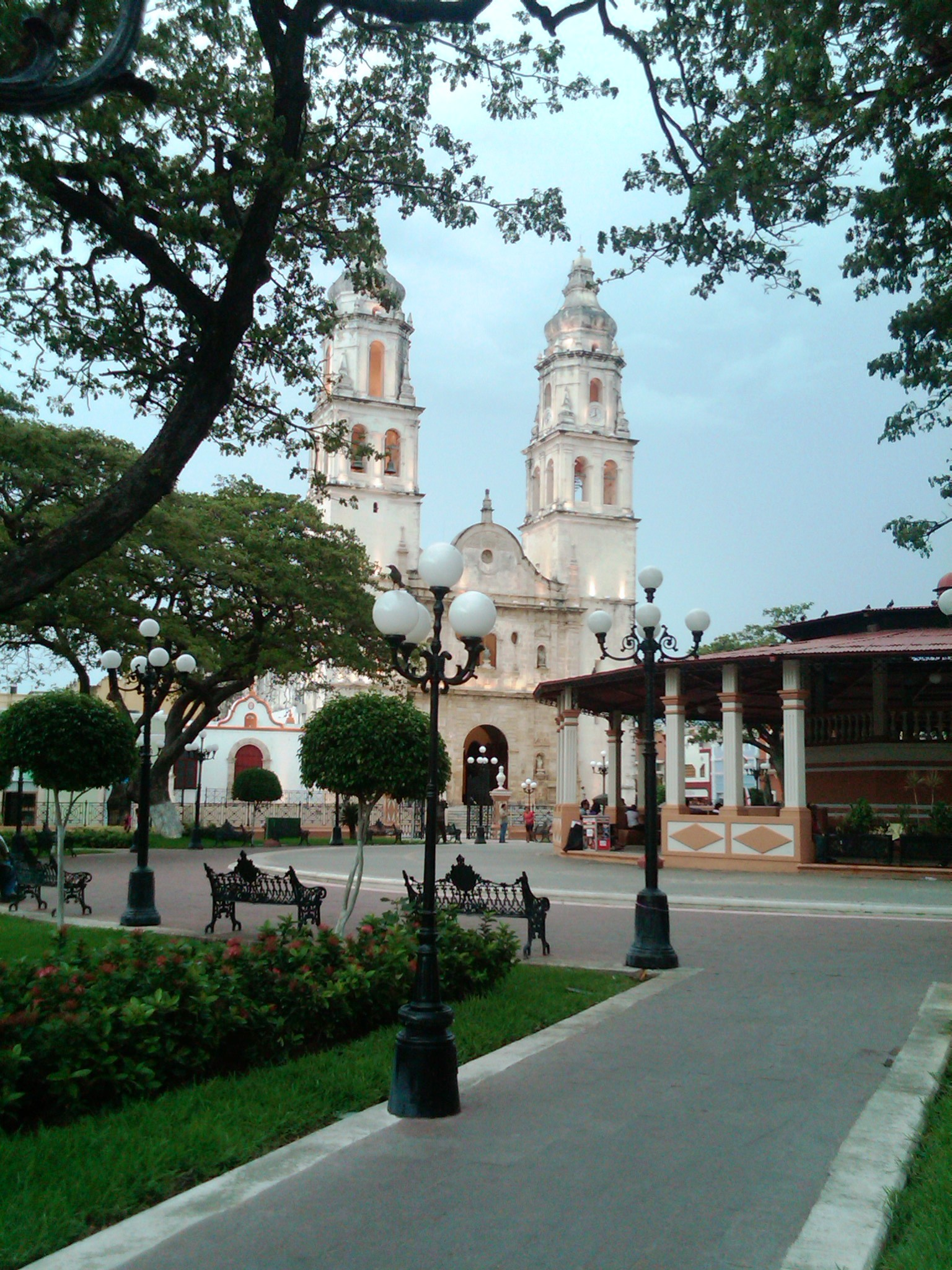
Church in Campeche

Notable museums in the state include the archaeology museum Museo de El Carmen, the Museo de las Estelas Mayas in Ciudad del Carmen and the Camino Real Archaeological Museum in Hecelchakán. The Museo Fuerte de San Miguel is located on one of the Campeche's old forts. The museum is dedicated to the state's history. Opened in 2000, it is the newest and most modern of Campeche's museums.

Most of the beaches frequented by visitors are in the municipalities of Campeche, Champotón and Ciudad del Carmen. In Campeche, these beaches include Mar Azul, San Lorenzo and Playa Bonita. In Ciudad del Carmen, they include La Maniagua, Bahamita, Sabancuy, Playa Caracol and Playa Norte, Isla de Pájaros. In Champotón, they are Acapulquito, Costa Blanca, Payucán and Sihoplaya. In the interior of the state, there are a number of water parks such as El Remate in Tankuché and San Vicente Chuc-Say on a former hacienda of the same name. These generally take advantage of the local rivers, springs and cenotes. Ecotourism includes caves such as Xculhoc, Chuncedro and Xtacumbilxuna'an or Mujer Escondida.

=== Archaeological sites in Campeche ===
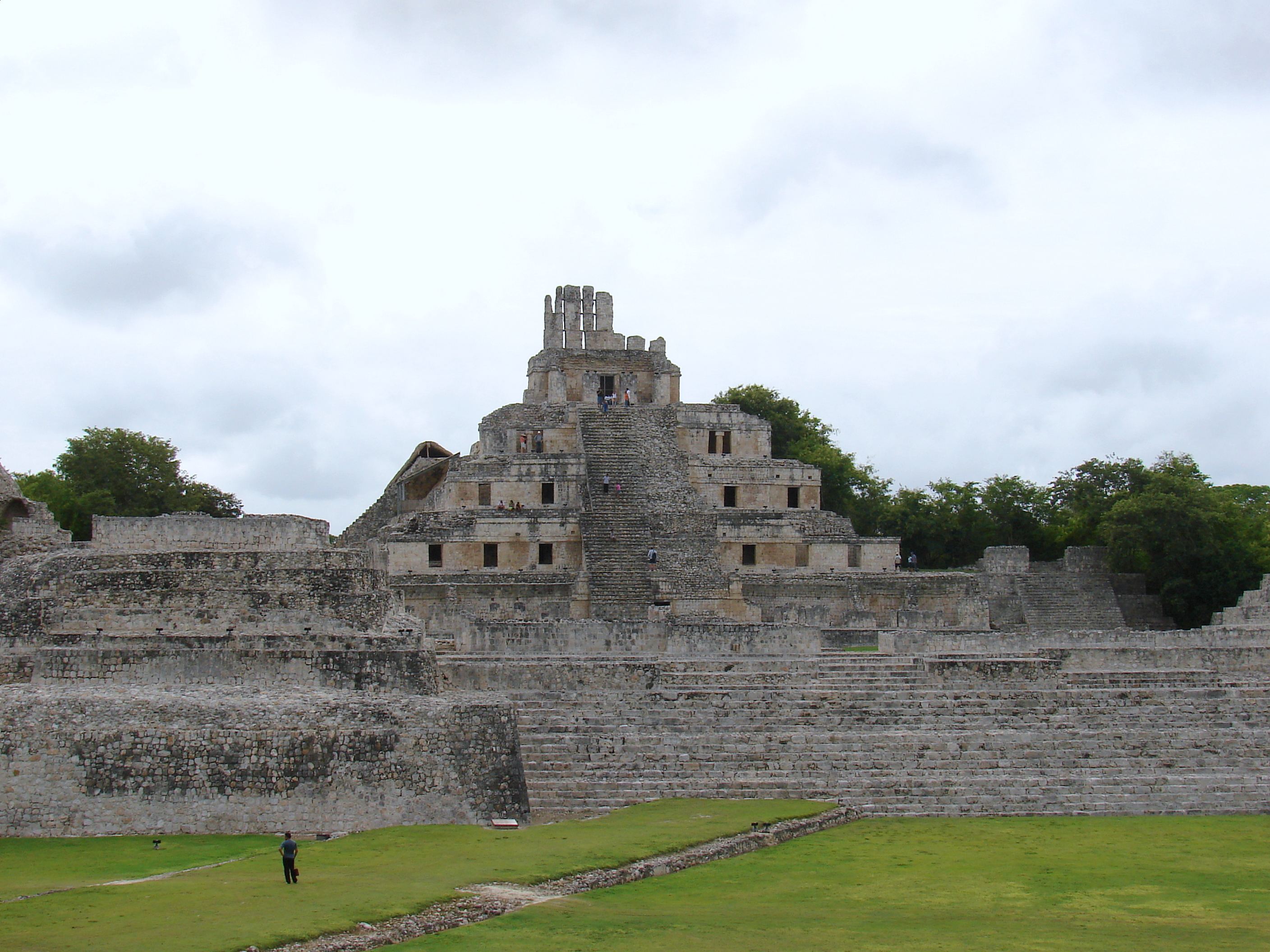
View of the Edzna archaeological site

Much of Campeche's territory is filled with various archaeological sites, almost all of which are Mayan. Maya sites in Campeche include Acanmul, Balamkú, Becán, Bolonchén, Calakmul, Chactún, Chicanná, Chunlimón, Edzná, Isla de Jaina, Lagunita, the Petén Basin, Río Bec, Isla Uaymil, Xculoc, Xpuhil, and Xtampak. These sites are less visited than sites to the east such as Chichen Itza, and Tulum. An early important site is Edzna, located near the city of Campeche in a region known as los Chenes. It was one of the most important ceremonial centers in the pre-Classic Maya period (300–900 CE). Its building show Petén, Chenes and Puuc influence, with a large acropolis surrounded by various temples, the most important of which is the Pyramid of the Five Floors. It was discovered in the 1920s and excavated in the 1940s. It is located away from other Mayan settlements on the peninsula and was probably a collection center for the agriculture products grown in the area, reaching its height between 600 and 900. These were sent to the city of Tikal in exchange for ritualistic adornment for the site. Its most important building is the Pyramid of the Five Stories, built as its name implies. Another important find came in the 1990s. During the planting season in early May, archaeologist Antonio Benavides noticed that the setting sun illuminates a stucco mask hanging one of the pyramid's rooms. The effect also happens in August, during harvest and it is believed to be related to the asking and receiving of abundant crops.

The largest archaeological site in the state is Calakmul, which means "twin heaps" in the Mayan language. It is located in the Petén region built in the late Classic period (500–900 CE). Calakmal is estimated to have been populated around 1000 BCE with its height at around 600 In 695 CE, Calakmul was conquered by Tikal and the city fell into decline. Calakmul is located in the interior rainforest of the state in a biosphere named after it near the Guatemala border. The site extends over 70 km^{2} (27 sq mi) and was one of the largest cities of Mesoamerica. Its temples were mostly dedicated to ancestor worship encircling the palaces of the elite in the center. There are an estimated 6,000 structures at the site with only half a dozen restored. The two most important structures are the twin pyramids of Temple II and Temple VII, similar to structures found at Tikal. Temple II is tallest at 50 m (160 ft) high. The site has been heavily looted by grave robbers.

While most sites are in the interior rainforest of the state, there are 55 archaeological sites on the coast alone, mostly remnants of small villages. The Isla de Jaina is one of the best preserved archaeological sites in the state because of its location on an island on the coast, surrounded by estuaries and mangroves. It requires special permission to visit. Unlike others on the coast, it was a true city. Other sites include Can-mayab-mul in Nunkiní, Xculhoc in Hecelchakán, Chunan-tunich, Xtampak, Hochob, Pak-chén and Dzebilnocac in Hopelchén, El Tigre in Candelaria, La Xoch and Chun Cedro in Tenabo and Becán in Calakmul.

== See also ==
- Petroleum industry in Mexico
- Francisco de Montejo
