= Dzitbalché =

Town in the Mexican state of Campeche

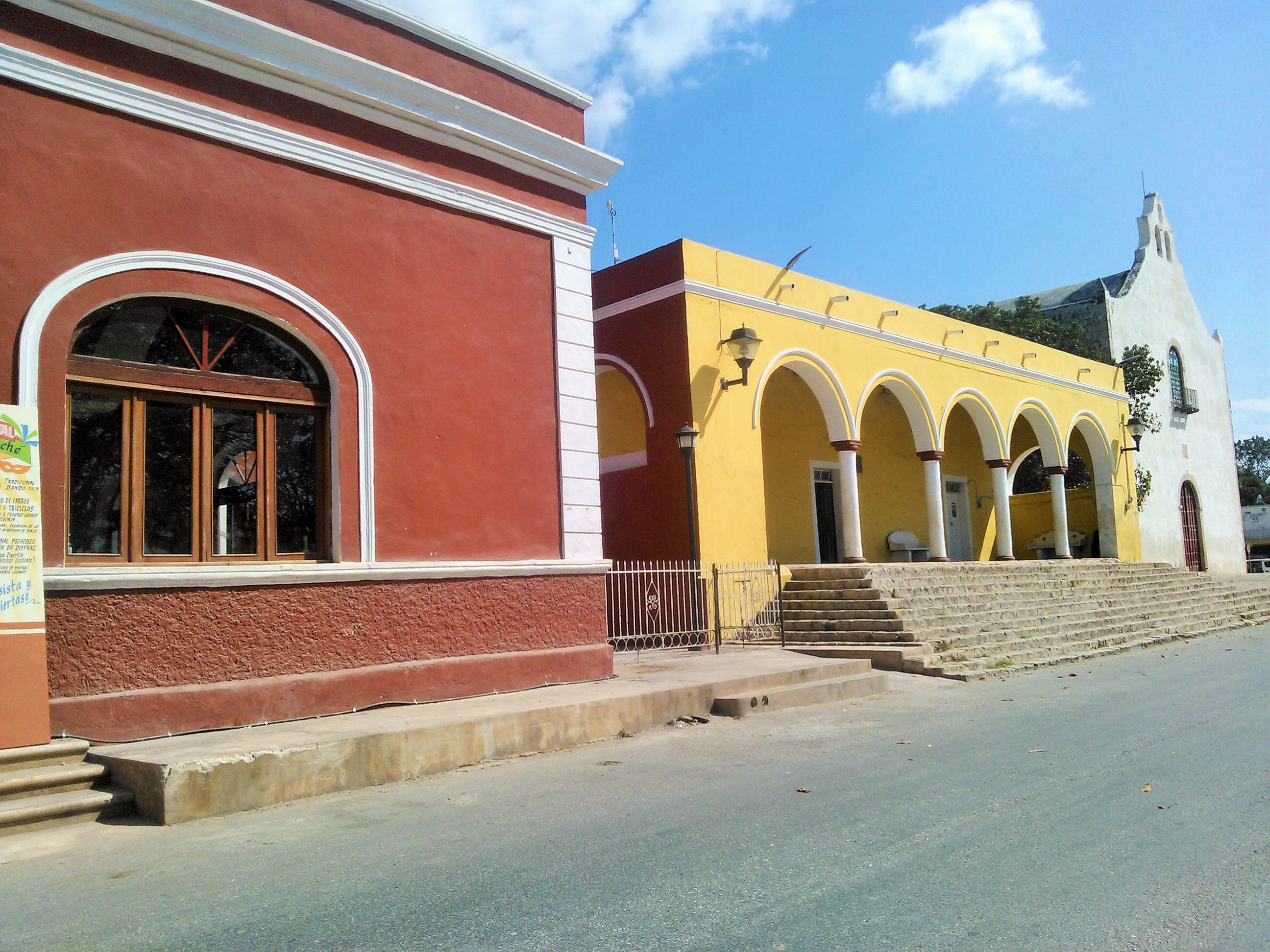

- Location in Mexico Dzitbalché (Mexico)
- Coordinates: 20°19′N 90°03′W
- Country: Mexico
- State: Campeche
- Municipality: Calkiní

Population (2010)
  - Total: 11,686

Dzitbalché (/ˌzɪtbɑːlˈtʃeɪ/) is a large town in the extreme northern part of the Mexican state of Campeche. It is located at 20.32°N 90.05°W and serves as the municipal seat for the municipality of the same name. As of 2010, Dzitbalché had a population of 11,686, up from 10,951 at the 2005 census, making it the sixth-largest community in the state. Before the creation of the municipality of Dzitbalché on 1 January 2021, it was the second-largest community in the municipality of Calkiní.

== Geography ==
=== Climate ===
Climate data for Dzitbalche (1991–2020)
Month	Jan	Feb	Mar	Apr	May	Jun	Jul	Aug	Sep	Oct	Nov	Dec	Year
Record high °C (°F)	42.0 (107.6)	43.0 (109.4)	44.0 (111.2)	43.0 (109.4)	48.0 (118.4)	45.0 (113.0)	42.0 (107.6)	42.0 (107.6)	41.5 (106.7)	42.0 (107.6)	46.0 (114.8)	41.0 (105.8)	48.0 (118.4)
Mean daily maximum °C (°F)	31.6 (88.9)	32.9 (91.2)	34.2 (93.6)	36.4 (97.5)	35.6 (96.1)	34.6 (94.3)	34.6 (94.3)	34.4 (93.9)	33.8 (92.8)	33.1 (91.6)	31.7 (89.1)	31.0 (87.8)	34.5 (94.1)
Daily mean °C (°F)	24.4 (75.9)	25.5 (77.9)	26.9 (80.4)	28.4 (83.1)	28.1 (82.6)	27.9 (82.2)	27.9 (82.2)	27.7 (81.9)	27.4 (81.3)	26.5 (79.7)	25.1 (77.2)	24.6 (76.3)	26.7 (80.1)
Mean daily minimum °C (°F)	17.1 (62.8)	18.1 (64.6)	19.6 (67.3)	20.4 (68.7)	20.5 (68.9)	21.2 (70.2)	21.2 (70.2)	21.1 (70.0)	20.9 (69.6)	20.0 (68.0)	18.5 (65.3)	18.2 (64.8)	19.7 (67.5)
Record low °C (°F)	5.0 (41.0)	5.0 (41.0)	4.0 (39.2)	5.0 (41.0)	10.0 (50.0)	11.0 (51.8)	10.0 (50.0)	7.0 (44.6)	8.0 (46.4)	7.0 (44.6)	7.0 (44.6)	7.0 (44.6)	4.0 (39.2)
Average precipitation mm (inches)	32.8 (1.29)	22.3 (0.88)	17.5 (0.69)	29.3 (1.15)	87.7 (3.45)	187.2 (7.37)	158.6 (6.24)	213.0 (8.39)	217.1 (8.55)	137.1 (5.40)	55.8 (2.20)	39.4 (1.55)	1,197.8 (47.16)
Average precipitation days (≥ 0.1 mm)	3.4	2.6	1.6	2.4	6.3	12.5	12.2	15.2	14.4	10.8	4.7	3.8	89.9
Source: Servicio Meteorologico Nacional

== See also ==
- Songs of Dzitbalche
