= List of Maya sites =

This list of Maya sites is an alphabetical listing of a number of significant archaeological sites associated with the Maya civilization of pre-Columbian Mesoamerica.

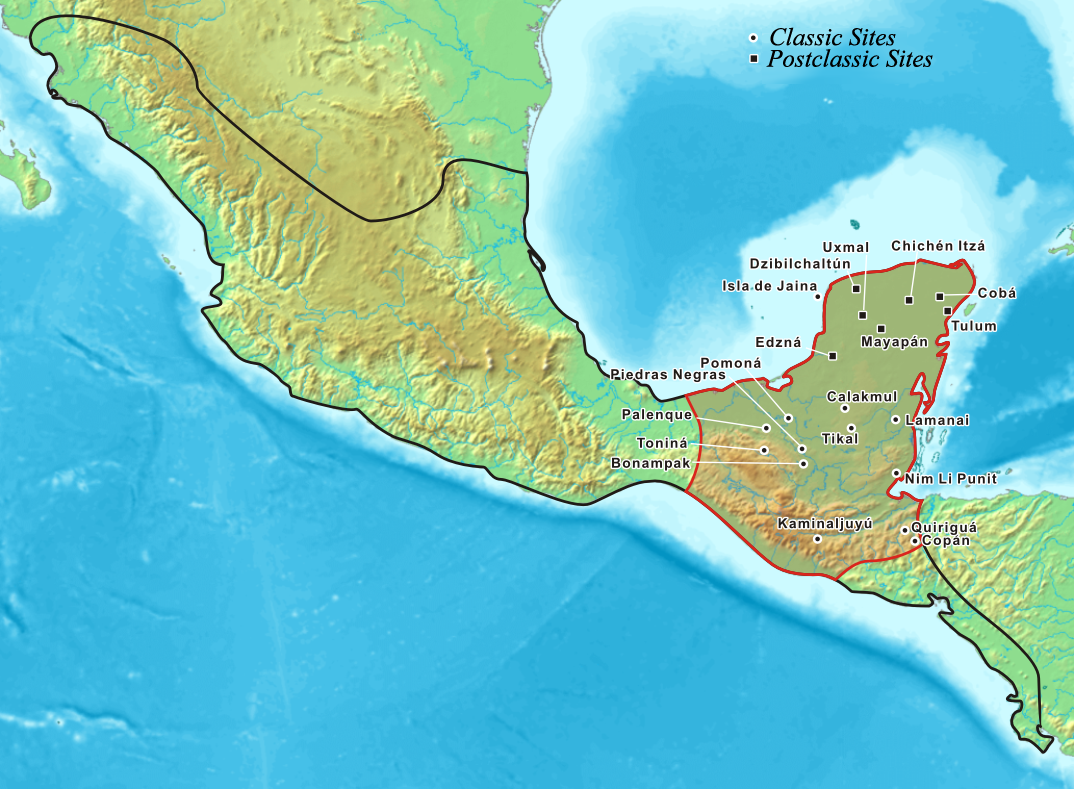
Map depicting the Maya area within the larger Mesoamerican region. View full size for details.

The peoples and cultures which comprised the Maya civilization spanned more than 2,500 years of Mesoamerican history, in the Maya Region of southern Mesoamerica, which incorporates the present-day nations of Guatemala and Belize, much of Honduras and El Salvador, and the southeastern states of Mexico from the Isthmus of Tehuantepec eastwards, including the entire Yucatán Peninsula.

Throughout this region, many hundreds of Maya sites have been documented in at least some form by archaeological surveys and investigations, while the numbers of smaller/uninvestigated (or unknown) sites are so numerous (one study has documented over 4,400 Maya sites) that no complete archaeological list has yet been made. The listing which appears here is necessarily incomplete, however it contains notable sites drawn from several large and ongoing surveys, such as the Corpus of Maya Hieroglyphic Inscriptions (CMHI) and other sources (see References).

Note : Ignore the Spanish definite article "El" or "La" (and their plurals "Los" and "Las") when looking for a site in the alphabetical listing e.g. for El Mirador, look under M rather than E.

== Most important sites ==
Maya sites which are known to have been among the largest and most influential polities through the various eras of Maya history —Formative (or Preclassic), Classic and Postclassic— and/or which have left the most impressive archaeological remains include:

Site	Location	Description	Photo
Aguada Fénix	Tabasco, Mexico	Aguada Fenix is the oldest Mayan city discovered to date, since it was built in 1,000 BC. It was built with earth platforms, something unusual in Mayan architecture. Its main platform measures 3.8 million cubic meters and is the largest ancient monument in the world. Four offerings have been found, and a burial of an individual, and 21 ceremonial centers have been discovered, all facing north–south and in rectangular shape	
El Baúl (Saqb'inya'?)	Escuintla Department, Guatemala	El Baúl, along with the sites of Bilbao and El Castillo, forms the Cotzumalhuapa Nuclear Zone, a large urban area dating to the Late Classic period.	
Becan	Campeche, Mexico	Becan was a major city in the Yucatán Peninsula. It was occupied from about 550 BC, in the Middle Preclassic period and was inhabited through the entire Classic Period, finally being abandoned around the 9th century AD. The site had contact with Teotihuacan in the Early Classic and was fortified with a moat and ramparts.	
Bonampak (Usiij Witz)	Chiapas, Mexico	Bonampak was a Maya state of the Classic Period in the Usumacinta basin, a complex political region where the city faced wars against other major Maya powers like Yaxchilán. The fame of Bonampak comes from the Temple of the Murals which hosts a complete room painted with unique mural paintings showing scenes of ceremony, war and human sacrifice.	
Calakmul (Ox Te' Tuun; Chiik Naab')	Campeche, Mexico	Calakmul was one of the two most important Maya cities in the Classic Period, when its rivalry with Tikal dominated the Maya political landscape. The city was already an important city in the Late Preclassic, with dated monuments being erected up to the beginning of the 10th century AD.	
Caracol (Ox Witz Ha')	Cayo District, Belize	Caracol was an important lowland Maya city, it was already settled in the Late Preclassic but reached its maximum power in the Classic Period when it was first allied with Tikal and later with Calakmul. It played an important role in the downfall of Tikal in the Early Classic and underwent a dramatic expansion in the Late Classic.	
El Ceibal (also known as Seibal) (Tzim?)	Petén Department, Guatemala	Seibal was the largest Classic Period city in the Pasión River region, situated on bluffs overlooking the river. The city experienced a Late Preclassic apogee before declining in the Early Classic and falling under the domination of Dos Pilas in the Late Classic. It survived the collapse of that kingdom to become one of the last cities to survive in the area and was abandoned at the end of the Classic Period.	
Chichen Itza (Uuc Yabnal)	Yucatán, Mexico	Chichen Itza was one of the largest Maya cities and was a major focal point in the northern Maya lowlands from the Late Classic through to the Early Postclassic period and that demonstrated a variety of Maya and non-Maya architectural styles.	
Chunchucmil	Yucatán, Mexico	Chunchucmil was a large site that reached its apogee during the Late to Terminal Classic. The organisation of the city appears to have differed from that of other Maya sites and appears to have been geared towards a specialised coastal trade in salt.	
Coba	Quintana Roo, Mexico	Coba is large site situated among five small lakes on a dry plain. The site is known for a network of 16 causeways linking it to neighbouring sites, the longest of which runs over 100 kilometres (62 mi) west to Yaxuna. The main phase of occupation of the city dates to the Late Classic through to the Early Postclassic, from about AD 700 to 1100.	
Comalcalco (Joy Chan)	Tabasco, Mexico	Comalcalco is a city of the Classic period. It is the only Mayan city built with bricks made of clay and glued with stucco. Three tombs and 14 funerary burials have been found, of which 7 were inside ceramic urn, as well as a pantheon discovered on the outskirts of the city with 116 burials, unique in the Mayan culture.	
Copán (Oxwitik)	Copán Department, Honduras	Copán was the capital city of a major Classic period kingdom from the 5th to 9th centuries AD, when it was closely allied with Tikal. The city was located in the extreme southeast of the Mesoamerican cultural region, on the frontier with the Isthmo-Colombian cultural region, and was almost surrounded by non-Maya peoples. The city is best known for its elaborate sculptural style.	
Dos Pilas (Mutal)	Petén Department, Guatemala	Dos Pilas dates to the Late Classic Period, being founded by an offshoot of the Tikal dynasty in order to control trade routes in the Petexbatún region. It broke away from Tikal and became a vassal of Calakmul. It was a predator state from the beginning and the city gives an important glimpse into the great rivalries and political strife that characterised the Late Classic. Much of the history of Dos Pilas can now be reconstructed, with a level of detail that is almost unparalleled in the Maya area.	
Dzibanche (Kaanu'l)	Quintana Roo, Mexico	Dzibanche was a major Maya city in southern Quintana Roo with monumental structures and the first capital of the Kaan Dynasty, a powerful lineage that conquered and dominated a large territory of the central Mayan lowlands during the Mesoamerican Classic period. The Kaan originated in Dzibanché and later moved their capital to Calakmul, but the city remained as a major power of the Kaan dynasty.	
Dzibilchaltun (Ich Kaan Ti' Ho)	Yucatán, Mexico	Dzibilchaltun was a large and important city in the far north of the Yucatán Peninsula, with its principal architecture dating to the Classic Period, although activity at the site continued into the Late Postclassic when the city's main temple was already in ruins.	
Iximche (Iximche')	Chimaltenango Department, Guatemala	Although short-lived, Iximche was the capital of the Kaqchikel highland kingdom at the time of the Spanish conquest of Guatemala and became the base of operations for the conquest of the highlands and Pacific coast until Spanish demands for tribute caused the Kaqchikels to break off their alliance and rebel. The Spanish then burned Iximche and moved their capital to nearby Tecpán Guatemala until frequent Kaqchikel raids forced them to move their colonial capital to what is now Ciudad Vieja near Antigua Guatemala.	
Ixkun (Julpi')	Petén Department, Guatemala	Ixkun is a large site containing many unrestored mounds and ruins and is the best known archaeological site within the municipality of Dolores. It was the capital of one of the four largest kingdoms in the upper Mopan Valley. Stela 1 at Ixkun is one of the tallest stone monuments in the entire Petén Basin. Although the main period of activity was during the Late Classic Period, the site was occupied from the Late Preclassic right through to the Postclassic Period.	
Kaminaljuyu (Chiih Ka'?)	Guatemala Department, Guatemala	Kaminaljuyu was founded in the Middle Preclassic and emerged as an important city in the Late Preclassic and dominated the entire Maya Highlands. It declined at the end of the Preclassic and was taken over by a new Maya group in the Early Classic with strong contacts with central Mexico. Occupation at Kaminaljuyu extended into the Late Classic.	
Mayapan	Yucatán, Mexico	Mayapan was an important fortified city with a densely occupied area within the city walls. The principal pyramid at Mayapan was modelled after the main pyramid at Chichen Itza. The city was the most important site in Yucatán for a period of about 250 years during the Postclassic Period, with the earliest structures dating to the 12th century AD.	
El Mirador	Petén Department, Guatemala	El Mirador was an enormous Late Preclassic city although construction apparently began in the Middle Preclassic and some level of occupation continued into the Classic Period. The city included some very large triadic pyramids and covered an area similar to that of Classic Period Tikal.	
Moral Reforma	Tabasco, Mexico	Moral Reforma was an important river port that controlled commercial traffic on the San Pedro Mártir River between El Petén and the Gulf of Mexico coast. Because of this, it was highly coveted and fought wars with Calakmul, Tikal, Palenque and Piedras Negras, by whom it was dominated at different times. It had a long occupation, since the year 300 BC. C. until its abandonment in the year 1000 d. C.	
Naachtun (Masuul)	Petén Department, Guatemala	Naachtun is situated in the extreme north of Petén, in a central location between Tikal and Calakmul, the two great Classic Period Maya powers, both of which constantly influenced its politics. The hieroglyphic texts from the site cover almost the whole Classic Period from 504 to 761 AD, although the site inhabited since the Preclassic.	
Nakbe	Petén Department, Guatemala	Nakbe was an important city in the Middle Preclassic, with its principal phase of occupation lasting from about 1000 BC to 400 BC. The city is linked to neighbouring El Mirador by a Late Preclassic causeway. Nakbe appears to possess the earliest examples of Maya masonry architecture and of sacbe causeways.	
Naranjo (Wak Kab'nal)	Petén Department, Guatemala	Naranjo was the capital of a kingdom from the Early Classic through to the Late Classic and formed an important link in the trade routes running from the great city of Tikal to the Caribbean Sea. The earliest dated monuments at the site date to the late 5th century AD. The city became a vassal of Tikal's great rival Calakmul and was involved in a series of devastating wars.	
Oxkintok	Yucatán, Mexico	Oxkintok was one of the first Maya states to develop in the northern lowlands, undergoing a process of rapid development in the Early Classic Period that gave rise to an important capital with inscribed stone monuments. The earliest dated monument dates to the late 5th century AD.	
Palenque (Lakamha')	Chiapas, Mexico	Palenque is located in the foothills of the Chiapas highlands. The city became dominant over the western Maya lowlands during the Late Classic, and engaged in hostilities with its neighbour Toniná that eventually eclipsed it. Hieroglyphic inscriptions at Palenque document a dynastic sequence stretching from the 5th century AD through to the end of the 8th century. The site is best known for the Temple of the Inscriptions, the mortuary shrine containing the tomb of king Kʼinich Janaabʼ Pakal.	
El Peru (Waka')	Petén Department, Guatemala	El Perú was a major Classic Period ally of Calakmul in its wars against Tikal.	
Piedras Negras (Yo'k'ib')	Petén Department, Guatemala	Piedras Negras was the largest city in the region of the Usumacinta River and is known for its excellent quality Late Classic sculpted monuments. These well preserved inscriptions provided the first evidence that Maya texts described historical events. The site has a continuous series of texts running from the 7th century AD through to the 9th century.	
Quiriguá (Ihk' Way Nal)	Izabal Department, Guatemala	Quiriguá is a relatively small site that was founded by Tikal in the Early Classic in order to control the Motagua River trade route, important for the transport of jade and obsidian. Originally a vassal of Copán, the city rebelled and allied itself with Calakmul, after which it erected elaborate monuments in a style similar to that of its former overlord.	
Qʼumarkaj	Quiché Department, Guatemala	Qʼumarkaj (also known as Utatlán) was the Postclassic capital of the Kʼicheʼ Kingdom of Qʼumarkaj at the time of the Spanish Conquest and was one of the most powerful Maya cities at that time, dominating the Guatemalan Highlands.	
San Bartolo	Petén Department, Guatemala	San Bartolo is a remote site in the Guatemalan rainforest and was only discovered in 2001. Most of the structures at the site date to the Late Preclassic and overlie older Middle Preclassic architecture, although the city was reoccupied in the Late Classic. San Bartolo possesses one of the most important Preclassic murals yet found.	
Tikal (Yax Mutal)	Petén Department, Guatemala	Tikal was founded in the Late Preclassic but reached its greatest power in the Late Classic, when most of its great temples were constructed. The site was one of the most powerful kingdoms in Maya history and possesses a dynastic chronology that extends from about AD 100 through to the 9th century. A long-running rivalry between Tikal and Calakmul began in the 6th century, with each of the two cities forming its own network of mutually hostile alliances arrayed against each other in what has been likened to a long-running war between two Maya superpowers.	
Toniná (Popo')	Chiapas, Mexico	Toniná was a major Maya power during the Classic period located in the far regions between the Lowlands and the Highlands where it developed as a huge city-state with a major political and military power, facing wars and victories against other Maya sites, it also had the control of a large commercial route along the Maya region to the Gulf of Mexico. The great pyramid of Toniná with over 75 meters stands as the tallest Maya building and one of the tallest ancient pyramids of the world.	
Tulum (Zama?)	Quintana Roo, Mexico	Tulum is a Late Postclassic site situated on cliffs overlooking the Caribbean Sea and was probably occupied at the time of the Spanish Conquest. It is a small site with architecture in a style similar to that at the bigger cities of Chichen Itza and Mayapan. The site was probably founded to expand the coastal trade routes of the Yucatán Peninsula.	
Uxmal	Yucatán, Mexico	Uxmal was an important capital in the western Yucatán region, demonstrating architecture in the Puuc Maya style. The site reached its apogee in the Late to Terminal Classic from about AD 800–1000 and appears to have declined at the beginning of the Postclassic Period, although the exact length of occupation of the city is unknown.	
Yaxchilan (Pa' Chan)	Chiapas, Mexico	In the Late Classic Period Yaxchilan was one of the most powerful Maya cities along the course of the Usumacinta, with Piedras Negras as its major rival. Architectural styles in subordinate sites in the Usumacinta region demonstrate clear differences that mark a clear boundary between the two kingdoms. Yaxchilan was a large center, important throughout the Classic era, and the dominant power of the Usumacinta River area. It dominated such smaller sites as Bonampak. The site is particularly known for its well-preserved sculptured stone lintels set above the doorways of the main structures.	
Yaxha (Yaxha')	Petén Department, Guatemala	Yaxha was a large city located upon the north shore of the lake of the same name. The city reached its maximum power in the Early Classic, when it was one of the largest capital cities in the Maya region; it was apparently allied with Tikal at that time. By the Late Classic its power had waned, perhaps linked to defeat by Calakmul or its allies.	

== Alphabetical listing ==
=== A ===
Site	Location	Photo
Abaj Takalik (see Takalik Abaj)	Retalhuleu Department, Guatemala	
Acanceh	Yucatán, Mexico	
Acanmul	Campeche, Mexico	
Actun Tunichil Muknal	Cayo District, Belize	
Actuncan	Cayo District, Belize	
El Aguacate	Petén Department, Guatemala	
Aguas Calientes	Petén Department, Guatemala	
Aguateca (K'inich Pa' Witz)	Petén Department, Guatemala	
Ake	Yucatán, Mexico	
Akte	Petén Department, Guatemala	
Almuchil	Campeche, Mexico	
Altar de los Reyes	Campeche, Mexico	
Altar de Sacrificios	Petén Department, Guatemala	
Altun Ha (Yamaan)	Belize District, Belize	
La Amelia	Petén Department, Guatemala	
El Amparo	Chiapas, Mexico	
Anayteʼ	Chiapas, Mexico	
Anonal	Petén Department, Guatemala	
Arroyo de Piedra	Petén Department, Guatemala	

=== B ===
Site	Location	Photo
Baking Pot	Cayo District, Belize	
Bakna	Campeche, Mexico	
Balakbal	Campeche, Mexico	
Balberta	Escuintla Department, Guatemala	
Balamku	Campeche, Mexico	
Balamtun	Petén Department, Guatemala	
Balankanche	Yucatán, Mexico	
El Baúl	Escuintla Department, Guatemala	
Becan	Campeche, Mexico	
Bejucal	Petén Department, Guatemala	
Bellote	Tabasco, Mexico	
Blackman Eddy	Cayo District, Belize	
La Blanca, Peten	Petén Department, Guatemala	
Bolonchen	Campeche, Mexico	
Bolonkin	Chiapas, Mexico	
Bonampak (Usiij Witz')	Chiapas, Mexico	
Budsilha	Chiapas, Mexico	
Buena Vista	Petén Department, Guatemala	

=== C ===
Site	Location	Photo
Cahal Pech	Cayo District, Belize	
Calakmul (Chik(u) Naahb')	Campeche, Mexico	
Campeche	Campeche, Mexico	
Canancax	Chiapas, Mexico	
Cancuen (Yahk K'in)	Petén Department, Guatemala	
Candzibaantun	Campeche, Mexico	
Cansacbe	Campeche, Mexico	
Caracol (Ox/Uhx Witz Ha')	Cayo District, Belize	
El Caribe	Petén Department, Guatemala	
Casa Blanca	Santa Ana Department, El Salvador	
El Cayo	Chiapas, Mexico	
Cenotillo	Yucatán, Mexico	
Los Cerritos-Chijoj	Quiché Department, Guatemala	
Cerro Quiac	Quetzaltenango Department, Guatemala	
Cerros	Corozal District, Belize	
Chac II	Yucatán, Mexico	
Chacchoben	Quintana Roo, Mexico	
Chacmultun	Yucatán, Mexico	
Chactún	Campeche, Mexico	
Chakalal	Quintana Roo, Mexico	
Chakanbakan	Quintana Roo, Mexico	
Chakjobon	Campeche, Mexico	
Chakokot	Petén Department, Guatemala	
El Chal	Petén Department, Guatemala	
Chamax	Quintana Roo, Mexico	
Chancala	Chiapas, Mexico	
Chapayal	Petén Department, Guatemala	
Cheyokolnah	Campeche, Mexico	
Chiapa de Corzo	Chiapas, Mexico	
Chicanna	Campeche, Mexico	
Chicaanticaanal	Campeche, Mexico	
Chichen Itza	Yucatán, Mexico	
Chichmul	Yucatán, Mexico	
El Chicozapote	Petén Department, Guatemala	
Chinaha		
Chinikiha	Chiapas, Mexico	
Chinkultic (Chan)	Chiapas, Mexico	
Chitinamit	Quiché Department, Guatemala	
Chocolá	Suchitepéquez Department, Guatemala	
Chojolom	Quetzaltenango Department, Guatemala	
El Chorro	Petén Department, Guatemala	
Chuctiepa	Chiapas, Mexico	
Chunchucmil	Yucatán, Mexico	
Chunhuhub	Campeche, Mexico	
Chunhuitz	Petén Department, Guatemala	
Chunlimon	Campeche, Mexico	
Chutixtiox	Quiché Department, Guatemala	
Cihuatán	San Salvador Department, El Salvador	
Cival	Petén Department, Guatemala	
Civiltuk		
Coba	Quintana Roo, Mexico	
Comitán	Chiapas, Mexico	
Consacbe		
Copán (Oxwitik / Xukpi)	Copán Department, Honduras	
La Corona (The enigmatic "Site Q") (Sak Nikte')	Petén Department, Guatemala	
Corozal	Corozal District, Belize	
Cozumel	Quintana Roo, Mexico	
Cuca	Yucatán, Mexico	
Cuello	Orange Walk District, Belize	

=== D ===
Site	Location	Photo
Dos Pilas	Petén Department, Guatemala	
Dzehkabtun	Campeche, Mexico	
Dzekilna	Yucatán, Mexico	
Dzibanche	Quintana Roo, Mexico	
Dzibilchaltun	Yucatán, Mexico	
Dzibilnocac	Campeche, Mexico	
Dzibiltun	Campeche, Mexico	
Dzilam	Yucatán, Mexico	
Dzitbalché	Campeche, Mexico	
Dzula	Quintana Roo, Mexico	

=== E ===
Site	Location	Photo
Edzna	Campeche, Mexico	
Ekʼ Balam (Talol)	Yucatán, Mexico	
Ekab (modern Cancun)	Quintana Roo, Mexico	
El Encanto (Chiapas)	Chiapas, Mexico	
El Encanto (Petén)	Petén Department, Guatemala	
Colonia La Esperanza	Chiapas, Mexico	

=== F ===
Site	Location	Photo
La Florida (Namaan)	Petén Department, Guatemala	
Flores (see Nojpetén)	Petén Department, Guatemala	

=== G ===
Site	Location	Photo
Golontón	Chiapas, Mexico	
Guaquitepec	Chiapas, Mexico	
Gumarcaj	Quiché Department, Guatemala	

=== H ===
Site	Location	Photo
Ha K'in Na	Chiapas, Mexico	
Hacienda Hotzuc	Yucatán, Mexico	
Halakal	Yucatán, Mexico	
Halal	Yucatán, Mexico	
Haltunchon	Campeche, Mexico	
Los Higos	Copán Department, Honduras	
Hochob	Campeche, Mexico	
Holactun	Campeche, Mexico	
Holmul	Petén Department, Guatemala	
La Honradez	Petén Department, Guatemala	
Holtun	Petén Department, Guatemala	
Los Horcones	Chiapas, Mexico	
Hormiguero	Campeche, Mexico	
Huacutal	Petén Department, Guatemala	
Huitzinchá	Yucatán, Mexico	
Huntichmul	Yucatán, Mexico	
Huntichmul II	Campeche, Mexico	

=== I ===
Site	Location	Photo
Ichkabal	Quintana Roo, Mexico	
Ichmac	Campeche, Mexico	
Ichmul	Yucatán, Mexico	
Ichpaatun	Quintana Roo, Mexico	
Ichpich	Campeche, Mexico	
Ikil (Maya site)	Yucatán, Mexico	
Itsimte-Sacluk ('Ibil)	Petén Department, Guatemala	
Itzamkanac (El Tigre)	Campeche, Mexico	
Itzan	Petén Department, Guatemala	
Itzantun	Chiapas, Mexico	
Itzimte-Bolonchen (see Bolonchen)	Campeche, Mexico	
Ixcan	Chiapas, Mexico	
Ixil	Yucatán, Mexico	
Iximche	Chimaltenango Department, Guatemala	
Ixkun (Julpi)	Petén Department, Guatemala	
Ixlu (Saklamakhal)	Petén Department, Guatemala	
Ixtelha	Chiapas, Mexico	
Ixtonton (Ho’kab')	Petén Department, Guatemala	
Ixtutz (Ho’kab')	Petén Department, Guatemala	
Izamal (Ti Ho)	Yucatán, Mexico	
Izapa	Chiapas, Mexico	

=== J ===
Site	Location	Photo
Jacawitz (see Chitinamit)	Quiché Department, Guatemala	
Jaina Island	Campeche, Mexico	
Jimbal	Petén Department, Guatemala	
Joljaʼ	Chiapas, Mexico	
Jonuta	Tabasco, Mexico	
Joya de Cerén	La Libertad Department, El Salvador	
La Joyanca	Petén Department, Guatemala	
Junchavin	Chiapas, Mexico	

=== K ===
Site	Location	Photo
Kabah	Yucatán, Mexico	
Kahaltun	Campeche, Mexico	
Kajtún	Campeche, Mexico	
Kalakmul (see Calakmul)	Campeche, Mexico	
Kaminaljuyu	Guatemala Department, Guatemala	
Kana	Quintana Roo, Mexico	
Kanaku	Campeche, Mexico	
Kanki	Campeche, Mexico	
Kantunil Kin	Quintana Roo, Mexico	
Kaxuinic	Orange Walk District, Belize	
Kayal	Campeche, Mexico	
Kichpampak	Campeche, Mexico	
Kinal	Petén Department, Guatemala	
Kiuic	Yucatán, Mexico	
Kohunlich	Quintana Roo, Mexico	
Komchen	Yucatán, Mexico	
Kʼatepan	Huehuetenango Department, Guatemala	
Kulubá	Yucatán, Mexico	
Kumché Pich	Yucatán, Mexico	

=== L ===
Site	Location	Photo
Labna	Yucatán, Mexico	
Lacanha	Chiapas, Mexico	
El Lagartero	Chiapas, Mexico	
Laguna Perdida	Petén Department, Guatemala	
Lagunita	Campeche, Mexico	
Lakin Kah	Quintana Roo, Mexico	
Lamanai	Orange Walk District, Belize	
Lashtunich	Petén Department, Guatemala	
Limones	Quintana Roo, Mexico	
Loltun	Yucatán, Mexico	
López Mateos	Chiapas, Mexico	
Louisville	Corozal District, Belize	
Lubaantun	Toledo District, Belize	

=== M ===
Site	Location	Photo
Machaquila (Sutiij?)	Petén Department, Guatemala	
Managua (Maya site)	Campeche, Mexico	
Maní	Yucatán, Mexico	
La Mar	Chiapas, Mexico	
Mario Ancona	Quintana Roo, Mexico	
Maudsley	Chiapas, Mexico	
Maxcanu	Yucatán, Mexico	
Mayapan	Yucatán, Mexico	
El Meco	Quintana Roo, Mexico	
La Milpa	Orange Walk District, Belize	
Minanha	Cayo District, Belize	
El Mirador	Petén Department, Guatemala	
Miraflores	Chiapas, Mexico	
Mixco Viejo (also known as Jilotepeque Viejo) (Chuwa Nima Ab'aj)	Chimaltenango Department, Guatemala	
Monte Alto	Escuintla Department, Guatemala	
La Montura	Petén Department, Guatemala	
Mopila	Yucatán, Mexico	
Moral Reforma	Tabasco, Mexico	
Motul de San José (Ika')	Petén Department, Guatemala	
Mountain Cow	Cayo District, Belize	
Moxviquil	Chiapas, Mexico	
La Muerta	Petén Department, Guatemala	
Mucaancah	Campeche, Mexico	
Mukana	Chiapas, Mexico	
Mulchic	Yucatán, Mexico	
Mulen Kakaw	Yucatán, Mexico	
Muluch Tsekal	Yucatán, Mexico	
La Muñeca	Campeche, Mexico	
Muxculha	Chiapas, Mexico	
Muyil	Quintana Roo, Mexico	
Mirador (Mesoamerican Site)	Chiapas, Mexico	

=== N ===
Site	Location	Photo
Naachtun	Petén Department, Guatemala	
Nachoj	Chiapas, Mexico	
Nadzbeiltun	Campeche, Mexico	
Nadzca'an	Campeche, Mexico	
Naj Tunich	Petén Department, Guatemala	
Nakbe	Petén Department, Guatemala	
Nakeb	Yucatán, Mexico	
Nakum	Petén Department, Guatemala	
Naox	Campeche, Mexico	
Naranjo	Petén Department, Guatemala	
Natentsun	Chiapas, Mexico	
La Naya	Petén Department, Guatemala	
Nebaj	Quiché Department, Guatemala	
Nicolás Bravo	Quintana Roo, Mexico	
Nim Li Punit	Toledo District, Belize	
Nocuchich	Campeche, Mexico	
Noh Kah	Quintana Roo, Mexico	
Noh K'uh	Chiapas, Mexico	
Nohmul	Orange Walk District, Belize	
Nohpat	Yucatán, Mexico	
Nuevo Jalisco	Chiapas, Mexico	
Nututun	Chiapas, Mexico	

=== O ===
Site	Location	Photo
Ocomtún	Campeche, Mexico	
Ojo de Agua	Campeche, Mexico	
Okop	Quintana Roo, Mexico	
Oxcutzcab	Yucatán, Mexico	
Oxkintok	Yucatán, Mexico	
Oxlahuntun	Chiapas, Mexico	
Oxpemul	Campeche, Mexico	
Oxtankah	Quintana Roo, Mexico	

=== P ===
Site	Location	Photo
El Pabellón	Chiapas, Mexico	
Padre Piedra	Chiapas, Mexico	
Pajaral	Petén Department, Guatemala	
Palenque	Chiapas, Mexico	
El Palma	Chiapas, Mexico	
El Palmar	Campeche, Mexico	
Panhale	Tabasco, Mexico	
Pantaleón	Escuintla Department, Guatemala	
El Paraíso (Maya site)	Copán Department, Honduras	
El Parajal	Petén Department, Guatemala	
La Pasadita	Petén Department, Guatemala	
Pasión del Cristo	Quintana Roo, Mexico	
El Pato	Petén Department, Guatemala	
Pechal	Campeche, Mexico	
El Perú (Waka')	Petén Department, Guatemala	
Pestac	Chiapas, Mexico	
Pie de Gallo	Petén Department, Guatemala	
Piedra Labrada	Chiapas, Mexico	
Piedras Negras	Petén Department, Guatemala	
El Pilar	Jointly in Cayo District, Belize and Petén Department, Guatemala	
Pixoy	Campeche, Mexico	
Plan de Ayutla (Ake'?)	Chiapas, Mexico	
La Pochitoca	Petén Department, Guatemala	
Pol Box	Quintana Roo, Mexico	
Polol	Petén Department, Guatemala	
Pomona, Belize	Stann Creek District, Belize	
Pomona, Tabasco	Tabasco, Mexico	
Pomuch	Campeche, Mexico	
El Portón	Baja Verapaz Department, Guatemala	
El Porvenir	Petén Department, Guatemala	
El Puente	Copán Department, Honduras	
Punta de Chimino	Petén Department, Guatemala	
Pusilha (Uun)	Toledo District, Belize	

=== Q ===
Site	Location	Photo
"Site Q" (see La Corona)	Petén Department, Guatemala	
Quen Santo	Huehuetenango Department, Guatemala	
Quexil	Chiapas, Mexico	
Quiriguá (Ihk' Way Nal)	Izabal Department, Guatemala	
Qʼumarkaj	Quiché Department, Guatemala	

=== R ===
Site	Location	Photo
El Rastrojón (K'an Koj Witz?)	Copán, Honduras	
El Resbalón	Quintana Roo, Mexico	
El Retiro	Chiapas, Mexico	
El Rey	Quintana Roo, Mexico	
Río Amarillo	Copán Department, Honduras	
Río Azul	Petén Department, Guatemala	
Río Bec	Campeche, Mexico	
Río Michol	Chiapas, Mexico	
El Rosal (Maya site)		

=== S ===
Site	Location	Photo
Sabacche	Yucatán, Mexico	
Sacchana	Chiapas, Mexico	
Sacnicte	Yucatán, Mexico	
Sacul (Juluup)	Petén Department, Guatemala	
Salinas de los Nueve Cerros (Bolontewitz)	Alta Verapaz Department, Guatemala	
San Andrés	La Libertad Department, El Salvador	
San Bartolo	Petén Department, Guatemala	
San Claudio	Tabasco, Mexico	
San Clemente	Petén Department, Guatemala	
San Diego	Petén Department, Guatemala	
San Gervasio	Quintana Roo, Mexico	
San Lorenzo (Campeche)	Campeche, Mexico	
San Lorenzo (Chiapas)	Chiapas, Mexico	
San Mateo Ixtatán	Huehuetenango Department, Guatemala	
San Pedro (Dzitbalche)	Campeche, Mexico	
Santa Elena Poco Uinic	Chiapas, Mexico	
Santa Rita, Corozal	Corozal District, Belize	
Santa Rosa Xtampak	Campeche, Mexico	
Santoton	Chiapas, Mexico	
Sasilhá	Campeche, Mexico	
Sayil	Yucatán, Mexico	
Seibal (Tzim?)	Petén Department, Guatemala	
Sihó	Yucatán, Mexico	
Silvituc	Campeche, Mexico	
Simojovel	Chiapas, Mexico	
Sisilha	Campeche, Mexico	
La Sufricaya	Petén Department, Guatemala	

=== T ===
Site	Location	Photo
Tabi	Yucatán, Mexico	
El Tabasqueño	Campeche, Mexico	
Takalik Abaj	Retalhuleu Department, Guatemala	
Tamarindito (Yahx O’mu’l Nal)	Petén Department, Guatemala	
Tamchen	Campeche, Mexico	
Tancah	Quintana Roo, Mexico	
Tayasal (Tah Itza' / Noj Petén)	Petén Department, Guatemala	
Tazumal	Santa Ana Department, El Salvador	
Taxaha	Campeche, Mexico	
Techoh	Yucatán, Mexico	
Telantunich	Quintana Roo, Mexico	
Teleman	Alta Verapaz Department, Guatemala	
El Temblor	Petén Department, Guatemala	
Tenam Puente	Chiapas, Mexico	
Tenam Rosario	Chiapas, Mexico	
Tikal	Peten Department, Guatemala	
Tila	Chiapas, Mexico	
El Tintal	Petén Department, Guatemala	
Tohcok	Campeche, Mexico	
Tonalá	Chiapas, Mexico	
Toniná	Chiapas, Mexico	
Topoxté (Chak Yam? Nal)	Petén Department, Guatemala	
Tortuguero	Tabasco, Mexico	
Tres Islas	Petén Department, Guatemala	
La Trinidad de Nosotros	Petén Department, Guatemala	
Tulum	Quintana Roo, Mexico	
Tunkuyi	Campeche, Mexico	
Tzendales	Chiapas, Mexico	
Tzibanche	Quintana Roo, Mexico	
Tzocchen	Campeche, Mexico	
Tzum	Campeche, Mexico	

=== U ===
Site	Location	Photo
Uaxactun (K'an Witz/K'an Kok)	Petén Department, Guatemala	
Uaymil	Campeche, Mexico	
Ucanal (K'an Witz Nal)	Petén Department, Guatemala	
Uci	Yucatán, Mexico	
Uitzina	Yucatán, Mexico	
Ukum	Yucatán, Mexico	
La Unión	Quintana Roo, Mexico	
Uolantun	Petén Department, Guatemala	
Utatlan (see Qʼumarkaj)	Quiché Department, Guatemala	
Uxbenka	Toledo District, Belize	
Uxmal	Yucatán, Mexico	
Uxul	Campeche, Mexico	

=== V ===
Site	Location	Photo
Valeriana	Campeche, Mexico	

=== W ===
Site	Location	Photo
Wakaʼ (see El Perú)	Petén Department, Guatemala	
Waxaktun (see Uaxactun)	Petén Department, Guatemala	
Witzna	Petén Department, Guatemala	
Wolonchan	Chiapas, Mexico	

=== X ===
Site	Location	Photo
Xbaatun	Yucatán, Mexico	
Xbalche	Yucatan, Mexico	
Xcalumkin	Campeche, Mexico	
Xcambo	Yucatán, Mexico	
Xcaret	Quintana Roo, Mexico	
X'Castillo	Yucatán, Mexico	
Xcocha	Campeche, Mexico	
Xcochkax	Campeche, Mexico	
Xcorralche	Yucatán, Mexico	
Xcucsuc	Campeche, Mexico	
Xculoc	Campeche, Mexico	
Xelha	Quintana Roo, Mexico	
Xicalango	Campeche, Mexico	
Xkalachetzimin	Campeche, Mexico	
Xkamayamul	Campeche, Mexico	
Xkampechhaltun	Yucatán, Mexico	
Xkichmook	Yucatán, Mexico	
Xkipche	Yucatán, Mexico	
Xkombec	Campeche, Mexico	
Xkukican	Yucatán, Mexico	
Xlapak	Yucatán, Mexico	
Xmakabatun	Petén Department, Guatemala	
Xnaheb	Toledo District, Belize	
Xnucbec	Campeche, Mexico	
Xpambehaltun	Campeche, Mexico	
Xpuhil	Campeche, Mexico	
Xtablakal	Yucatán, Mexico	
Xtampak (also known as Santa Rosa Xtampak)	Campeche, Mexico	
Xtobo	Yucatán, Mexico	
Xuelén	Campeche, Mexico	
Xul	Yucatán, Mexico	
Xul-Há	Quintana Roo, Mexico	
Xultun (Baax Witz)	Petén Department, Guatemala	
Xunantunich (Katyaatz Witz)	Cayo District, Belize	
Xupa	Chiapas, Mexico	
Xutilha	Petén Department, Guatemala	
Xutixtiox (see Chutixtiox)	Quiché Department, Guatemala	

=== Y ===
Site	Location	Photo
Yaaxhom	Yucatán, Mexico	
Yakalmai	Campeche, Mexico	
Yalbac	Belize	
Yalcabakal	Campeche, Mexico	
Yaltutud	Petén Department, Guatemala	
Yatoch Ku	Chiapas, Mexico	
Yaxche Ku	Yucatán, Mexico	
Yaxche-Xlabpak	Campeche, Mexico	
Yaxchilan	Chiapas, Mexico	
Yaxcopoil	Yucatán, Mexico	
Yaxha	Petén Department, Guatemala	
Yaxnohcah	Campeche, Mexico	
Yaxún	Chiapas, Mexico	
Yaxuna	Yucatán, Mexico	
Yoʼokop	Quintana Roo, Mexico	
Yoxiha	Chiapas, Mexico	
Yula	Yucatán, Mexico	

=== Z ===
Site	Location	Photo
Zacpeten	Petén Department, Guatemala	
Zaculeu	Huehuetenango Department, Guatemala	
El Zapote	Petén Department, Guatemala	
Zapote Bobal (Hix Witz)	Petén Department, Guatemala	
El Zotz (original Mayan name PaʼChan)	Petén Department, Guatemala	

== See also ==
- Degradation of Mayan archeological sites
- List of Mesoamerican pyramids
- Maya architecture
- Maya ruins of Belize
