= Valeriana (archaeological site) =

Ancient Maya city in Campeche, Mexico

- Approximate location of the site Valeriana (archaeological site) (Campeche)
- 18°54′09″N 89°19′03″W
- Periods: Late Preclassic to Late Classic
- Cultures: Maya civilization
- Location: Campeche, Mexico

Site notes
- Discovered: 2024

Valeriana is a Maya archaeological site in the Mexican state of Campeche in the tropical rainforest jungle near its eastern border with the state of Quintana Roo. Its discovery was announced in October 2024. The site was named after an adjacent lake.

== Description ==
The city layout pattern and architecture of Valeriana matches that of the Chactún-Tamchen area to the southeast of the site. The city contains multiple plazas, temple pyramids, a ballgame court, and a dammed reservoir. All these elements are indicative of a Maya political capital. Researchers estimate that the site contains more than 6,500 structures. The site covers approximately 120 square kilometres (47 sq mi).

Particular architectural features known as an "E-Group assemblage" indicate the founding date as being earlier than 150 AD (in the Late Preclassic period), and the city probably flourished during the Classic period of Maya civilization (c. 250 – c. 900 AD). The researchers consider the density of building clusters in Valeriana to be second only to Calakmul. They estimate a human population of between 30,000 and 50,000 during the cultural peak of the city, from 750 to 850 AD. Additionally, researchers believe that Valeriana's social structure and urban density may indicate a highly diverse, organised society in which its residents regularly interacted with their rural neighbours.

== Discovery ==
Researchers have known since the 1970s that the area around Xpujil was densely populated and engineered during the Classic period of Maya civilization, yet archaeological examinations of the area have been scarce due to the density of the forest.

In 2024, the site was discovered by researchers from Northern Arizona University, Tulane University, the National Center for Airborne Laser Mapping at the University of Houston, and Mexico's National Institute of Anthropology and History (INAH). Lidar data was used because Lidar produces high resolution terrain data through forest cover, and the technology has been used to discover other unknown Maya sites in the past. However, it being expensive, these researchers used preexisting Lidar data from a 2013 forest monitoring project by the Mexican branch of The Nature Conservancy. The researchers plan further fieldwork, describing the ruins as "hidden in plain sight" only a 15-minute walk from Federal Highway 186 near Xpujil and cultivated farmland.

The researchers named the site "Valeriana", after a nearby lake named Laguna la Valeriana.

== See also ==
- List of Maya sites
