= Tohcok =

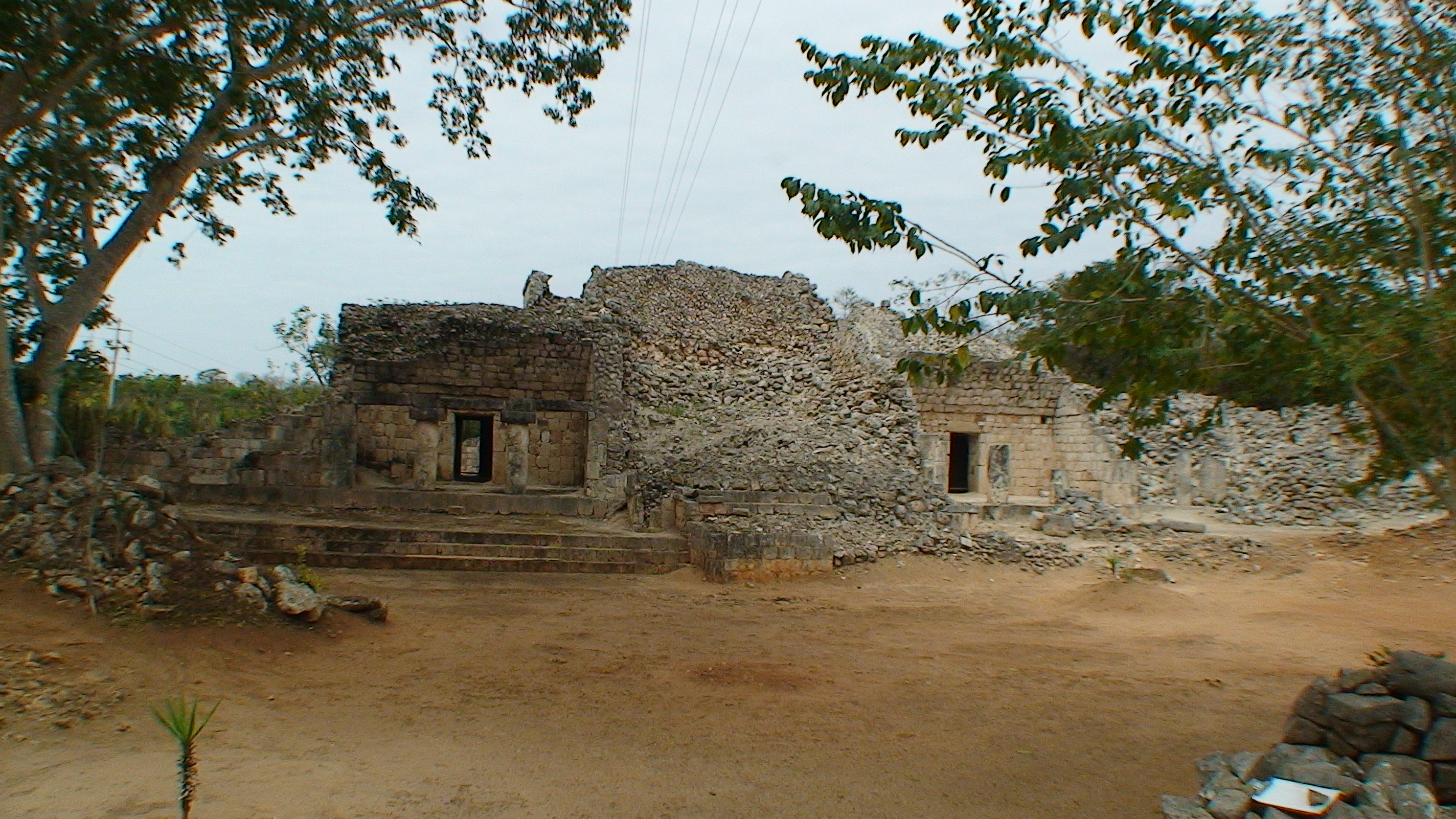
- Structure 2 of Tohcok
- Interactive map of Tohcok
- Type: Ancient Maya site
- Periods: Classic - Postclassic
- Cultures: Maya civilization
- Location: Mexico
- Region: Puuc and Chenes

History
- Built: 600 AD
- Abandoned: 1200 AD

Site notes
- Architectural styles: Puuc and Chenes

Tohcok (also known as Tacóh or Tacoc) is an archaeological Maya site in the Hopelchén municipality of the Mexican state of Campeche. Tohcok developed as a large ceremonial center during the late Classic and early Postclassic periods of Mesoamerica between the Puuc and Chenes region. This location in the transition zone of both regions makes Tohcok show a mix of both regional architectural styles in its buildings and structures.

== Location ==
Tohcok is located at approximately 10 km from the city of Hopelchén in the state of Campeche, near the Federal Highway 261 that connects Hopelchén to the city of Campeche. Other Maya sites near Tohcok are Xtampak, Bakna, Dzehkabtun and the Xtacumbilxunaan caves.

== Architecture ==
The architecture of Tohcok has some elements of the Puuc region architectural style mixed with features of the Chenes region style due to the location of the site in the transition zone between both Mayan historical regions. The accessible archaeological zone consists of two buildings, the structure 1 and 2 and a large plaza. The explored ruins of Tohcok are only a small part of the extension that the site managed to reach during its development.
