= Tenam Rosario =

Maya site in Chiapas, Mexico

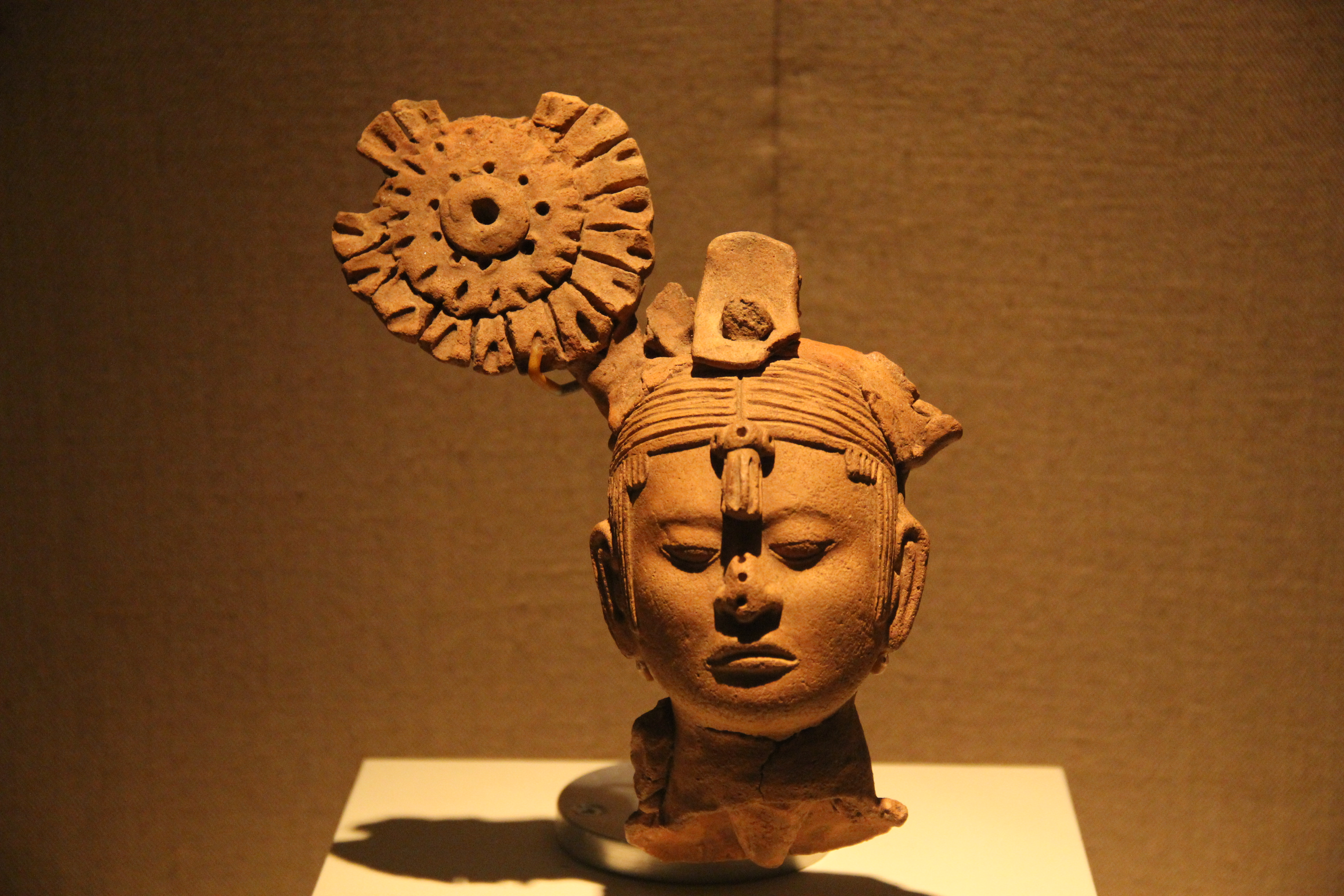
- Sculpture with headdress found at Tenam Rosario.

- Location within Mexico Location within Chiapas
- Type: Ancient Maya city
- Periods: Classic - Early Postclassic
- Cultures: Maya civilization
- Location: Mexico
- Region: Eastern Chiapas Highlands

Site notes
- Architectural style: Eastern Chiapas Highlands

Tenam Rosario is an archaeological Maya site located in La Trinitaria municipality of southern Chiapas, Mexico. It was the capital of a Maya state of the Eastern Chiapas Highlands, the site developed as a major political and ceremonial center. It had its peak in the late Classic period between the years 700 and 950 AD and had great activity until the early postclassic period of the Maya civilization.

Tenam Rosario is a very large site and includes numerous ceremonial and residential structures, ball courts and pyramids. Numerous ceramic sculptures, stelae, stone discs, and six large ballcourt markers carved with Maya mythology representations have been found in the site. Tenam Rosario was first discovered and described in early 1920 by archaeologist Frans Blom in his report of an archaeological expedition in southern Chiapas. Most of the structures are buried in the jungle.

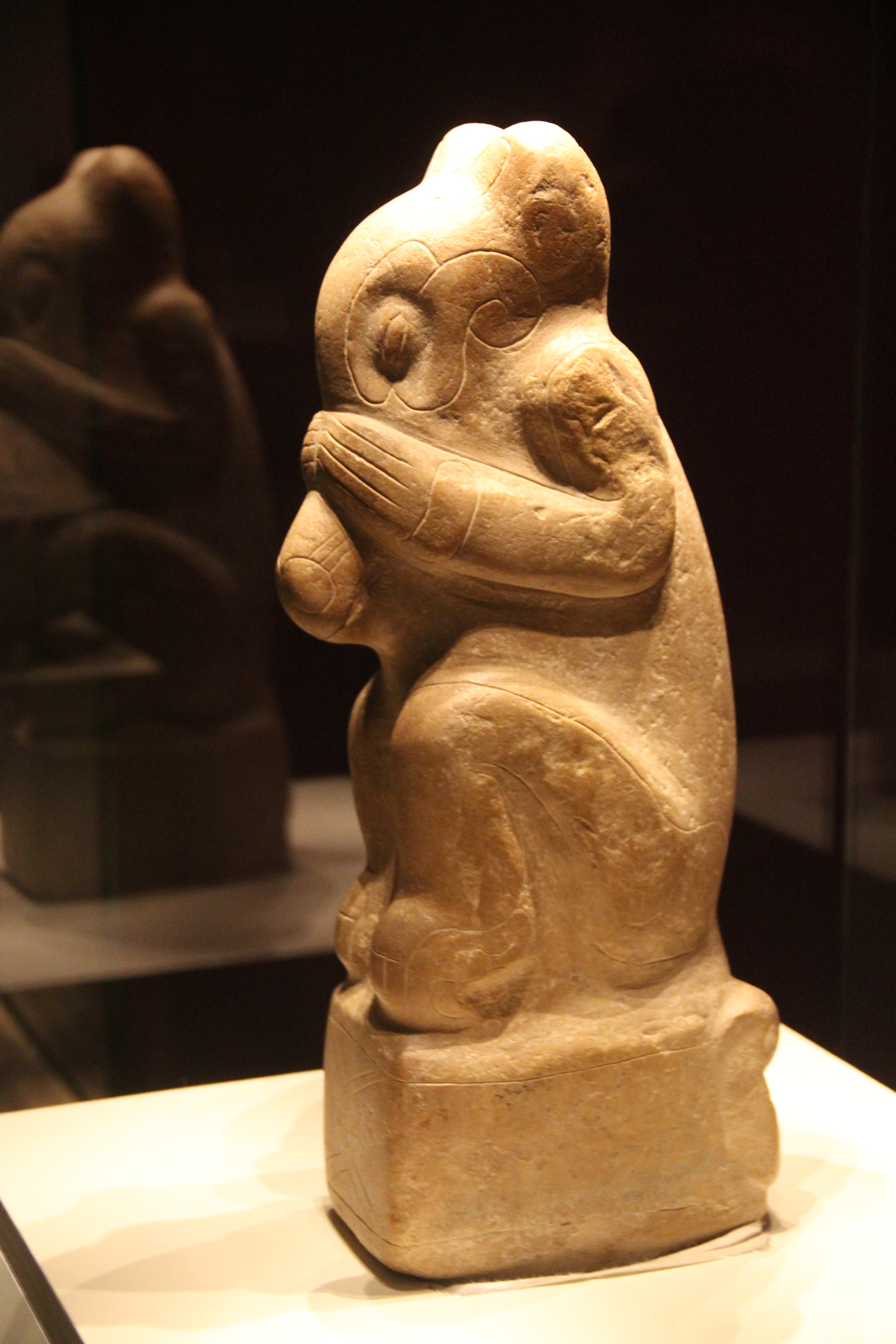
Coati sculpture from Tenam Rosario.

== Toponym ==
The original name of the site is still unknown. The name Tenam Rosario was given by archaeologists after the discovery of the site and comes from the Nahuatl word Tenamitl, which means wall or fortress, while Rosario is a reference to a nearby ejido named El Rosario. This toponymic pattern can be seen in the archaeological Maya sites of the Comitán region such as Tenam Puente and Tenam Soledad, where the word Tenam was added to the name of a local ejido or ranch to name the archaeological zone.

== History ==
According to archaeological studies, more than 250 structures and three ball courts have been identified, demonstrating that during its peak of development, the site had a very high urban and religious activity. The central core of the site is integrated by around 30 buildings and a large stone wall. The structures and buildings at the site belong to the architectural style of the Eastern Chiapas Highlands and are built using precisely cut and shaped stone slabs that fit together without mortar.
