= El Lagartero =

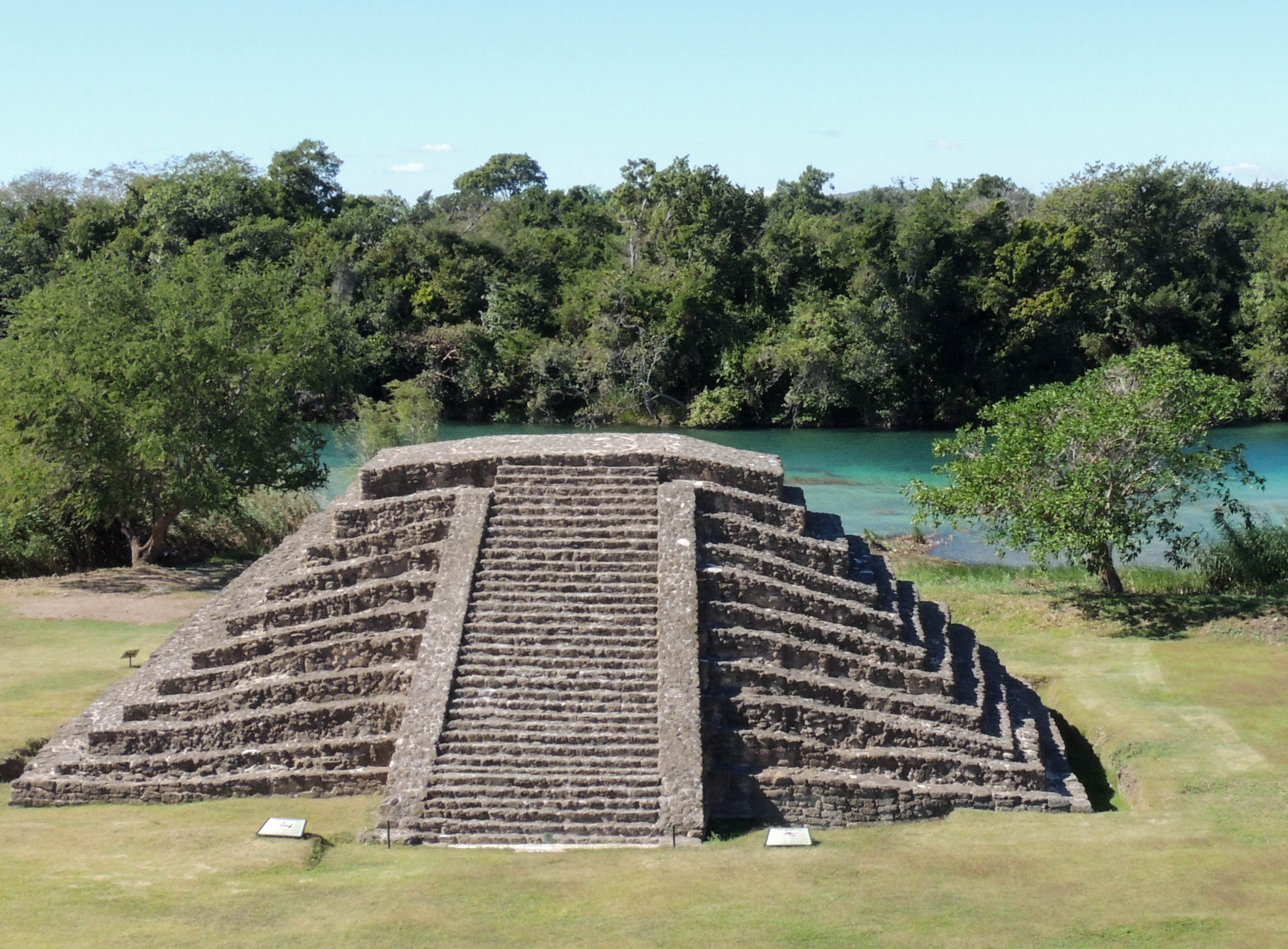
- Interactive map of El Lagartero
- Type: Mayan Archeological Site
- Cultures: Maya
- Associated with: Jakaltek

Site notes
- Management: Instituto Nacional de Antropología e Historia
- Public access: Open

El Lagartero is a Mayan prehispanic archeological zone located in a group of jungle islands in the Lakes of Colón in Chiapas, Mexico. According to archeological investigations, the site developed between 300-1400 AD in the Mesoamerican Classic period and Postclassic period. It was an important ceremonial and religious center. The people who lived there were speakers of the Jakaltek language.

The site stands out for its landscapes and vegetation along the lakes and archeological site. The main group is located on El Limonal island and contains a ceremonial center made up of four stepped pyramids. The rest of the sites, including altars, causeways, patios, stone structures and a ball court, are scattered throughout the islands that make up the area.

== Findings ==
Numerous burials, ceramics, figures with female representations showing the embroidery of huipiles and headdresses used by women of the time, jadeite objects, and representations of sea animals have been found at the site.
