= Candzibaantun =

- Location within Mexico Location within Campeche
- Type: Ancient Maya site
- Periods: Preclassic - Classic
- Cultures: Maya civilization
- Location: Mexico
- Region: Campeche

Site notes
- Discovered: 2005

Candzibaantun is an archaeological Maya site located inside the Calakmul Biosphere Reserve of the state of Campeche in Mexico. It was a Maya city of southern Campeche established since the late Preclassic period integrated by various architectural groups built on a natural elevation, the site includes large buildings, stepped pyramids, artificial platforms, patios, shrines and carved monuments. The name of Candzibaantun comes from the Maya language and means “four written stones” referencing several strone stelae carved with ancient inscriptions found on the site.

The main architectural group of Candzibaantun includes a triadic style complex integrated by a plaza with three stelae carved on its surface and a pyramid known as the Structure 1 of approximately 12 meters high.

== History ==
The occupation of Candzibaantún began in the late Preclassic period of the Maya civilization, as evidenced by several ceramics found at the site, and its development extended until the end of the Classic period. Stelae 2, 3 and 4 from Candzibaantun date from the early Classic period and contain a remote long count inscription that records the end of k’atun 8.18.0.0.0 12 Ajaw 8 Sots', which corresponds to July 7, 396 AD, making it one of the oldest Mesoamerican long count dates found in the state of Campeche and the Maya Lowlands. Candzibaantun was discovered by archaeologist Ivan Šprajc in 2005 using aerial photographs of the main architectural complex as part of an extense archaeological expedition in the southern Campeche.
