= Casa Blanca, El Salvador =

Archeological site in El Salvador

Coordinates: 13°59′21.84″N 89°40′21.16″W

Casa Blanca
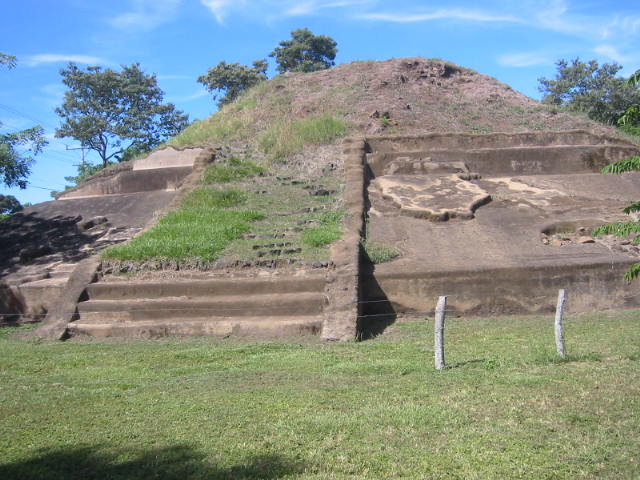
- Type: Archeological site
- Cultures: Mayan
- Location: Santa Ana, El Salvador

History
- Built: 200 BC to 600 AD
- Abandoned: 200 BC (temporarily) and 600 AD (second occupation)

Casa Blanca is a pre-Columbian Maya archeological site within the Chalchuapa archaeological zone in the department of Santa Ana, El Salvador. The site takes its name from the coffee plantation that formerly occupied the area now designated as the archeological park.

Archeological investigations show that the area was first occupied during the Late Preclassic period (500 BC – AD 250). Throughout the 1st century AD, a large platform and additional structures were constructed, expanding the original ceremonial center at the nearby archeological site of El Trapiche (es). The site was subsequently abandoned and reoccupied toward the end of the Early Classic period (AD 250 – 900) following the eruption of the Ilopango caldera, dated to between the 4th and 6th centuries AD. Occupation continued into the Late Classic period (AD 600 – 900), after which the site remain in use intermittently for burials and pilgrimages into the Postclassic period (AD 900 – 1520).

== Structures ==
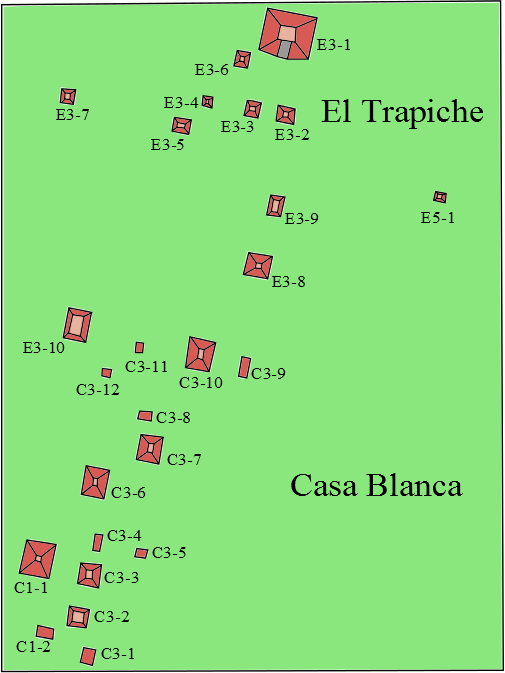
Structures of Casa Blanca y El Trapiche

Casa Blanca comprises 15 structures, each identified by an archeological designation generally beginning with C1 or C3. Of these, only six are located within the archeological park. The most prominent are Structures 1 (C1-1) and 5 (C3-6).

The structures within the park, together with Structures C3-1, C3-2, and C102 to the south, are situated on a large platform constructed during the Late Preclassic period. The platform measures 2 meters (6.6 feet) in height, 240 meters (790 feet) from north to south, and 220 meters (720 feet) from east to west. It is constructed of roughly split stones laid separately rather than bonded or closely fitted together. An access ramp on the eastern side has an inclination of approximately 6 to 8 degrees, and consists of compacted earthen surface reinforced with large stones.

=== Structures and findings of the archeological park ===
The site forms part of the Chalchuapa archaeological zone and exhibits influences associated with the Olmec andTeotihuacan civilizations. It is closely linked within the archeological sites of Tazumal and San Andrés. The Salvadoran government acquired the site in 1977, and the archeological park was named after the coffee plantation that previously occupied the area. Casa Blanca contains numerous pyramidal structures, of which two have been partially restored. The site also includes a museum exhibiting Maya ceramics and other archeological artifacts.

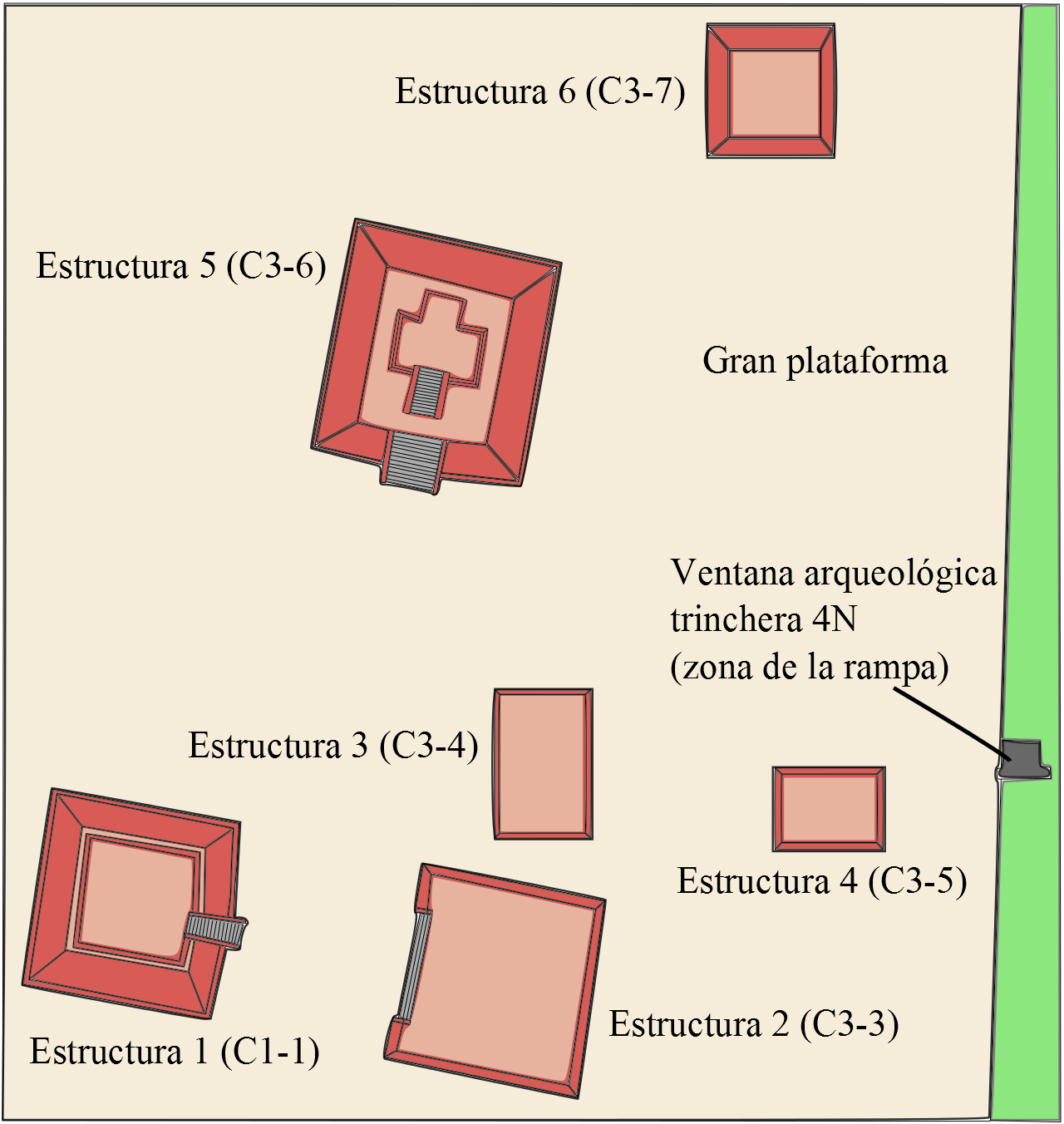
Structures of the archaeological park Casa Blanca
