= Xkipche =

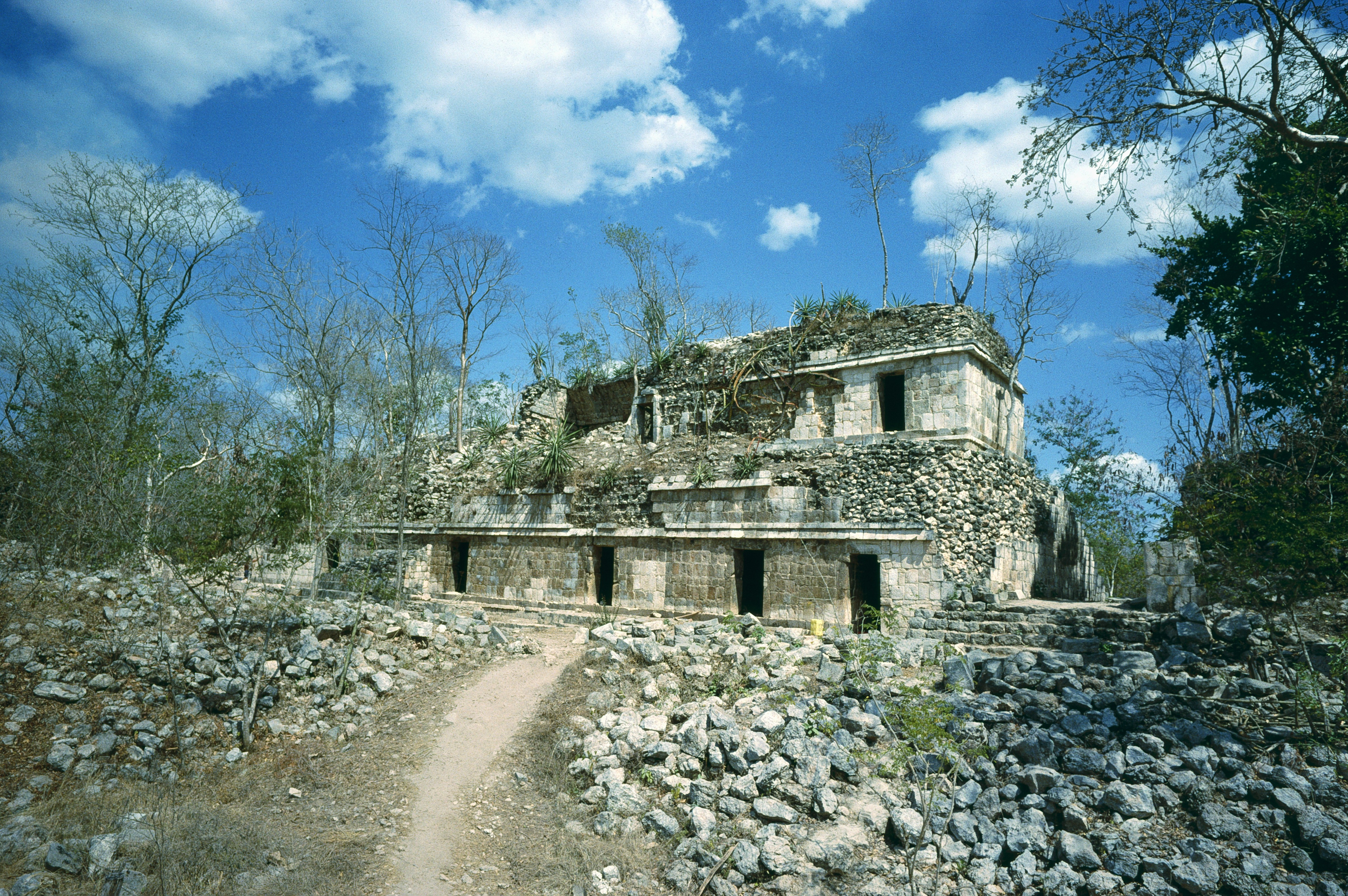
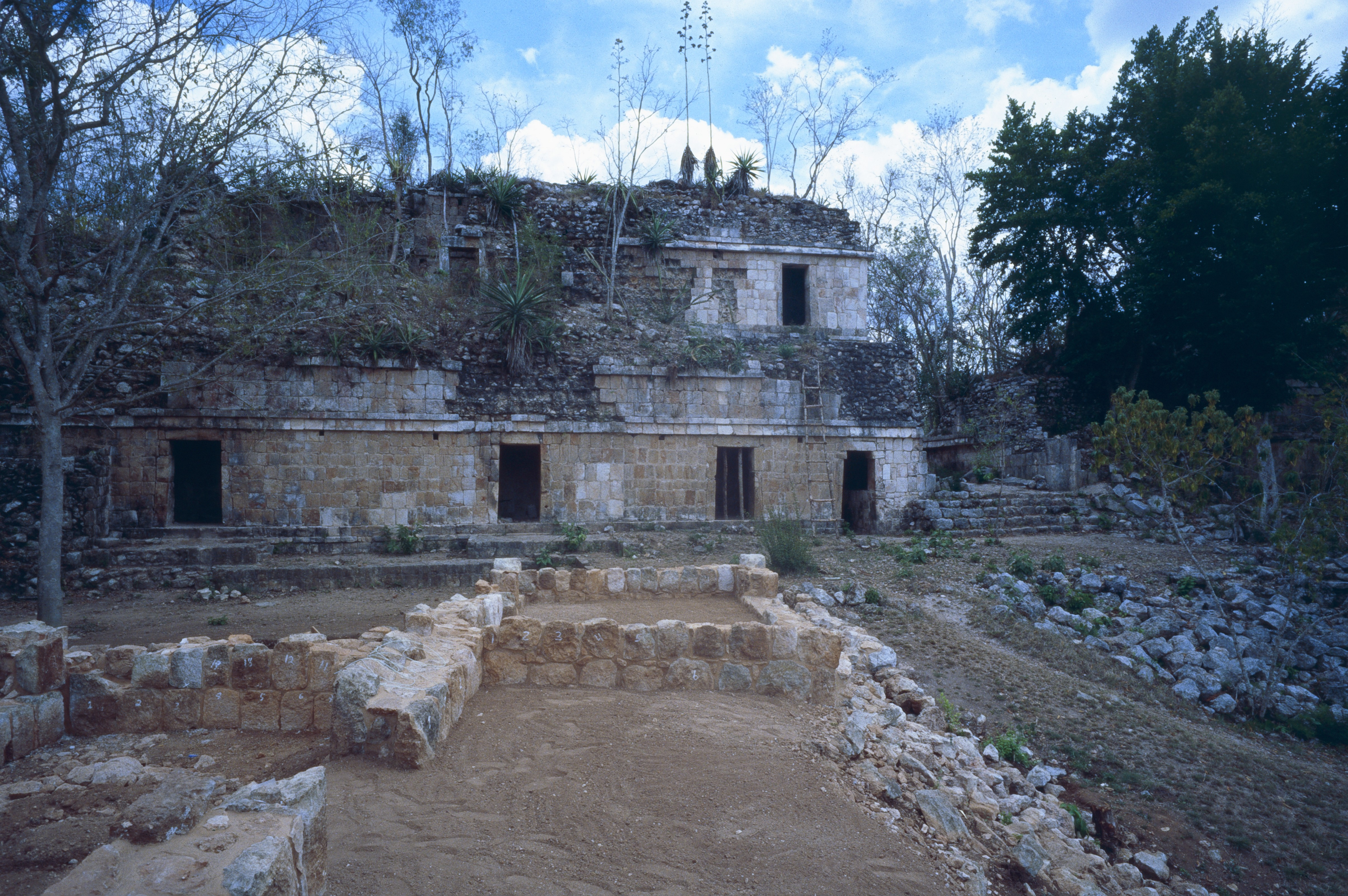
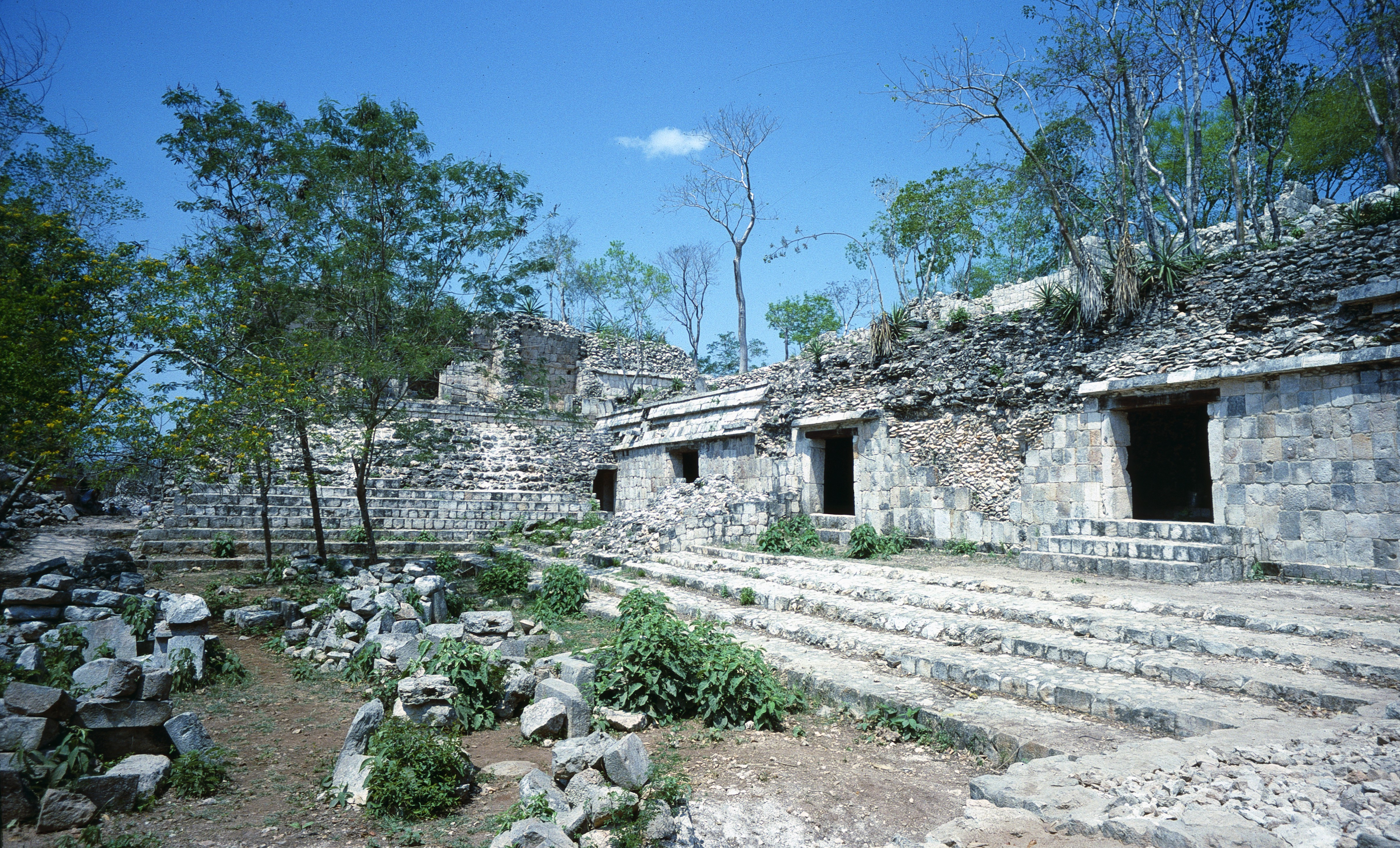
- Palace of Xkipche
- Interactive map of Xkipche
- Type: Ancient Maya site
- Periods: Late Preclassic - Late Classic
- Cultures: Maya civilization
- Location: Mexico
- Region: Puuc

History
- Built: 200 - 950 AD
- Abandoned: c. 1000 AD

Site notes
- Discovered: 1893

Xkipche is an archaeological Maya site located in the Puuc region of Yucatán in Mexico. It developed during the early and late classic period of the Mayan civilization, the site includes a large number of Puuc architectural style buildings and its main structure is a large two-story palace with several rooms. It is located approximately 9 km south of the ancient Maya city of Uxmal.

== History ==
Xkipche was an ancient Maya city in the Puuc region whose initial settlement has been dated to the late Preclassic period, although it reached its greatest development during the Early Classic and Late Classic periods, during which its main buildings were built. Numerous burials and bone remains have been found on the site, which, according to anthropological research, have identified sociocultural differences present in the pre-Columbian inhabitants and society of Xkipche.

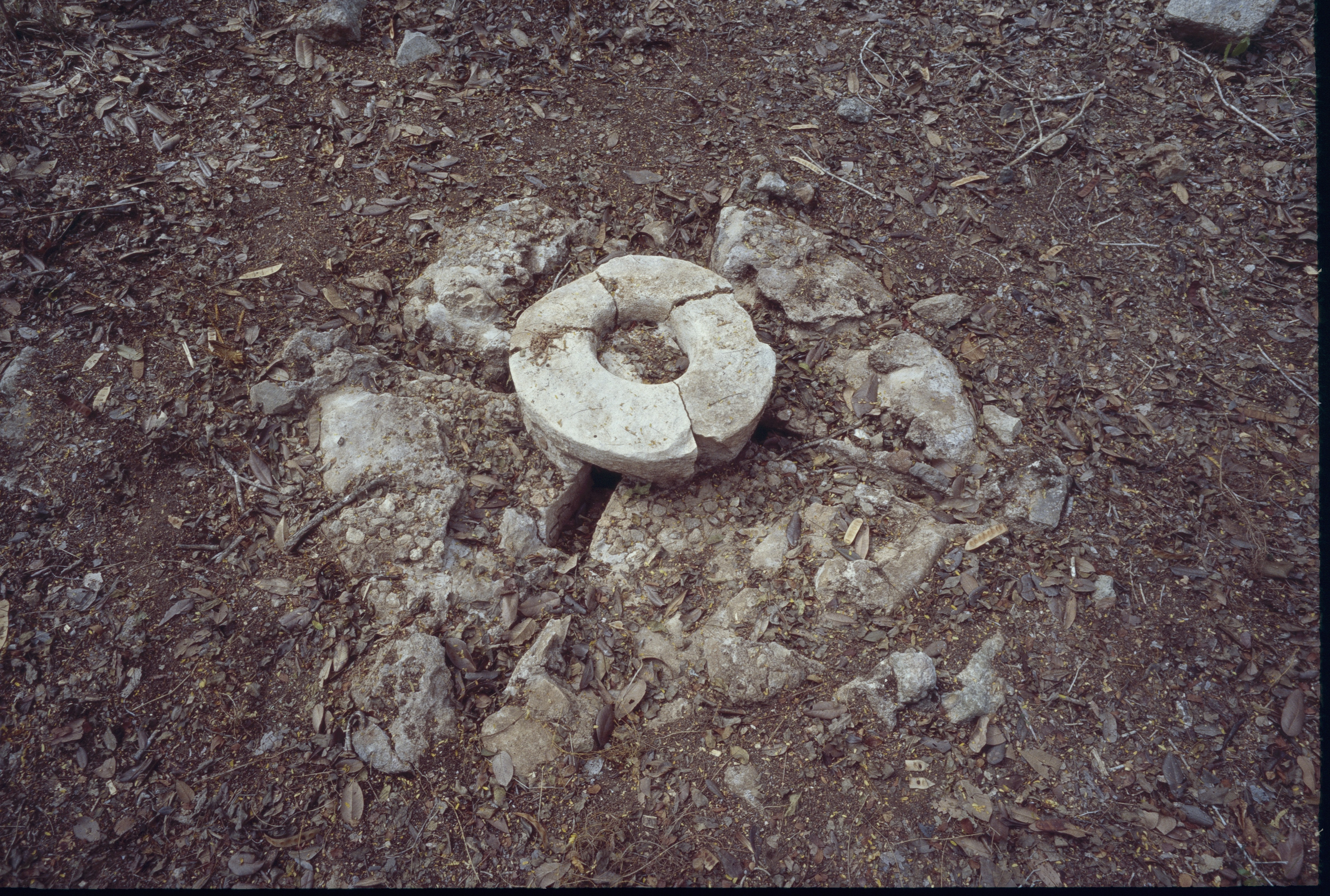
Chultun at Xkipche

The archaeological site of Xkipche was discovered in 1893 by archaeologist Teoberto Maler during his exploration in the Puuc region of Yucatán, where he took photographs and made descriptions of the main palace. After Maler's exploration, Xkipche did not receive further attention and its location was lost in the jungle until it was rediscovered by archaeologists in 1986 when they flew over the area. Since then, the site has been excavated by several archaeological investigations.

In 2023, Xkipche garnered media attention after a real estate offer for the sale of the land where the archaeological site is located appeared on social media, promoting and listing the presence of ancient Maya ruins and structures as an attraction and selling point. A few days later, the site was protected by the National Guard of Mexico and Mexican archaeological authorities and institutions after considering it an attack on the country's cultural heritage.
