= Lagunita =

Lagunita is an ancient Maya city, located in the Yucatán Peninsula, Mexico. It was identified in August 2014, along with Tamchen, by Ivan Sprajc, associate professor at the Research Center of the Slovenian Academy of Sciences and Arts, and his team, after they reviewed aerial photographs of the area. The identification was made with the use of aerial photographs.

The site was visited in the 1970s by the Swiss archaeologist Eric Von Euw, who documented the facade and other monuments with drawings. However, the exact location of the city, which Von Euw referred to as Lagunita, had been unclear until 2013. All other attempts at locating it had failed.
