= Chacmultun =

Ancient Maya site in Mexico

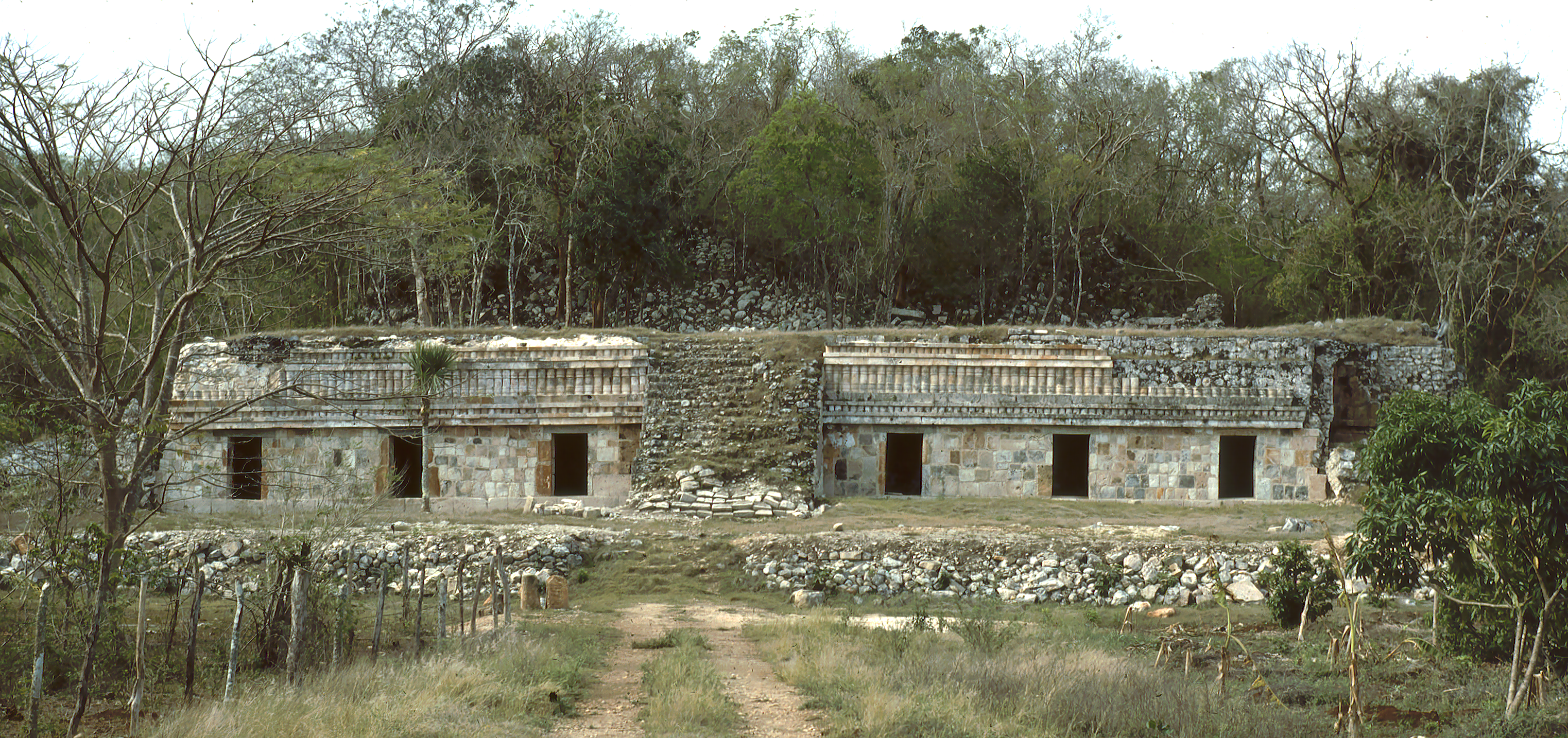
- First storey of the Cabalpak building

- Location within Yucatán
- 20°10′17″N 89°20′41″W
- Location: Yucatán, Mexico

Chacmultun is an ancient Maya site in Mexico's Yucatan Province that dates to the late Preclassic period. "Chacmultun" means "mounds of red stone" in the Maya language, the site got this name from the distinct red color of the buildings there. It is located 126 km from Mérida.

== Ancient Chacmultun ==
Chacmultun's most distinguishing feature is the red stone from which its buildings are made. This color was the result of microorganisms living in the stone which turned red when they came into contact with air and water. The site was discovered in the 19th century by the Austrian explorer Teobert Maler, and was excavated in detail during the 1970s. The city center covers one square kilometer. There are four main districts of the city: Chacmultun, Cabalpak, Xetpol and the Central district. These groups of buildings were built on hills or artificial terraces to make them seem more imposing. It is thought that the city had trade links with many other contemporary Maya sites in the area, like Edzna, Oxkintok, Uxmal and Kabah. Some buildings contain preserved Maya murals, which are quite rare. The city reached its peak during the Late Classic period, during the 10th century. The buildings at Chacmultun are designed in the Puuc architectural style, with elaborate friezes decorating the buildings. The site was continuously occupied until the 15th century.
