= Dzehkabtún =

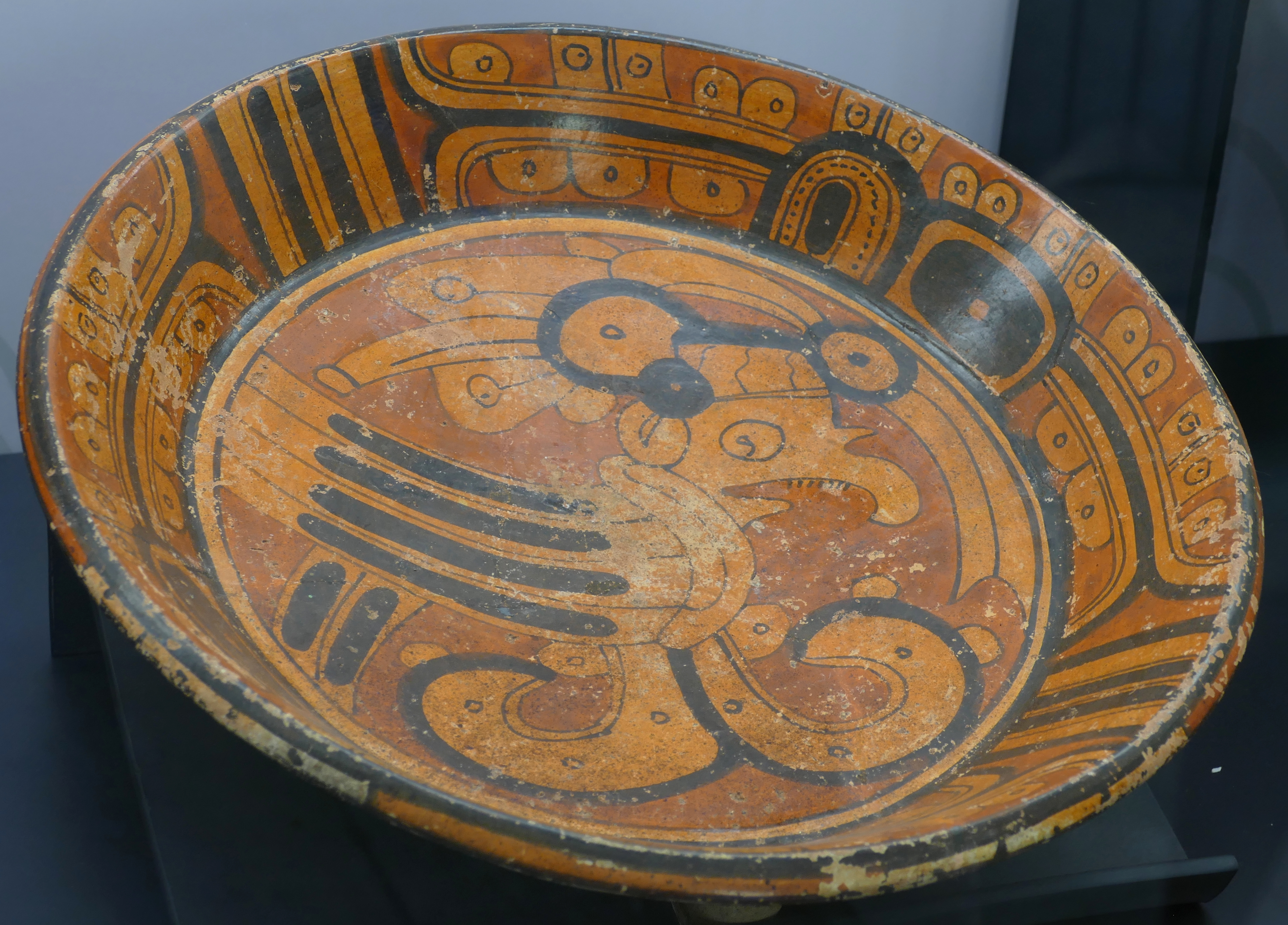
- Muwan bird from the Haab' Maya calendar in a ceramic from Dzehkabtun
- Type: Ancient Maya city
- Periods: Preclassic - Classic
- Cultures: Maya civilization
- Location: Mexico
- Region: Chenes - Puuc

Site notes
- Architectural style: Chenes - Puuc

Dzehkabtún is an archaeological Maya site located in the state of Campeche, Mexico over the transition zone between the Puuc and Chenes region that comprises a group of ceremonial and residential architectural complexes that formed a large pre-hispanic Maya city. The construction of the site started since the Preclassic period and it reached a significant development between 300 and 1000 AD during the Classic period of Mesoamerica.

== Location ==
Dzehkabtún is located in northern Campeche, approximately 8 kilometers south of the city of Hopelchén in the municipality of Hopelchén, between the sites of Edzná and Xtampak, over the territory of a former Hacienda called Holcatzin.

== Architecture ==
The archaeological site of Dzehkabtún integrates several architectural complexes with buildings and structures for ceremonial and residential use, including a monumental palace type building with roof comb, pyramids, patios and plazas. Within the residential complexes, numerous burials with ceramics and ritual offerings have been found. Lintels and stelae have also been found in Dzehkabtún, mainly showing representations and figures of Maya deities such as Chak Chel, god L and Chaak.

In Dzehkabtún, around 146 pre-Hispanic water storages known as chultun have been registered, some of which have collapsed or were covered by the ancient Maya, only 32 remain open and intact. Inside a chultun from Dzehkabtún known as chultun 36 and sealed under the structure of a building built in the classical period, a large burial was found with the skeletal remains of two individuals, one of whom preserved an almost complete skeleton, as well as several ceramic offerings dating between the Classic and late Classic periods.

== History ==
Archaeological discoveries indicate that the beginning of the long history of Dzehkabtún dates back to approximately the middle Preclassic period and had its peak and greatest development in the Classic period between 300 and 1000 AD, which culminated in its subsequent collapse and abandonment.

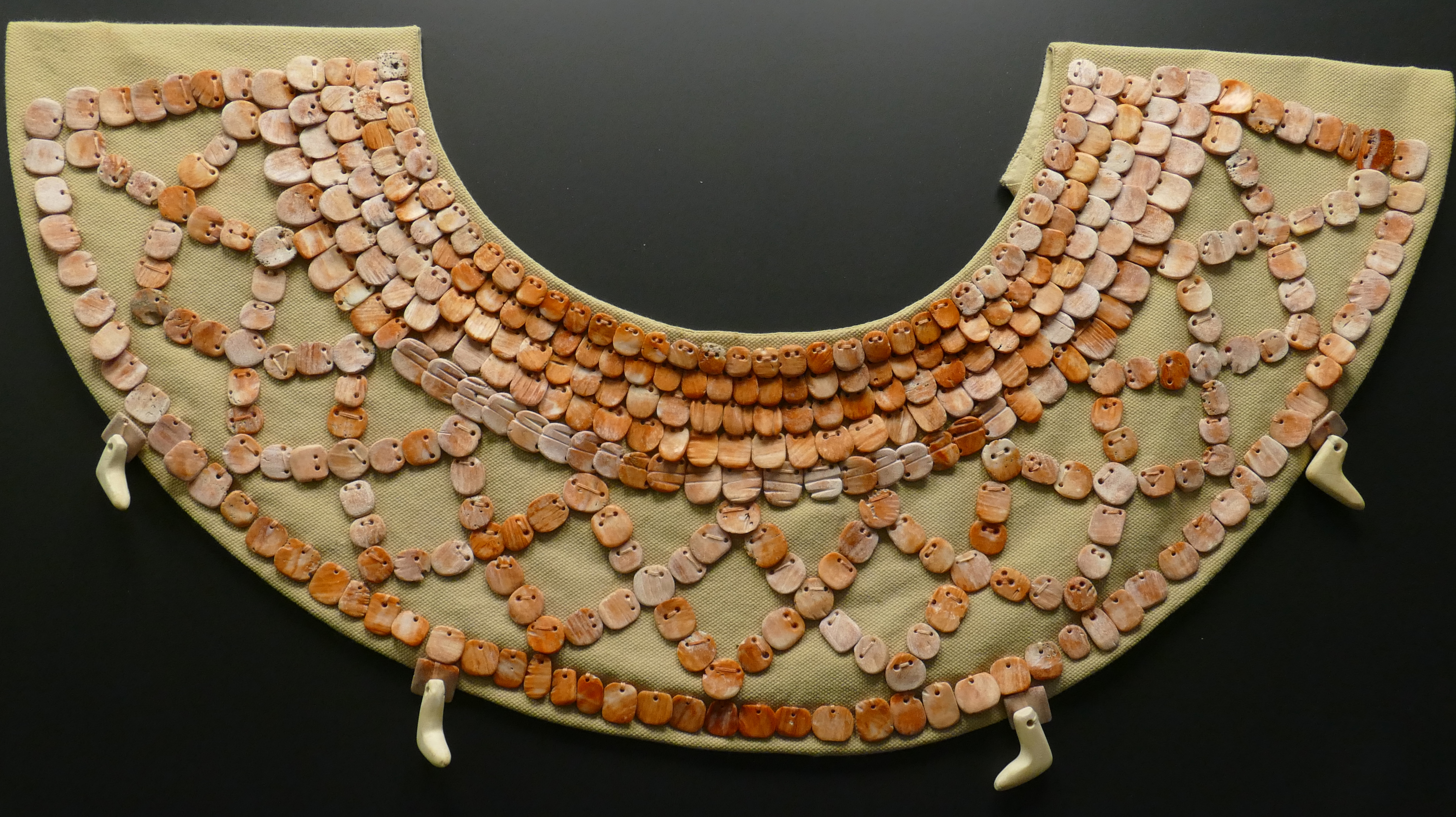
Shell Necklace from the Late Classic, Dzehkabtun

The site was first documented by Teoberto Maler in 1887 during his first expedition to the Yucatán Peninsula in Mexico as part of an archaeological exploration where he made photographs, illustrations and several academic reports on the conditions of the site and its most notable constructions, highlighting the existence of a large main palace and a decorated building with a roof comb.
