= Salinas de los Nueve Cerros =

Archaeological site

Salinas de los Nueve Cerros is an archaeological site located in west-central Guatemala. It is the only Precolumbian salt works in the Maya lowlands and one of the longest-occupied sites in Guatemala (c. 1000 BC - AD 1100).

== Etymology ==
At the time of the Spanish conquest, the region was under the control of the Akalaha Maya who were engaged in salt production at the site and referred to the nearby sierra as Bolontewitz ("Nine Hills"). The Spaniards began to refer to the salt works as las salinas de los Nueve Cerros ("the salt source of the Nine Hills").

== Site description ==
Nueve Cerros is located in the southern Maya lowlands along the Chixoy River in the present-day municipalities of Cobán, Alta Verapaz and Ixcan, El Quiche. The site is defined by several geographic features—the Nueve Cerros ridge forms its western border and the Tortugas salt dome is located in its center. A brine stream flows out of the dome forming several salt flats before becoming diluted and flowing into the Chixoy. The site includes several zones with monumental architecture—the salt works atop an 11-meter artificial platform at the base of the dome and epicenter between the dome and the ridge, the Tierra Blanca group along the Chixoy, and a series of large plaza groups to the north of the dome.

== History ==
A permanent population existed at the site by the Early Middle Preclassic period (1000-800 BC) and the site continued to grow and expand through the Late Classic (AD 600–850). Instead of being abandoned like most of its peers during the Terminal Classic (AD 780–1000), the site continued to be occupied until well into the Early Postclassic (AD 900–1200). The salt works continued to be exploited well into the 20th century.

=== Preclassic ===
Salinas de los Nueve Cerros has some of the oldest ceramics in the Maya world dating to the Early Middle Preclassic (1000-800 BC). Multiple parts of the site were occupied, although during this time period the population most likely belonged to several distinct villages or towns. Excavations in the salt works have uncovered evidence of large-scale production in the Late Preclassic (250 BC - AD 250); since none of the pits reached sterile, it is impossible to say at present what the scale of production was in earlier time periods.

=== Classic ===
By the Classic period, however, the towns had grown together to form one single area of contiguous occupation. Salt production reached its peak by the Late Classic—based on experimentation done by Berkeley archaeologist Brian Dillon and his team in the 1970s, residents of the site could have produced up to 24,000 tons per year through boiling and solar evaporation. Once it had dried, the salt was stored in giant vasijonas, bowls with diameters approaching 2 meters that were located throughout the salt works. In addition, there is evidence of production of other products for exportation, including obsidian, jade, and agricultural goods.

=== Postclassic ===
While the site was not abandoned at the end of the Classic period (c. AD 850), only parts of the site have evidence of occupation during the Postclassic. Since the southern lowland market for salt and other goods was effectively wiped out due to the abandonment of all of the major cities, residents of Nueve Cerros appear to have strengthened economic and cultural ties to the northern highlands, which experienced a florescence at this time.

None of the recovered materials date to the last few centuries before the Spanish conquest, although according to ethnohistorical sources, the Akalaha Maya from the Gulf coast of modern-day Tabasco, Mexico had taken over the region and were producing salt for export.

=== Modern History ===
Nueve Cerros and other sites in the southern lowlands were among the last to be conquered by the Spaniards. The region continued to be independent until the 1690s, although the Spaniards were interested in the salt source as early as 1620. After the region was conquered, the salt source was converted into a finca that fell under the hands of the municipality of Cobán, Alta Verapaz in the 19th century. The municipality sold rights to salt production well into the 20th century, although once it was connected to the Caribbean and Pacific coasts through a road and railway, sea salt became cheaper and more popular. Since the 1950s, the municipality has looked for new ways to make money from the finca, including sulfur production and petroleum.

Beginning in the 1980s, Q'eqchi' Maya from highland Alta Verapaz have moved into the region, using much of the local land for milpa. Over the past 5 years, local leaders have been pushing for the creation of locally managed ecotourism at the site, although the mayor of Coban has opposed all efforts to develop the industry.

== Investigations ==
The site was first registered by Austrian explorer Simeon Habel, and visited soon after by Karl Sapper, who took a monument from the site back to Berlin. Berkeley graduate student Brian Dillon conducted research at the site in the late 1970s, where he studied the history of salt production there. Several small-scale projects returned to the site in the 1990s and 2000s, including one directed by Dillon to study the giant salt storage vessels.

In 2009, a team of Guatemalan and American archaeologists were invited into the site to found a new project in collaboration with local leaders. Proyecto Salinas de los Nueve Cerros began in 2010 with the goal of combining archaeological, geological, historical, and ethnographic research with community development.
