= Altar de los Reyes =

Maya site in Campeche, Mexico

- Altar de los Reyes Altar 3
- Interactive map of Altar de los Reyes
- Type: Ancient Maya site
- Periods: Late Preclassic - Classic
- Cultures: Maya civilization
- Location: Mexico
- Region: Calakmul Biosphere Reserve

History
- Built: c. 200 BC - 850 AD
- Abandoned: c. 900 AD

Site notes
- Governing body: Instituto Nacional de Antropología e Historia

Altar de los Reyes is a Maya archaeological site located in southern Campeche, Mexico, within the Calakmul Biosphere Reserve. It was a large ancient pre-Columbian Maya city that developed from around the Late Preclassic period through the Terminal Classic period. The site's modern name (Altar of the Kings in Spanish) derives from the discovery of a unique stone monument from the Late Classic period known as Altar 3, which stands out for being carved with a series of emblem glyphs representing some of the greatest political entities of that late period, including Calakmul (Kaanu’l dynasty), Palenque, Tikal, Edzna, Motul de San José, among others, the largest number of emblem glyphs ever recorded on a single monument.

The site includes a monumental architectural complex known as the Main Group, which comprises a large civic-ceremonial center with two large acropolises, plazas, and numerous structures. All the structures at the site are buried and covered by the region's dense jungle vegetation. The main group is located approximately 8 kilometers (5.0 mi) south of the modern town of Ley de Fomento Agropecuario in the municipality of Calakmul, Campeche, other smaller groups are located around the surrounding area.

== Archaeology ==
Altar de los Reyes Stela 2

According to archaeological studies, the site had an occupation that dates back to at least the Late Preclassic period, the earliest discovery at the site is Stela 2, a stone fragment that shows iconography on both sides. Although incomplete and lacking information to date it precisely, its style corresponds to the Late Preclassic period, making it the oldest monument at the site and one of the earliest monuments located in southern Campeche. This indicates the beginning of ritual and ceremonial activities before the Classic period. In the Southeast Group, a large pyramidal base known as Structure 1 stands out, it features a triadic temple complex at its summit reaching a total height of 20 meters and, based on its architectural characteristics, has been dated to the Late Preclassic period. The evidence of Tzakol ceramic complex, dating to the Early Classic period suggest that this was the area from which urban expansion began. The core of the site is known as the Main Group, which contains two large monumental acropolises. In the surrounding area, there are smaller architectural groups consisting of residential structures and isolated pyramidal structures.

Altar de los Reyes Stela 1

Altar de los Reyes Stela 1 commemorates a ceremony held according to its inscription on August 15, 800 CE (or in the Long Count date 9.18.10.0.0 10 Ajaw 8 Sak) and performed by a local ruler, the remainder of the text indicates that it was a ritual involving the scattering of drops and includes an emblem glyph that might correspond to that of the city but its reading has been lost due to erosion. Its other side features a scene depicting a figure seated cross-legged atop a large mask, with another individual seated above, possibly the ruler mentioned in the inscription.

Altar de los Reyes Altar 3

One of the greatest discoveries at Altar de los Reyes is its Altar 3, which is also the one that gives the archaeological site its modern name. This monument is dated to the Late Classic period and, due to its characteristics, it is believed to be contemporary to the Stela 1. Altar de los Reyes Altar 3 is considered of great importance in the study of Maya epigraphy and archaeology because it contains an unusual hieroglyphic inscription listing 13 emblem glyphs corresponding to what were possibly, from the perspective of the rulers of Altar de los Reyes, the major political entities of their time. Among these, the emblem glyphs of the Kaanu’l dynasty (Dzibanché - Calakmul), Palenque, Edzna, Tikal, Motul de San José, Altun Ha, and the Xukalnaah glyph linked to both Bonampak and Lacanha have been identified, in addition to the title Chatahn Winik. The remaining glyphs have not been properly deciphered due to erosion. This is the largest number of emblem glyphs inscribed on a single known monument. At the top is the figure of a ruler seated on a throne, looking to one side, accompanied by an inscription that has been deciphered as “Sacred lands, thirteen lands” (Ch’olti’: k’uhul kab, uxlajuun kab) or “Sacred lands, thirteen divisions” (k’uhul kab, uxlajuun tzuk). This could indicate that the emblem glyphs mentioned on its sides formed part of a sacred territory consisting of a network of thirteen important dynasties and cities. On the side of Altar 3 are inscribed the 13 emblem glyphs, accompanied by an inscription deciphered as: “It is the seed of the thrones of Chatahn Winik” (Sak saak tz’amil Chatahn winik). The title Chatahn Winik belonged to an ancient elite group of great importance in the southern Campeche and northern Petén Basin region. At the time the altar was created, during the decline of the Maya region, the title of Chathan Winik title remained significant for the rulers of Altar de los Reyes over the large political entities that were beginning to decline. When it was discovered, Altar 3 was found broken, likely intentionally by the ancient inhabitants of the city or as part of a ritual.

The archaeological site was rediscovered in 1998, following reports from local residents regarding the existence of stone structures and monuments in an area they knew as Zapote Bobal. Later, archaeologists named the site Altar de los Reyes, in reference to the discovery of Altar 3 and to avoid confusion with another archaeological site located in Guatemala (Zapote Bobal).
