= Chac Chel =

Mayan goddess

The Dresden Codex depicts Chac Chel as a old woman pouring water

Chac Chel is a powerful and ancient Mayan goddess of creation, destruction, childbirth, water, weaving and spinning, healing, and divining. She is half of the original Creator Couple, seen most often as the wife of Chaac, who is the pre-eminent god of lightning and rain, although she is occasionally paired with the Creator God Itzamna in the Popol Vuh, a recording of the myths of the highland Maya. This highlights her importance, as dualities such as male/female and husband/wife were extremely important to the Maya, and one cannot function without the other. Chac Chel is also called Goddess O by many Mayanists and she is the aged, grandmotherly counterpart to the young goddess of childbirth and weaving, Ix Chel (also known as Goddess I and Ixik Kab). Most popular in the Late Classic and Postclassic Periods, she is most often depicted in scenes in the Dresden Codex and Madrid Codex. Depictions of her, and burial goods related to her, have also been found in Chichen Itza, the Balankanche Cave near Chichen Itza, Tulum, The Margarita Tomb in Copan, and in Yaxchilan.

== Identification ==
In the Dresden Codex, Chac Chel is frequently depicted with a red body, a color of great power to the Maya, and which corresponds to the 'Chac' part of her name. While Chac Chel is the grandmotherly aspect of Ix Chel, she is not always depicted as kindly and benevolent. She is frequently shown as clawed and fanged, and she wears a diamond-patterned skirt decorated with crossed bones and other death symbols. Jaina figurines depicting Chac Chel also show her wearing white skirts with red spots and darker spotted skirts bearing the skull and crossbones motif. She also wears a twisted serpent headdress, linking her to the Divine Serpent, storms, and floods. She is also frequently depicted holding an upended water vessel, further tying her to the element of water. Images associating her with jaguars appear most often in the Postclassic, but in one Late Classic vessel, she is shown to have association with jaguars, as she bears a jaguar ear and a spotted "Ix" eye. She is also identified as a goddess of weaving by her occasional association with spiders and depictions of her with spindle whorls of cotton in her hair.

== Meaning of the name ==
Schellhas first identified this goddess as Goddess O, and phonetic readings of the Goddess O name glyph identify her as the aged Ix Chel. However, further examination by Knorosov of the hieroglyphs that accompany her, especially the T109 'chac' prefix, concluded that her name actually reads "chac ch'el(e)." In Yucatac, "chac" means 'red' or 'great' and "chel" is the word for rainbow. Unlike Western traditions, the Maya view rainbows as harbingers of destruction, termination, and disease. Therefore, Chac Chel could mean "Great End", or "Red Rainbow" signifying that she is a goddess of floods and world destruction.

== As a goddess of creation, fertility and life ==
In Maya mythology, the world emerged from a primordial cave of creation, from which rain, maize, and cacao (the necessities for human life) derived. In many scenes, Chac and Chac Chel are depicted with the hieroglyph representing this cave, "kab'ch'e'en", which shows that they are sometimes considered to be the couple of all creation. Rain and water were the most important of the 4 main elements to the Maya, as rain ensures successful crops. In many scenes, Chac Chel is seen holding an upended water jar, also seen to be used by Chacs, to dispense the rain that was invaluable to the agricultural fertility the Maya depended on. She is also seen holding Chac's serpent scepter of lightning, which causes the rains to fall and seeds to grow.

Maize, or corn, was the most important Maya crop and they believed that humans were made from ground maize. In Tulum Mural 2, Chac Chel is depicted grinding the maize kernels that were used to form humans; in Tulum Structure 16 she is depicted nursing a young Maize God. In some iconography we see that Corn God E sometimes wears Chac Chel's skirt, and it is known that elite male and female humans are shown performing a variety of rituals while wearing the skirt of Chac Chel. This donning of a deity's costume in order to be temporarily transformed into that deity and acquire the traits and powers of that god was common to the ancient Maya.

The artifact assembly found in the Balankanche Cave links her further to life and creation as caves were commonly used for fertility rituals and rain ceremonies, and spindle whorls, manos, metates, and incense censors used to call forth rain clouds were found, as well as many artifacts relating to Tlaloc, the Aztec god of rain. There was also evidence of ritual activities that mimicked Chac Chel, including the pouring of water from jars and the symbolic grinding of maize to form humans.

On the Birth Vase, Chac Chel is depicted at least 7 times in both her young Ix Chel and aged Chac Chel forms. On this vase, the aged Chac Chel is shown giving birth on a mountain, attended by midwives dressed like her, even though she would be too old to give birth at that age, strengthening her role as goddess of childbirth.

== As a goddess of destruction ==
In many instances, Chac Chel is depicted as a goddess of destruction as well as creation, which fits with the ancient Maya emphasis on duality. In the Tulum Structure 16 murals, she wears a serpent headdress and holds another serpent in her hands, which could symbolize her role as the bringer of world-ending deluges. On page 30b of the Madrid Codex, she is seen standing with streams of blue water pouring from her loins and breasts while God B sits at her feet, indicating that she not only brings devastating floods, but also is of extreme importance, as males are rarely situated lower than females in Maya iconography. In other scenes, she is shown having an amorous affair with God B and in another, both deities are depicted among a flood that has destroyed the world. In bas-relief iconography from a column in the Lower Temple of the Jaguars in Chichen Itza, a skeletalized Chac Chel is shown with God N supporting an Atlantean figure wearing a cross-bone skirt.

== As a goddess of weaving ==
Chac Chel is associated frequently with spiders, as well as cotton spindle whorls, which identify her with spinning, weaving, and cloth production in Postclassic Maya society. The fact that Chac Chel is a goddess of weaving made her extremely important, as cloth production was crucial to trade and religious rituals. On page 42b of the Dresden Codex, she appears standing on a serpent with a serpent headdress and 3 spindles wound with cotton thread in her hair.

In the Margarita Tomb in Copan, Honduras the burial of an elite female contained dozens of items linking her to Chac Chel, including an Oliva shell inside a spondylus shell located on top of her pelvis (the child birthing aspect of Chac Chel), concentrations of jade beads along both sides of her lower body that may have been the remains of a jade skirt that showed her weaving prowess and emulation of Chac Chel, pyrite mirrors used in divination, and weaving tools such as spindle whorls and bone needles. This burial may indicate that Maya elites partially legitimized their power and high status by associating with Chac Chel. There was also evidence that rituals venerating women were performed there for many years after the elite woman's burial, as weaving tool kits were carefully placed in the chamber.

== As a diviner ==
Divination was extremely important to the Postclassic Maya. Virtually all events required a divination forecast, which greatly influenced the course of action taken by the participants and its outcome. The Maya generally used pyrite mirror, mirror bowls, and special stones to divine the future and the spirit world. On page 42a of the Dresden Codex, Chac Chel is depicted as sitting on a pyramid and holding a mirror bowl, containing the face of God C; and there were also pyrite mirrors found in the Margarita Tomb in Copan. Her serpent headdress may also indicate her role as a diviner, as the ancient Maya are commonly shown communing with deities and the divine forces via a Vision Serpent.

== Central Mexican counterparts ==
Chac Chel seems to be closely related to several goddesses of Central Mexico. Aged goddesses wearing twisted serpent headdresses and with similar associations as Chac Chel are commonly found all over the Yucatec Maya region as well as the Valley of Mexico. She seems to be most similar to Cihuacoatl, the Aztec goddess of childbirth, the aged Aztec goddess of weaving Tlazolteotl, and the Tzitzimime, a set of celestial women that follow the same young/old aspects of Ix Chel/Chac Chel. She may also be related to Xochiquetzal, the wife of Chaac's Aztec counterpart Tlaloc, although Xochiquetzal may relate more with her Ix Chel aspect. She is also occasionally depicted wearing dress and hairstyles that closely resemble central Mexican styles during the Postclassic Period.

== Bibliography ==
- Ardren, T. (2006) Mending the past: Ix Chel and the invention of a modern pop goddess. Antiquity 80 (307):25-37.
- Bassie-Sweet, K. (1999) Corn deities and the complementary male/female principle. La Tercera Mesa Redonda de Palenque.
- Bell, E. E. (2002). Engendering a dynasty: A royal woman in the Margarita tomb, Copan. Ancient Maya Women, AltaMira Press, Walnut Creek, CA, 89-104.
- Evans, S. T. (2008). Ancient Mexico & Central America: archaeology and culture history. Thames & Hudson.
- Miller, M. E. (2005) Rethinking Jaina: Goddesses, Skirts, and the Jolly Roger. Record of the Princeton University Art Museum 64:63-70.
- Schellhas, P. (1910) Representation of deities of the Maya manuscripts. (Vol. 4, No. 1): The Museum.
- Sharer, R. J., & Traxler, L. P. (2006). The Ancient Maya. Stanford University Press.
- Taube, K. A. (1992). The major gods of ancient Yucatán. Studies in Pre-Columbian Art and Archaeology, i-160.
- Taube, K. A. (1994). The Birth Vase: Natal Imagery in Ancient Maya Myth and Ritual. In: The Maya Vase Book, Volume 4. edited by Barbara and Justin Kerr, 650-685. New York: Kerr Associates
- Vail, G., & Hernández, C. (2014). 11 Rain and Fertility Rituals in Postclassic Yucatán Featuring Chaakand Chak Chel. The Ancient Maya of Mexico: Reinterpreting the Past of the Northern Maya Lowlands.
- Vail, G., & Stone, A. (2002). Representations of women in Postclassic and Colonial Maya literature and art (pp. 203–228). In Ancient Maya Women. edited by Ardren, T. (2001). Rowman Altamira.
