= Tzendales =

Lost Maya city in Chiapas, Mexico

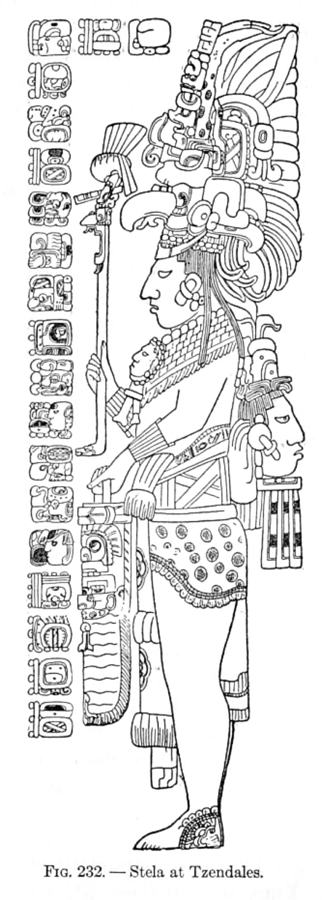
- Stela of Tzendales
- Type: Lost Maya city
- Periods: Classic
- Cultures: Maya civilization
- Location: Mexico
- Region: Lacandon Jungle, Chiapas

Site notes
- Discovered: 1905

Tzendales is an ancient city of the Maya civilization in ruins located in the tropical depths of the Lacandon Jungle of Chiapas in Mexico near the Tzendales River, which after being rediscovered in the early 20th century its exact location was lost and is now considered to be a lost city. From the archaeological site of Tzendales is known the description and existence of large structures and buildings, monuments and a large stone stela called the “stela of Tzendales”.

The Maya city of Tzendales was first documented in 1905 by American archaeologist Alfred Tozzer during an expedition to study the Lacandon people of Chiapas in the depths of the Lacandon Jungle of Mexico, describing it as a large city with large structures and buildings with roof combs. According to his own map made in a travel report, the site is located somewhere near the Tzendales River in a very remote location of difficult access due to the high density of the jungle and the thick vegetation that has impeded its exploration. Currently, its exact location and the condition of its structures and monuments are unknown, although, according to Alfred Tozzer, during his visit he found ceremonial Lacandon incense burners on the structures, which shows that the site was already visited by the Lacandon before his arrival.

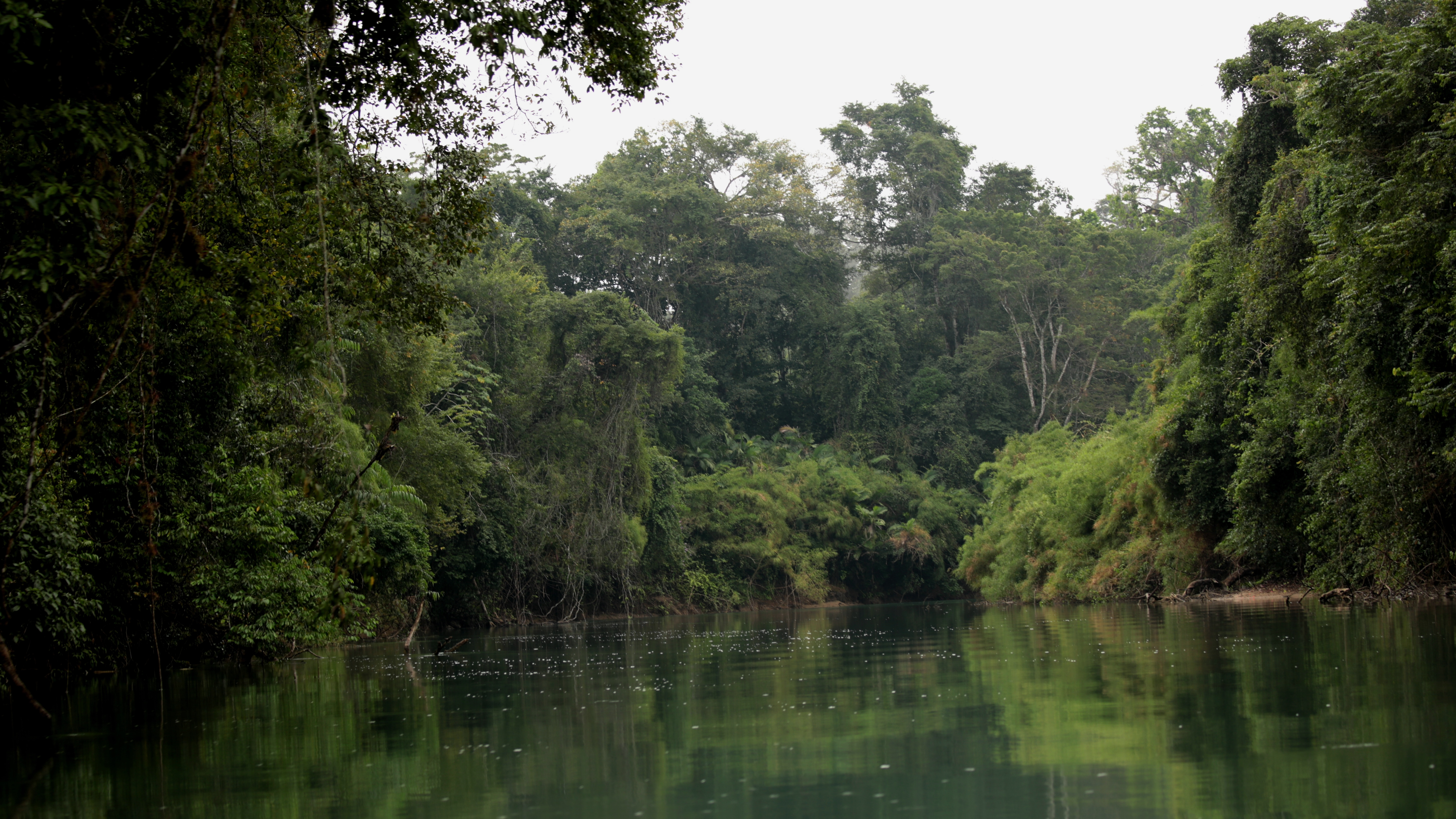
Tzendales River in the Lacandon Jungle, Mexico

== Stela of Tzendales ==
According to the report of Alfred Tozzer he found inside a vaulted chamber a large stone stela with Classic style hieroglyphic inscriptions and the image of a finely attired Maya ruler of which he made sketches in his field notes that were later used as a reference in 1913 by anthropologist Herbert Spinden to illustrate the stela and study its meaning. The inscription of the stela records that on the night of April 11, 691 AD or by its long count date 09.12.19.01. 01 7 imix 13 sip the funerary ceremony of a Tzendales ruler named K'ahk' Witz' K'awiil was held inside his tomb, which according to the stele was named Yej Te' Naah (House of the Sharp Spear), the ceremony was a fire ritual of the classic Maya period (ochi k'ahk' tu mukil) that was performed by a ruler after the death of his predecessor separating his bones and entering with fire to the interior of his tomb. The hieroglyphic inscription narrates this event as: "The fire entered Yej Te' Naah, the tomb in Ju'n Tz'i'nal, of the Ruler of the 1 K'atun, K'ahk' Witz' K'awiil, the ruler of .... (unintelligible glyph which would be the original toponym of Tzendales)".
