= Moral Reforma =

Maya archaeological site in Mexico

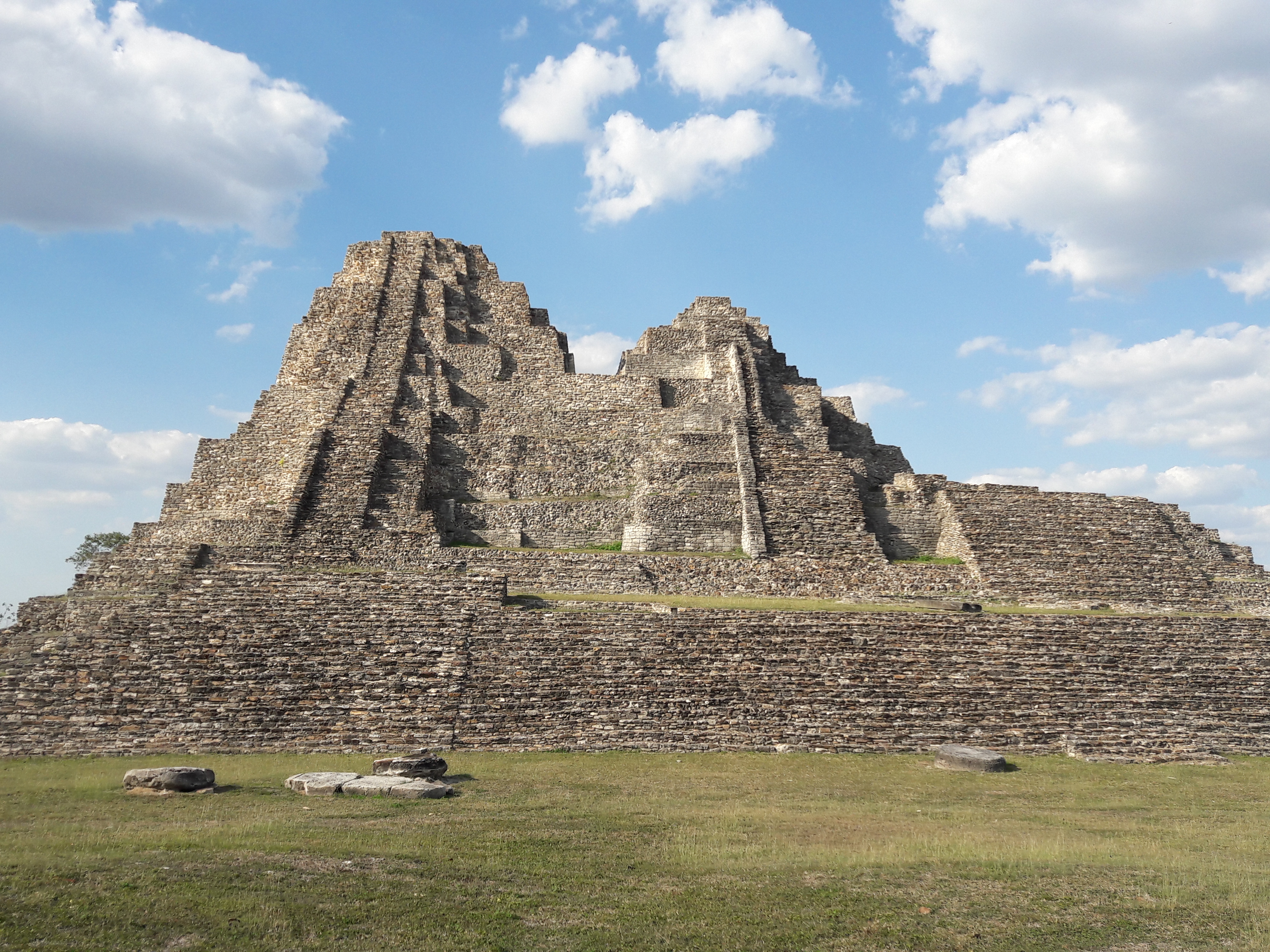
Moral-Reforma, Tabasco, Mexico: main pyramid

Moral-Reforma is a Maya archaeological site in Mexico, about 70 miles (110 km) northeast of Palenque.

== History ==
Yuknoom the Great, the ruler of Calakmul, supervised the accession of six-year-old Muwaan Jol, king of Moral Reforma, in 662 CE. However, in 690 CE this same king was installed under the patronage of K'inich Kan Balam II of Palenque.
