= Degradation of Mayan archeological sites =

Sites of the ancient Maya civilization deteriorate as a result of both environmental and human factors. Archaeologists consider a number of different factors in evaluation site formation processes, site preservation, and site destruction. Deterioration from looting and defacement can destroy vital information. The natural forces of reforestation and erosion can also degrade archeological sites.

== Causes ==
=== Biodegradation ===
Limestone is the dominant material used in Maya architecture, in large part due to its abundance in the region. However, it is a relatively soft stone that can deteriorate easily. Microorganisms on the surface of the limestone create acids that slowly eat away at the stone, creating cracks, fissures and weak points. Over time, biofilms can completely erode the stone.

Many sites are especially prone to the effects of Yucatan’s climate, lending to biodegradation due to a warm, humid and generally equatorial climate. Sites in the Guatemalan highlands and in Chiapas enjoy more alpine and subalpine habitats, with elevations 2600–2800 meters above sea levels. As a result, these sites are less likely to experience biodegradation to the degree that hotter, wetter subtropical climates of the lowland sites do.

=== Rising sea levels ===
Rising sea levels have submerged a number of different sites, such as Stingray Lagoon and Wild Cane Cay, in Belize. At Stingray Lagoon, artifacts related to the production of salt, including pottery used to boil down brine, a process known as sal cocida, were found underwater . Evidence suggests Wild Cane Cay, was used as a trading post with deposits submerged about a meter underwater dating from both the Classic and Post Classic periods. Similarly submerged remains extend about a meter to a meter and a half in depth at other sites in the Port Honduras, suggesting a dramatically different environment at the time of occupation. The speed at which a site becomes inundated can have major effects on the condition of the remains. A gradual rise in water levels partially exposes the remains to erosion through the wave force, and a fast rise in water levels could leave a completely submerged site relatively undamaged. As a result the condition of underwater remains and the amount of decay can infer insights into the location and the cause of its abandonment, however every site is different what can be true of one archeological site may not be true for another.

==== Human Destruction ====
There has been significant intentional destruction of sites through looting. Building materials used for the construction of Colonial-era churches and other buildings were taken from Maya sites. Degradation of Maya sites due to human effects has increased due to tourism. In some cases, outright vandalism, including graffiti, has permanently altered remains. In other cases, erosion due to overuse as thousands of tourists damages sites.
