= Chancala =

Maya archaeological site in Mexico

- Chak K'uh
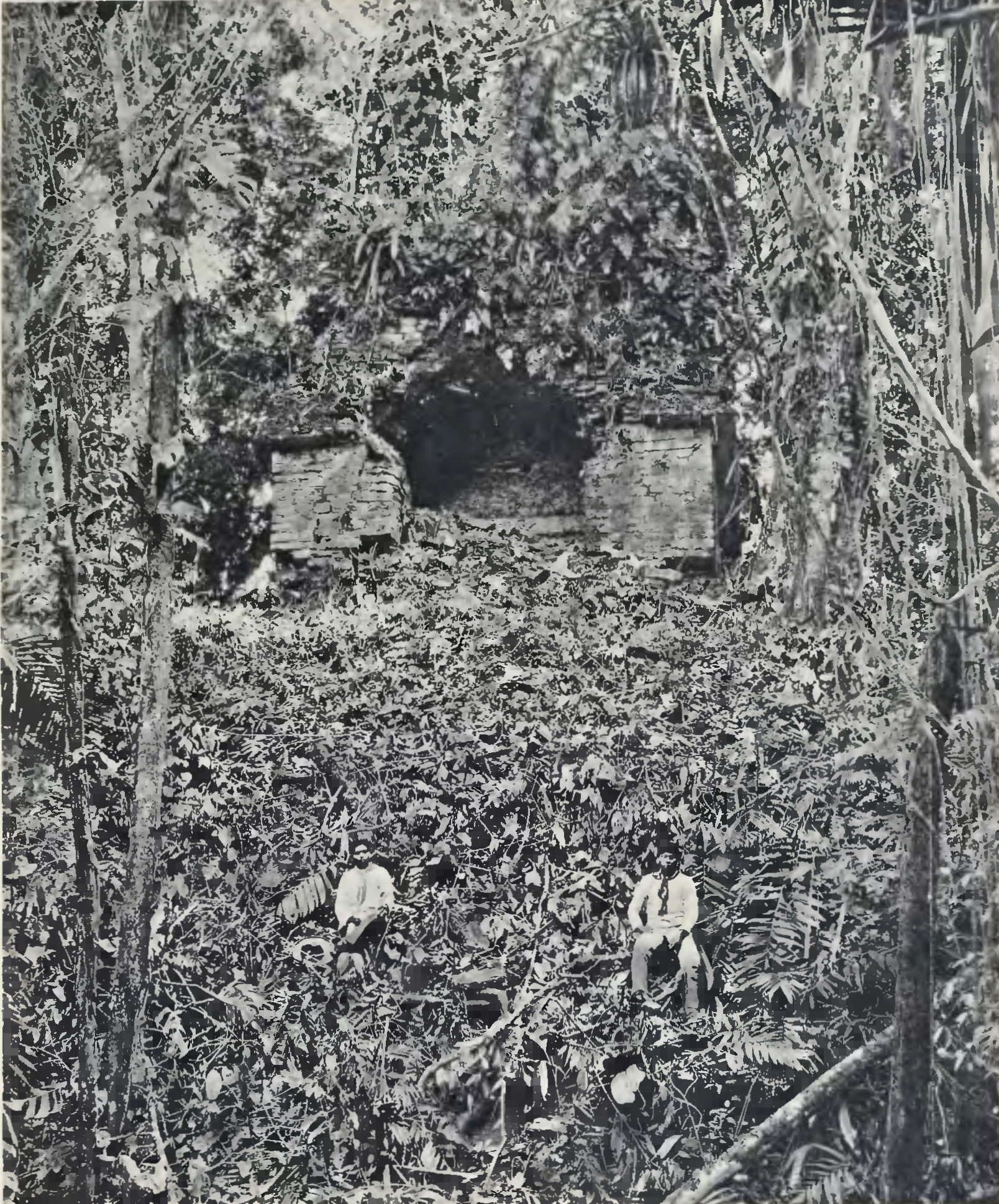
- Pyramid temple at Chancala

- Location within Mexico Location within Chiapas
- Type: Ancient Maya site
- Periods: Late Preclassic - Classic
- Cultures: Maya civilization
- Location: Mexico
- Region: Chiapas

History
- Abandoned: c. 900 AD

Site notes
- Architectural style: Palenque
- Discovered: 1898

Chancala (also known as La Cascada-Chancalá), anciently called Chak K'uh, is a Precolumbian Maya archaeological site located in the municipality of Palenque in the state of Chiapas, Mexico. Chancala was a city of the Classic period of the Maya civilization that had its own dynasty and emblem glyph and developed as an autonomous political power within the region dominated by the great Maya city of Palenque. Chancala contains more than 20 ceremonial structures, including a Palenque-style temple on a six-level pyramid base and a Mesoamerican ballgame court.

== History ==
Chancala was a Maya city-state located in the Palenque region with an occupation dating back to the late Preclassic period of Mesoamerica and had its peak during the Late Classic period until it was abandoned. Chancala had its own ruling dynasty and emblem glyph, and the city was originally called Chak K'uh, demonstrating that it may have had some autonomy from Palenque despite being located a few kilometers to the south. An ancient sacbe road has been found connecting Chancala with a smaller Maya site called San Juan Chancalaíto, showing the political connections and interactions the city had during its Precolumbian occupation.

A panel with Late Classic Maya hieroglyphic inscriptions found at Chancalá records that the ruler named Yax K'oj Ahk witnessed the Maya calendar day of 4 ajaw 8 kumk'uj, a period-ending date with ceremonial significance as it is linked to the mythological date of creation. The archaeological researchers have identified that Lord Yax K'oj Ahk was one of the most important rulers of Chancala.

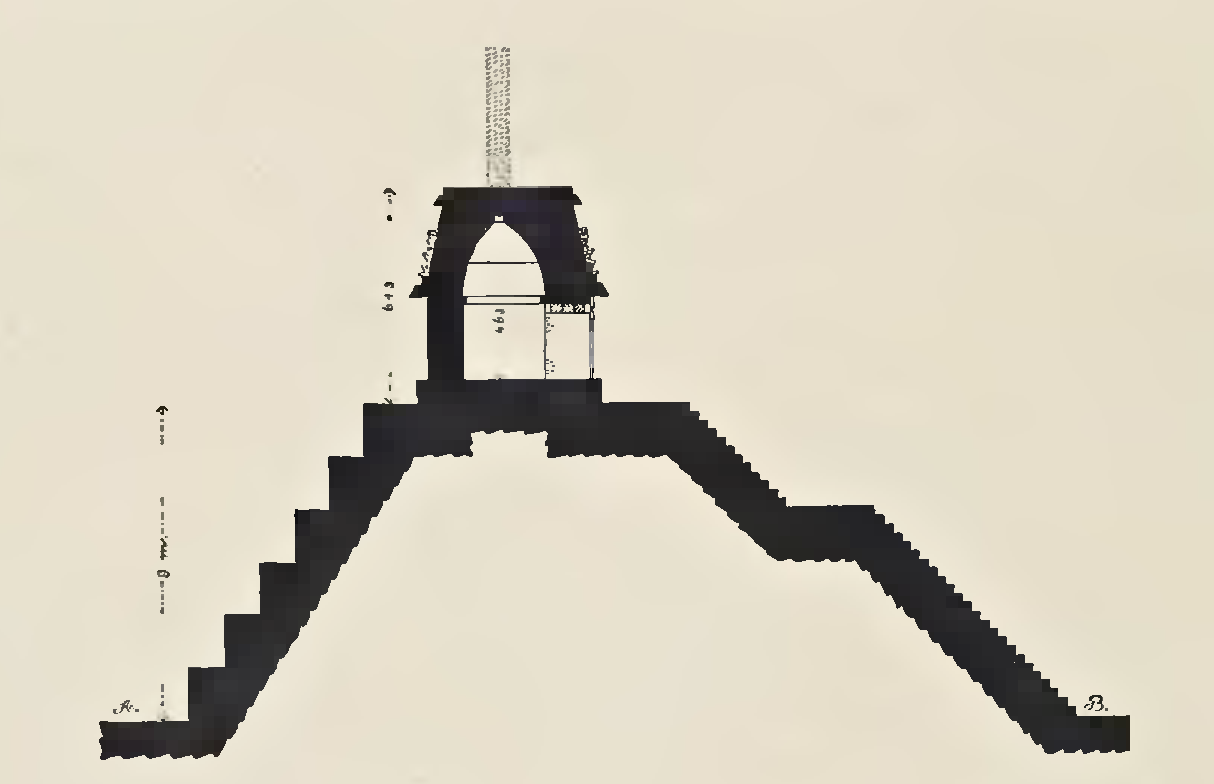
Illustration of the main temple of Chancala by Teobert Maler.

Chancala was discovered in 1898 by archaeologist Teoberto Maler during an archaeological expedition at the Palenque region. After discovering several archaeological sites, he found the ruins of a medium-sized site, which he named Chancala in reference to a river near the discovery. In his archaeological report, Maler described the site having numerous structures and the existence of a stepped pyramidal base with a one-room ceremonial temple at the top with remains of red paint and hieroglyphic writing on the exterior wall. He also made a detailed plan of the structure and took photographs of the main temple and the Welib Ja waterfall. Nowadays, the archaeological site of Chancala is completely buried under thick jungle inside a ejido.
