= Chactún =

Archaeological site in Mexico

Coordinates: 18°43′16.8″N 89°31′33.6″W

Chactún (Maya: Red stone) is the name of an archaeological site of the Mesoamerican Maya civilization in the state of Campeche, Mexico, in the northern part of the Calakmul Biosphere Reserve. The site of approximately 54 acres (22 ha) is located in the lowlands of the Yucatán Peninsula, between the regions of Rio Bec and Chenes. There are some significant differences that have yet to be explained completely, which distinguish it from some of the other nearby sites.

== Discovery ==
A team of Mexican and foreign experts from the Research Center of the Slovenian Academy of Sciences and Arts (ZRC SAZU) and Universidad Nacional Autónoma de México (UNAM), headed by archaeologist Ivan Sprajc, discovered the site in 2013 by aerial photographs and named it Chactún, "Red Stone". The name was based on an inscription which translated to "K'inich B'ahlam erected the Great Red Stone in (what would have been AD 751)". The project was financed by the National Geographic Society and Villas and Ars Longa, two private companies, and supported by National Institute of Anthropology and History, Mexico. It is one of 80 sites detected by the Southeast Campeche Archaeological Reconnaissance Project, which launched in 1996. Prior to this discovery by archaeologists, very little was known about this part of the region. Evidence of logging suggests locals were aware of the site. This is because of the difficulty in accessing the area due to difficult terrain and overgrown vegetation. To reach the area, the team of archaeologists spent four weeks reopening an abandoned and heavily overgrown dirt-road. Without the discovery with aerial photography, it is likely this site would have remained hidden for much longer. The project surveyed the three urban cores of the site to create maps and three dimensional models. Further research based on airborne laser (lidar) scanning of the surrounding area of about 240 sq km revealed a thoroughly modified cultural landscape, with a number of residential clusters and extensive landscape modifications related to water management and intensive agriculture.

== Ancient use ==
Chactún is believed to have been an ancient city that served as a government seat for a large area. The researchers dated the site to 600 to 900 AD. The site contains three complexes of monumental architecture. The West Complex is the largest one, making up about half of the total area of the site. There are many pyramids throughout the site, with the tallest one reaching a height of 23 meters (75 ft), as well as two ball courts, a number of large palace-like buildings surrounding several plazas, and various residential areas. There are also many sculpted stone stelae and altars. While some of them are plain and others eroded, a few monuments have well preserved reliefs, including hieroglyphic inscriptions. A unique case is a standing stela with remnants of stucco glyphs attached to the stone.

There is also evidence that the site may have been inhabited by a different group after the collapse of the Maya. There are several monuments that were turned upside down as though the people living there did not understand their significance, but there is also evidence that the reused monuments were worshiped up to the Postclassic period, as indicated by some ceramic offerings. A significant amount of artifacts dating to these second inhabitants were found in the ball court areas.

== See also ==
- List of Maya sites
