= Tenam Puente =

Archaeological site in Chiapas, Mexico

- Interactive map of Tenam Puente
- 16°7′59″N 92°5′50″W
- Type: Cultural
- Periods: 300–1200 AD, Classic and Early Postclassic
- Cultures: Maya
- Location: Chiapas, Mexico

Site notes
- Area: 30 ha (74 acres)

Tenam Puente (Tenam Puente Archaeological Zone) is an archaeological site of the Maya culture located in the Balum Canan valley, in the municipality of La Trinitaria, 12 kilometers south of Comitán, Chiapas, in Mexico. It is accessed by a deviation from Federal Highway 190 that leads to La Trinitaria.

== Etymology ==
The word Tenam is a hybrid toponymic: Tenam derives from the Nahuatl tenamitl which means 'wall' or 'fortress', while the word Puente alludes to the name of an old farm existing at the beginning of the 20th century, whose land today constitutes the Francisco Sarabia ejido, where this attraction is now located.

== History ==
Although the site dates back to the classic period (between 300 and 600 AD), everything indicates that its main period of occupation corresponds to the early Postclassic (approximately between 900 and 1200 AD), when the Mayan sites of the central area were abandoned, which today occupies the department of Petén, in Guatemala.

The site represents the transition from the Classic Period to the Postclassic, being one of the least studied stages of Chiapas archaeology.

It was contemporary with the splendor of the Toltec culture of Chichén-Itzá. The last date of registration of the place is around the year 874 AD.

The Mayan collapse in the 9th century was far more detrimental to lowland Maya centers such as Palenque and Yaxchilán, than smaller highland centers like Tenam Puente. In fact, the highland cities that survived the initial collapse may even have benefited from the abrupt decline of their lowland competitors. Tenam Puente, as well as nearby Chinkultic, were a modest power on the western fringe of the Maya world's highlands, and appear to have survived until around 1200 AD, before finally being abandoned, for reasons that are still unclear.

=== Trade ===
The strategic location of Tenam Puente allowed its inhabitants to have access to and exercise control over the route of the important commercial networks that linked the highlands of Chiapas and Guatemala with the central depression of Chiapas. The ceramic collections from the site's excavations show a very active trade with other areas far removed from the Comitán region, such as snails from the Gulf of Mexico.

On the other hand, the discovered burials show the presence of great characters to whom numerous offerings were deposited, such as vessels, jade objects (ya'ax chich'), ornaments made of shell and spine of stingray. Thanks to all these excavations, burials and explorations.

With the findings, it has been possible to confirm that Tenam Puente participated in the last stage of the Classic Mayan culture, which represents the transition to the Early Postclassic, when the metallurgy becomes stronger and objects made of alabaster appear.

== Scans ==
Tenam Puente was mentioned for the first time in the book Tribes and Temples, edited by Frans Blom and Oliver La Farge in 1928.

== Description ==
The archaeological zone of Tenam Puente was built in the southern border area of the Mayan zone, in a strategic position on a mountain with a series of calcareous hills that divide the Altos Orientales with the Central Depression of Chiapas, about 1,600 to 1,700 m above sea level, which dominates the entire comiteca plain that extends to the Montebello Lakes, in the east of the state of Chiapas.

Tenam Puente was built on large and spectacular platforms with monumental retaining walls, access to which is restricted as you go up. These large walls were arranged on five slopes, thus forming open and closed squares on which the main buildings were distributed, some of which have stone ramps in the form of buttresss as a characteristic element.

The nuclear zone of the settlement is made up of a little more than 60 structures distributed in a territorial extension of approximately 30 hectares.

Most of the buildings and the most important are on the north side, in what is called the Acropolis, with its structures 4 and 7, it is the highest point of this site, which offers good views throughout the area . For the construction of the Acropolis, it was necessary to level the hills by means of high and long terraces built at different levels, which decrease in size and height as you go up. The upper terraces, up to 20 meters high, are formed by stepped bodies. The buildings were built around a series of patios and plazas.

Another group to the south corresponds to temples and residences of the upper classes, distributed around closed squares, with shrines, squares and patios that were delimited by various constructions, as well as platforms with large rooms on top.

In the surroundings of Tenam Puente are the vestiges of the old population, although very modified by the current agricultural work.

The spatial composition of the buildings in the area is very similar to the architecture of other Mayan sites in the Central Depression of Chiapas (semi-flat area bordered by the Sierra Madre de Chiapas, the Central Plateau and the Northern Mountains), on the bed of the Grijalva River and its tributaries, a large number of sites with very similar architectural characteristics and construction techniques are distributed, based on blocks of limestone perfectly cut and assembled without mortar and without lime.

The finishes were applied with stucco, which is still preserved in some walls, floors and stairss, you can also see some stone lajas floors.

Like many sites in the Chiapas highlands, Tenam Puente is notable for its lack of ornamentation, such as arches, corbelss, and crestings. In the same way, only one stele has been found dated with the year 790, which is kept in the archaeological museum of Tuxtla Gutiérrez.
