= Tamchen =

Ancient Maya city in Yucatán Peninsula, Mexico

Tamchen is an ancient Maya city, located in the Yucatán Peninsula, Mexico. It was discovered in August 2014, along with Lagunita, by Ivan Sprajc, associate professor at the Research Center of the Slovenian Academy of Sciences and Arts, and his team, after they reviewed aerial photographs of the area.
