= Campeche (city) =

San Francisco de Campeche
- City
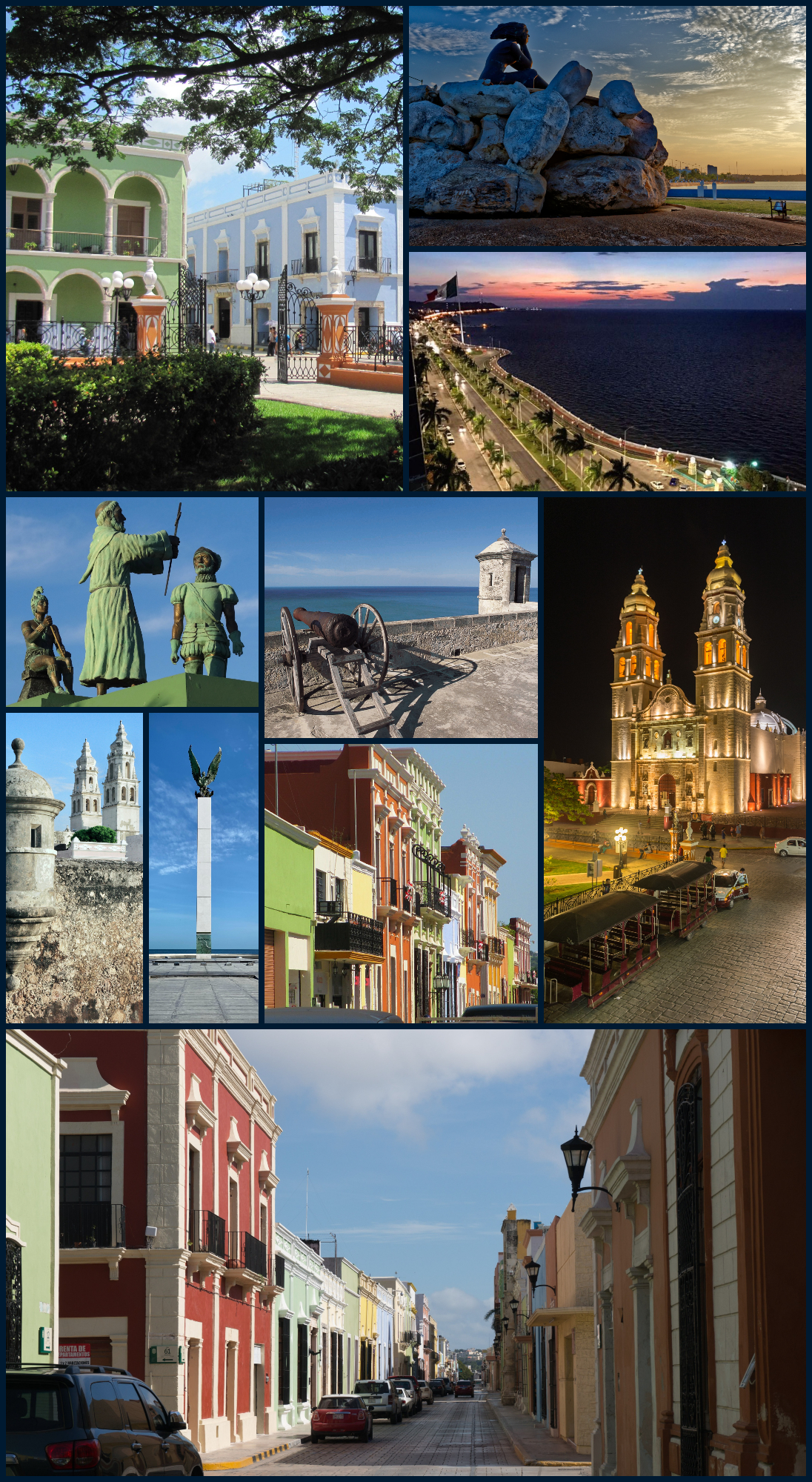
- Clockwise from top: Historic Center of San Francisco de Campeche; Monumento la novia del mar; Malecón of the city of Campeche; Monument to Hispanidad; Fort of San Miguel; Parish of Our Lady of the Immaculate Conception Holy Cathedral Church; Colonial architecture; The Mayan Angel; View of the cathedral of campeche from the fortress; Historic Center of San Francisco de Campeche

- Coat of arms

- Location within Campeche Location within Mexico
- Coordinates: 19°51′0″N 90°31′50″W
- Country: Mexico
- State: Campeche
- Municipality: Campeche
- Founded: October 4, 1540 (486 years ago)

Government
  - Mayor: Biby Karen Rabelo de la Torre (2021-2024)

Area
  - Total: 52.48 km^{2} (20.26 sq mi)
- Elevation: 10 m (33 ft)

Population (2020 census)
  - Total: 249,623
  - Density: 4,757/km^{2} (12,320/sq mi)
- Demonym: Campechano
- Time zone: UTC−6 (Central)
- Postal code: 24000 - 24576
- Area code: 981
- Major Airport: Ing. Alberto Acuña Ongay International Airport
- IATA Code: CPE
- ICAO Code: MMCP
- Website: Official Campeche Website

UNESCO World Heritage Site
- Official name: Historic Fortified Town of Campeche
- Type: Cultural
- Criteria: ii, iv
- Designated: 1999 (23rd session)
- Reference no.: 895
- Region: Latin America and the Caribbean

San Francisco de Campeche (pronounced [saɱ fɾanˈsisko ðe kamˈpetʃe]; Yucatec Maya: Ahk'ìin Pech, pronounced [aχkʼiːn˥˧ pʰetʃ]), 19th c., also known simply as Campeche, is the capital and largest city of the Mexican state of Campeche, and the seat of Campeche Municipality. It is located on the shore of the Bay of Campeche in the Gulf of Mexico. The city had a population of 220,389 in the 2010 census, while the municipality had a population of 259,005.

The city was founded in 1540 by Spanish conquistadores as San Francisco de Campeche atop the pre-existing Maya city of Can Pech. Little trace remains of the Pre-Columbian city.

The city retains many of the old colonial Spanish city walls and fortifications which protected the city from pirates and buccaneers. The state of preservation and quality of its architecture earned it the status of a World Heritage Site in 1999. Campeche is (along with Quebec City) one of the only cities in North America with most of its historic old city walls intact. Originally, the Spaniards lived inside the walled city, while the indigenous Maya people lived in the surrounding barrios of San Francisco, Guadalupe, and San Román. These barrios still retain their original churches; the one in Guadalupe is almost 500 years old.

== History ==
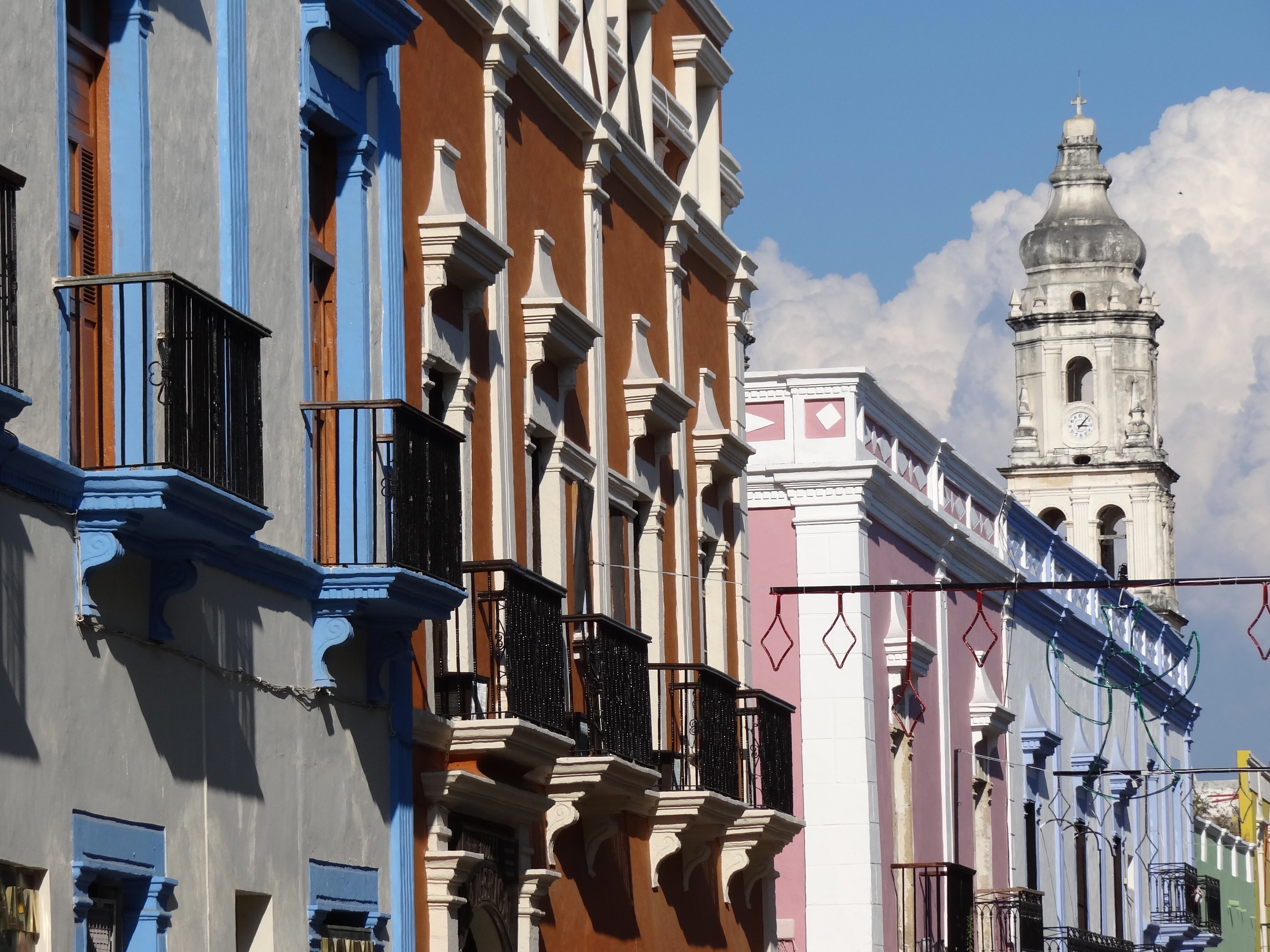
Façades of colonial buildings with the city's cathedral visible

The modern city of San Francisco de Campeche was founded in 1540 by Francisco de Montejo upon the site of Can Pech, the former capital city of a Maya chiefdom. The city of Campeche was terrorized by pirates and marauders (such as the 1633 Sack of Campeche and the 1663 Sack of Campeche) until the city constructed major fortifications. The fortifications were started in 1686 and completed in 1704.

=== First expedition ===
The Hernández de Córdoba expedition of 1517 was the first Spanish expedition to reach Campeche, and its members were among the first Europeans to set foot on the Yucatán Peninsula. The expedition left the island of Cuba on February 8 and reached Isla Mujeres and Cabo Catoche in early March. They continued westward around the peninsula. Bernal Díaz del Castillo was the only member of that expedition to write an account of these events. In his account, he wrote that on Sunday March 22, they sighted and debarked at a village on the coast. This village was Can Pech, the capital of the Maya city-state of the same name. This happened to be the day of veneration of Saint Lazarus of Bardiaboch, which is why Hernández de Córdoba baptized the place with that name.

In need of water, the Spaniards landed and supplied themselves from a well. As the Mayans approached, the Spaniards indicated by means of signs that they came in peace; the Maya chief asked them if they came from where the sun rises, mentioning the word "castilán". The Spaniards, surprised to hear this word, responded affirmatively, and the chief invited them to his city, where copal was lit. By means of signs, the Maya chief indicated to the expeditionaries that they should leave the city before the fire went out. Meanwhile, Mayan warriors were arriving at the place. Based on their recent experience at Cabo Catoche, the Spanish decided to leave. They would later encounter rough seas which caused them to lose the water they had just collected. This in turn forced them to land at Chakán Putum, where a fierce battle between Mayans and Spaniards took place.

=== Conquest ===
After the Spanish conquest of the Aztec Empire, Francisco de Montejo requested permission from Charles V to conquer the Yucatán Peninsula. In 1526, the Spanish crown granted Montejo the title of "Adelantado, governor, sheriff and captain general of Yucatan". His conquest of Chakán Putum and Can Pech were part of the Spanish conquest of Yucatán, which was carried out in three stages.

In the first stage (1527 to 1529), Montejo ventured along the eastern coast of the peninsula with the help of the captain Alonso Dávila, whom he had known since Cortes' expedition, but they were repelled by the Maya.

In the second stage (1530-1535), Montejo ventured into the west, where he founded "Salamanca de Campeche" in 1531. Montejo sent Alonso Dávila to cross the peninsula south, where he founded "Villa Real" in Bacalar, but this position soon had to be abandoned. Montejo's son was defeated in battle at Chichén Itzá towards the end of 1534, after which the Spaniards abandoned the peninsula for five years.

In the third stage (1540-1547), Montejo arrived in Ciudad Real de Chiapa (San Cristóbal de las Casas) in 1540, where he gave instructions to Francisco Gil to be in charge of Champotón. In 1546, when the conquest of Yucatan seemed to be over, Montejo and his wife traveled to San Francisco de Campeche to meet with his son and his nephew. The Maya had organized in secret, and a great rebellion broke out on the night of 8 November 1546 (5 Cimi 19 Xul, end of the Mesoamerican Long Count calendar). Montejo's son and nephew took up arms to end the rebellions the following year.

=== Viceroyalty period ===
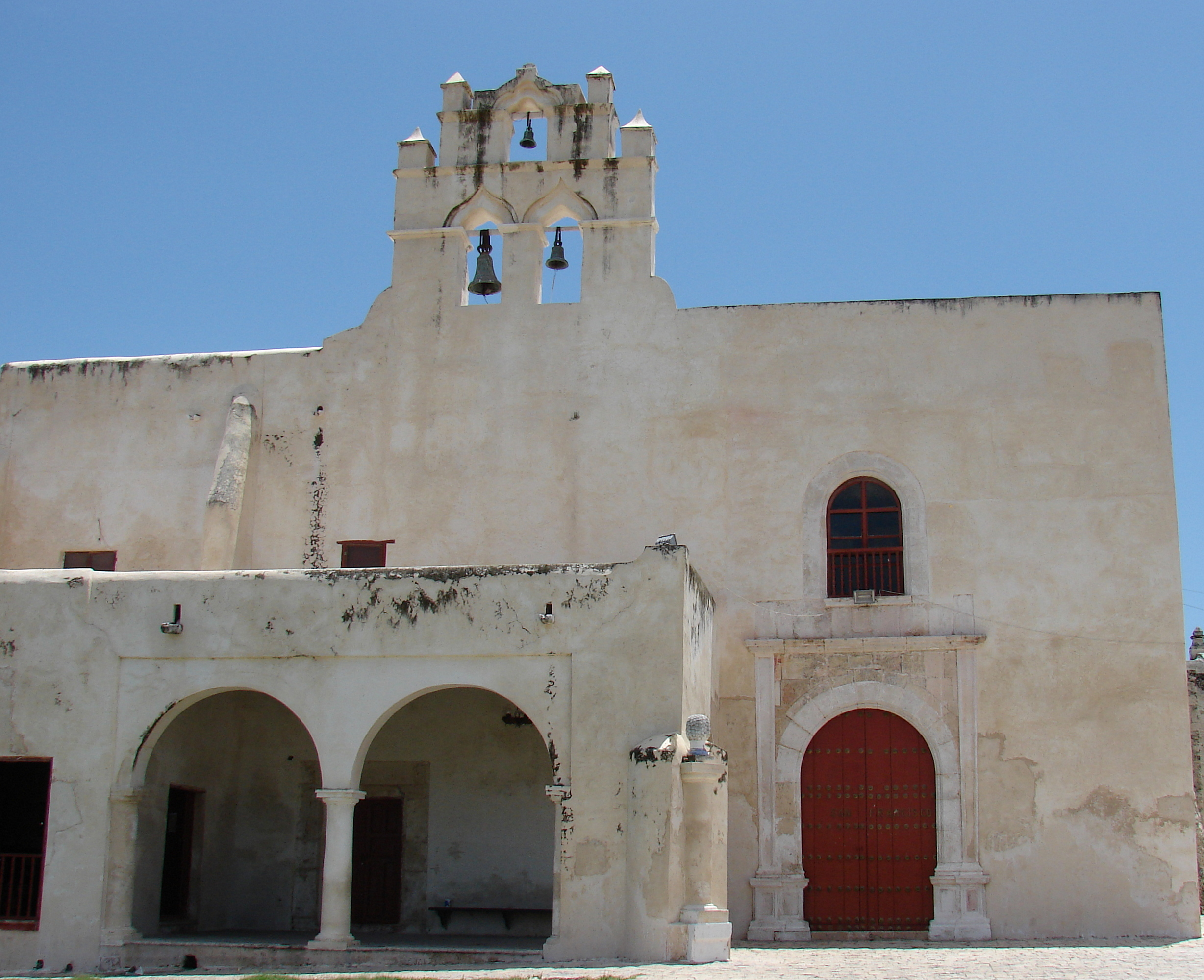
The Temple and Convent of San Francisco (1540) — one of the oldest in the Americas — built on the site of the first mass in mainland Mexico in 1517

Like most cities constructed by the Spanish conquistadors, the city of Campeche was designed in a standard military fashion based on a grid plan, with a Plaza de Armas near its center. Around this main square were located the Campeche Cathedral, the Royal Audience and the houses of the highest-ranking officials. A pillory—a column that served as a symbol of Spanish power and justice—stood in the center of the plaza. The jail, the municipal palace and the defense tower would be built soon after. The market was located around a smaller plaza.

The Spanish residents lived and worked near the main square, in the current neighborhood of San Román, while the indigenous Maya people lived in the old pre-Hispanic settlements—currently the neighborhoods of San Francisco and Siete de Agosto. The Naboríos, indigenous Mexicans who arrived with the conquistadors, occupied the San Román neighborhood, while the slaves from Africa lived in the neighborhoods of Santa Ana and Santa Lucía.

The city served as the base of operations for the conquest of the rest of Yucatán (1542–1546), beginning with the occupation of Ti'ho, an abandoned settlement of the Mayan Itza people, where the Spanish founded Mérida, the provincial capital, in 1542.

The armed conquest was followed by an ideological conquest which consisted of the indoctrination of the Maya people with European cultural ideology, particularly that of the Catholic religion. The first religious order that arrived in Campeche was that of the Franciscans, who arrived in Campeche in 1535. They were soon forced to leave due to a series of difficulties raised by both indigenous and Spanish people, but they returned in 1540. That year, they began the construction of a temple and convent dedicated to San Francisco. The Franciscans evangelized throughout the Yucatán Peninsula with no competition from other religious orders, such as the Jesuits or the Dominicans were competing for the territory from that point forward.

In 1542, the king proclaimed the calls New Laws, which established the freedom of the Indians as subjects of the Crown. Slavery was legally abolished, but would continue by other means. The parcel subject a certain number of peoples to a Spaniard, to whom they had to pay in kind (wax, cotton blankets) and labor. Those who were not entrusted were under the royal jurisdiction and received the name of "peoples of the Royal Crown." The indigenous tributaries of the encomiendas español, continued to suffer a treatment that was practically slavery. The friars of the different religious orders present fought to defend the rights of the indigenous people, preserve their freedom and limit the abuses of the conquerors. Thanks to this, in 1547, Felipe II of Spain issued a royal identity card in favor of the personal freedom of the natives, and to make sure that their interests were fulfilled, he created a City Hall Mayor for the province of Yucatán.

==== Trade and piracy ====
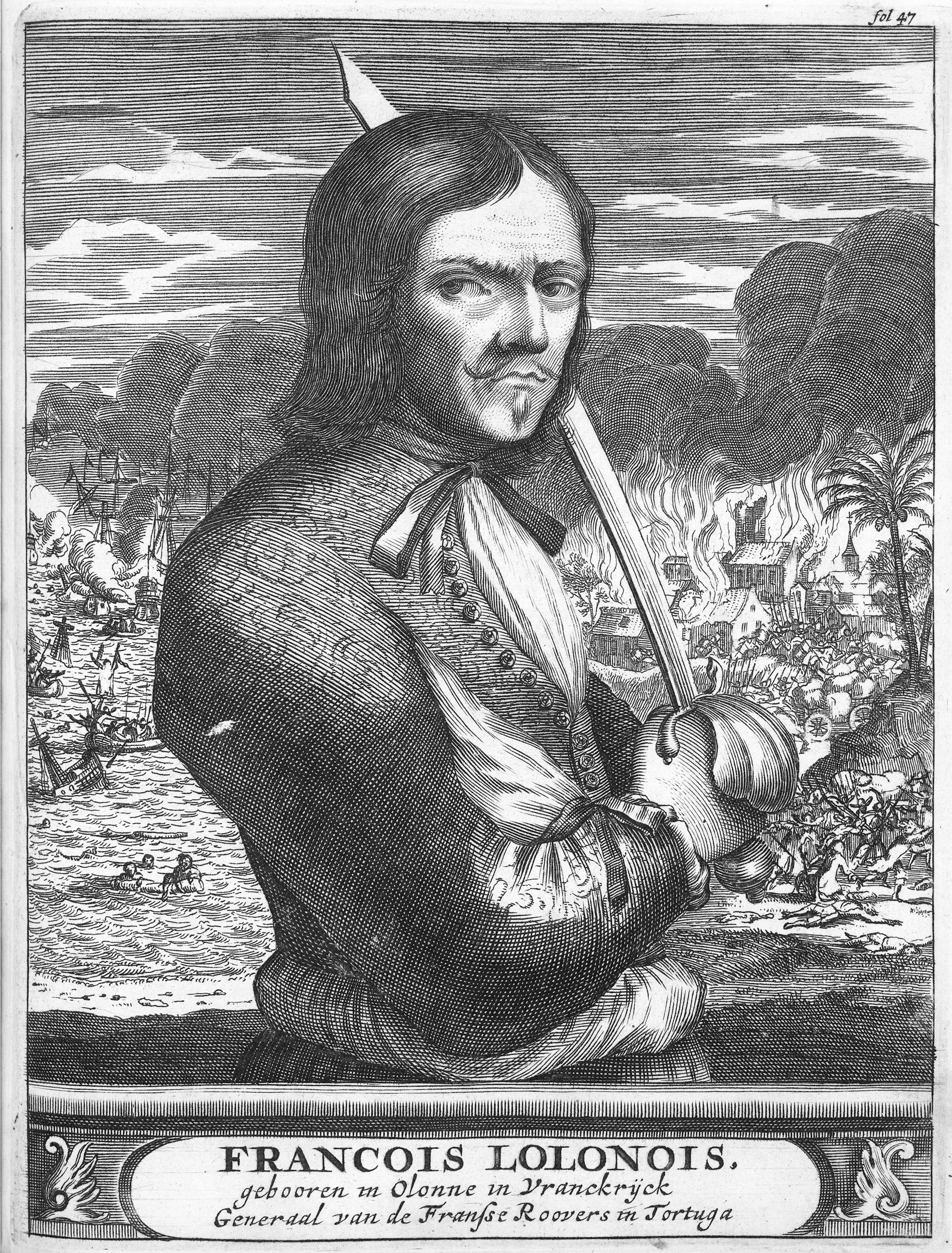
Jean David Nau aka El Olonés

Campeche's position in the Gulf of Mexico made it the main port of the Yucatan Peninsula, standing out as a point of connection with the foreigner, which allowed the economic boom and population growth. From there, from early times, the cargoes of the so-called palo de Campeche, also known as "dye stick", a native product of the region that would lead to large estates, among which are counted, Uayamón, Xanabchakán and Mucuychacán, to mention three of them, and also of salt. The port of Campeche also gained fame for its Shipyards industry.

The commercial monopoly of Spain, implemented by the House of Hiring of the Indies to their domains, which prohibited them from trading even among themselves and with other nations, led to illegal practices such as piracy. One of the measures to stop them was promulgated in 1616 by the Mayor of Yucatan Luis de Céspedes y Oviedo, which involved the creation of a license on the cutting and trade of the Campeche stick, as well Like new taxes. This first measure was insufficient and counterproductive, because far from bringing down piracy, he encouraged it. In 1629, the King of Spain Felipe IV created a navy coast guard to protect trade, but this measure also did not give the expected results, neither did the military garrison to protect the city implanted by Mayor Centeno Maldonado. The constant pressures from other European nations and the continuing uprisings in their Dutch positions made it impossible to adopt new measures against piracy, which remained in full swing.

Among the pirates most famous that docked at Campeche are John Hawkins, Francis Drake, Laurens de Graaf, Cornelius Jol, Jacobo Jackson, Michel de Grandmont, Portuguese Bartholomew, William Parker, Jean David Nau, Edward Mansvelt, Henry Morgan, Lewis Scot, Roche Brasiliano and Jean Lafitte. On January 27, 1661, a fleet of filibusters appeared in the port of San Francisco de Campeche and, although it did not disembark, looted two well-loaded commercial frigates, which barely arrived and then quietly withdrew, without being chased, because that day there was no armed ship in the bay capable of hunting him. The head of this filibuster expedition was called Henry Morgan.

A very feared pirate in the town of Campeche was Laurens de Graaf or Lorencillo, who was Dutch and had served the king of Spain fighting filibusters. But then he also dedicated himself to piracy. In 1685 he attacked and took the town of Campeche and twenty other towns in the area. He spent two months and captured so many prisoners and stole so many jewels and pieces of silver that filled the cargo of his ship. He was chased by three Spanish frigates with cannons. The pirate dodged the attacks, threw the entire load into the sea so that the ship achieved greater speed and, with wind in favor, moved away quickly.

Another pirate was El Olonés whose real name was Jean David Nau. He committed innumerable and famous attacks against the Spanish viceregency on the mainland. In a terrible storm, he lost his ship on the coast of Campeche. All the men were saved, but, arriving on land, the Spanish pursued them, killing most of them and wounding El Olonés. Needing to escape, he saved his life through a ploy: he took handfuls of sand, mixed it with the blood from his wounds and smeared his face and other parts of his body. Then, hiding with great skill among the dead, he remained motionless until the Spaniards left the battlefield. When they were gone, he retired to the forest, cleaned his wounds and took care of them until healed and then headed to the City of Campeche perfectly disguised. In the city, he spoke with certain slaves to whom he promised freedom if they obeyed him. They accepted his promises and stealing a canoe at night, threw themselves into the sea with El Olonés.

==== Elevation to city status ====
The coat of arms held by the city of San Francisco de Campeche was granted in 1777 by the king of Spain Carlos III, being elevated from the title of villa to that of city.

Before the current shield was adopted, there was a process to constitute a shield as an officer. The first project was presented in 1772 before the possible elevation to the title of city of the town of San Francisco de Campeche, when requested by the Cabildo de Campeche in a contest for the election of shield de Armas. The first design was submitted by Juan Antonio Rexo and Peñuelas on September 24 of that year but was rejected on October 17 for not being subject to the rules of heraldry. Ramón Zazo and Ortega subsequently presented three projects; the first two were rejected but finally the third was approved in council on November 7, 1777. The shield was approved by his majesty Carlos III of Spain with the certificate of: "the City Title is granted to the town of San Francisco de Campeche."

== Climate ==
Campeche has a tropical savanna climate (Köppen climate classification Aw), with most rain falling in the wet season from June to October.

Climate data for Campeche (1991–2020)
Month	Jan	Feb	Mar	Apr	May	Jun	Jul	Aug	Sep	Oct	Nov	Dec	Year
Record high °C (°F)	38.8 (101.8)	39.0 (102.2)	42.7 (108.9)	44.0 (111.2)	45.1 (113.2)	43.0 (109.4)	40.0 (104.0)	40.0 (104.0)	39.0 (102.2)	40.5 (104.9)	38.0 (100.4)	40.0 (104.0)	45.1 (113.2)
Mean daily maximum °C (°F)	29.1 (84.4)	31.1 (88.0)	33.0 (91.4)	35.3 (95.5)	36.0 (96.8)	34.8 (94.6)	34.8 (94.6)	34.4 (93.9)	33.6 (92.5)	32.1 (89.8)	30.6 (87.1)	29.5 (85.1)	32.9 (91.2)
Daily mean °C (°F)	23.7 (74.7)	25.1 (77.2)	26.8 (80.2)	28.9 (84.0)	30.0 (86.0)	29.4 (84.9)	29.1 (84.4)	28.9 (84.0)	28.5 (83.3)	27.3 (81.1)	25.5 (77.9)	24.2 (75.6)	27.3 (81.1)
Mean daily minimum °C (°F)	18.3 (64.9)	19.2 (66.6)	20.5 (68.9)	22.4 (72.3)	23.9 (75.0)	23.9 (75.0)	23.4 (74.1)	23.3 (73.9)	23.4 (74.1)	22.5 (72.5)	20.5 (68.9)	19.0 (66.2)	21.7 (71.1)
Record low °C (°F)	8.0 (46.4)	9.0 (48.2)	10.0 (50.0)	13.0 (55.4)	16.0 (60.8)	17.0 (62.6)	18.0 (64.4)	19.0 (66.2)	18.0 (64.4)	15.0 (59.0)	12.0 (53.6)	9.0 (48.2)	8.0 (46.4)
Average precipitation mm (inches)	27.6 (1.09)	20.0 (0.79)	9.4 (0.37)	18.9 (0.74)	56.5 (2.22)	214.5 (8.44)	173.5 (6.83)	219.1 (8.63)	202.7 (7.98)	163.5 (6.44)	39.8 (1.57)	33.0 (1.30)	1,178.5 (46.40)
Average precipitation days (≥ 0.1 mm)	4.8	2.9	2.1	1.7	5.0	13.9	13.9	15.4	15.5	12.0	5.9	4.6	97.7
Average relative humidity (%)	74	71	68	66	64	68	74	76	78	77	77	75	72
Mean monthly sunshine hours	216	200	264	267	254	237	241	236	202	208	194	177	2,696
Source 1: Servicio Meteorológico National (humidity 1981–2000)
Source 2: Deutscher Wetterdienst (sun, 1961–1990) (Note: Station ID for Campeche, CAMP. is 76695 Use this station ID to locate the sunshine duration)

== Demographics ==
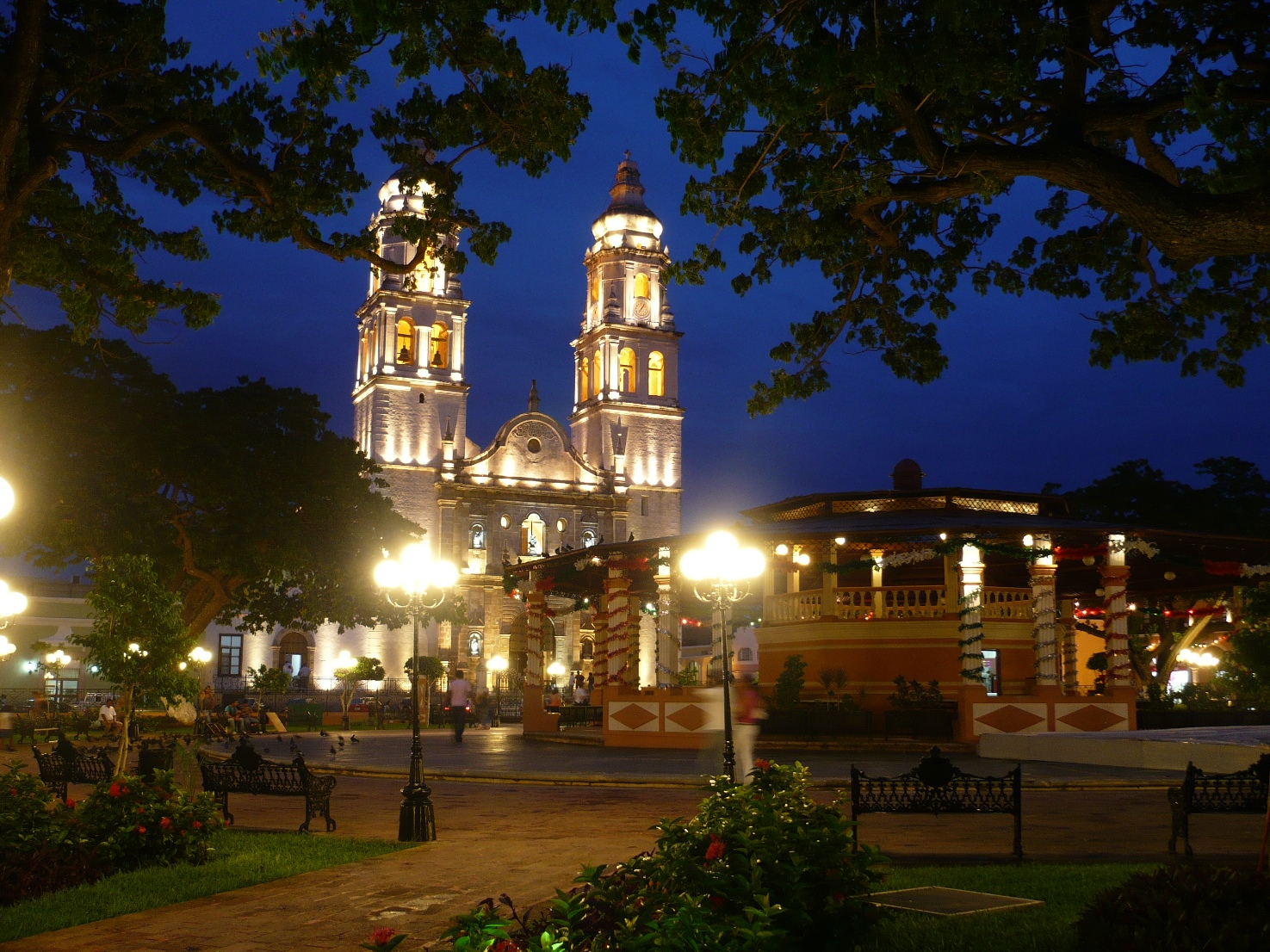
Independence Park

As of 2010, the municipality had a total population of 259,005.

The municipal seat, and largest settlement, is the city of San Francisco de Campeche (often shortened to Campeche). As of 2010, the city had a population of 220,389.

Aside from the municipal seat, the municipality has 564 localities.

The largest localities are, (with 2010 populations in parentheses): Lerma (8,281), Chiná (5,194), classified as urban, and Los Laureles (2,251), Alfredo V. Bonfil (2,060), Pich (1,756), Tikinmul (1,663), Imí (1,227), Hampolol (1,123), Castamay (1,101), and San Francisco Kobén (1,045), classified as rural.

== Economy ==
The economy of San Francisco de Campeche is based primarily on the services sector: commerce, tourism, communications, public administration, public services. There are also various maquiladoras textiles installed in the city, and small and medium-sized enterprises generally associated with the exploitation of primary products, forming the secondary sector. The primary sector persists through fishing activity.

=== Tourism ===
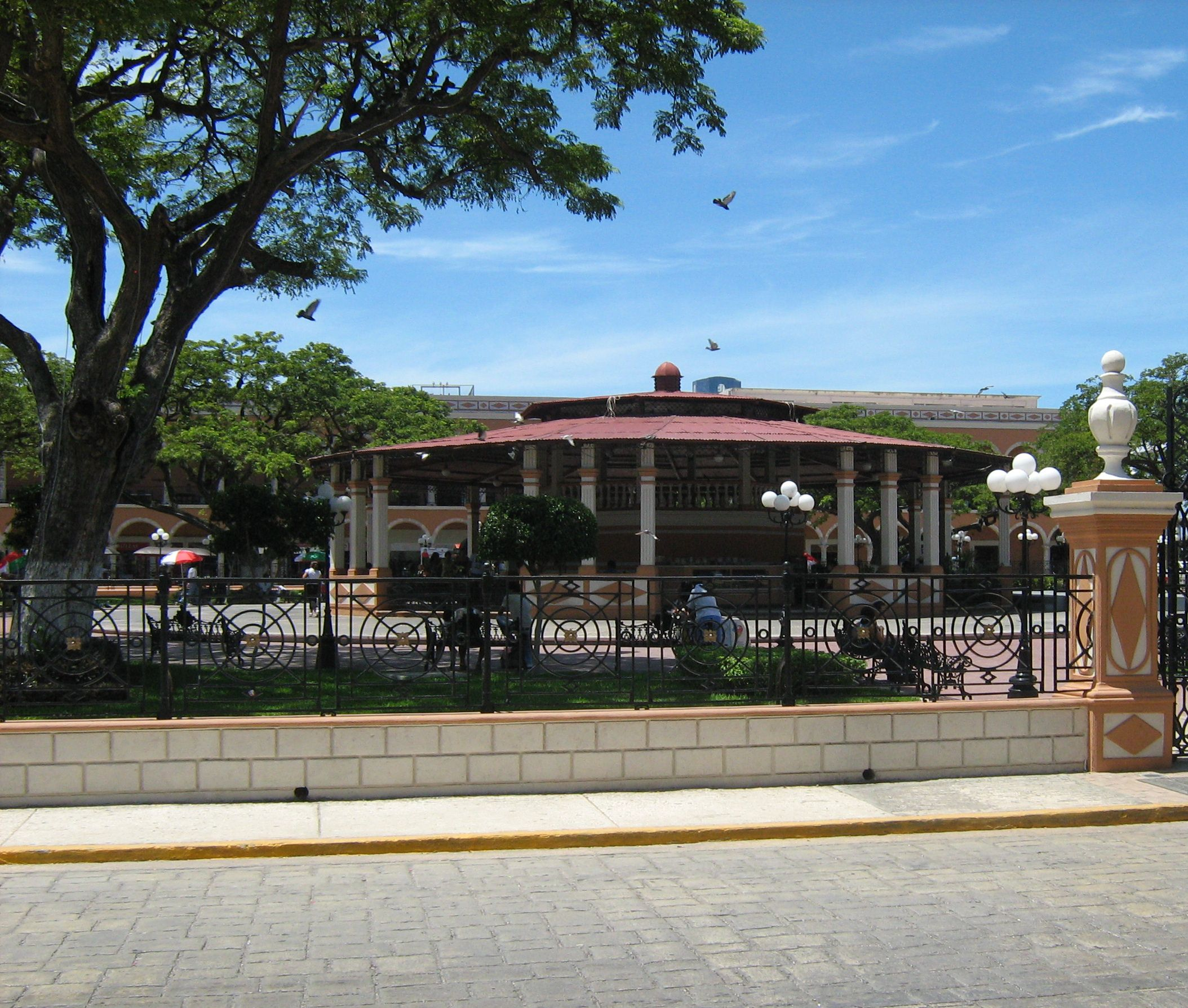
Plaza de la Independencia.

In recent years tourism has had a strong boost in the State of Campeche. Underpinning the tourist activity the emblematic places in the capital city are:

==== Downtown and historic neighborhoods ====
The centro histórico of Campeche is an example of a fortified urban center in the viceregal baroque style. It contains many examples of Spanish Colonial architecture, and the fortifications system of Campeche is an important example of Spanish military architecture of the 17th and 18th centuries. These qualities have earned it the designation of Cultural Heritage of Humanity by the United Nations Educational, Scientific and Cultural Organization.

Its aligned streets provide an opportunity to observe the decoration of its houses, some of them with strong Moorish and Spanish influences of the 18th century and some modifications of the 19th century. The colors of its facades add visual character, and the streets reflect the area’s history and traditions.

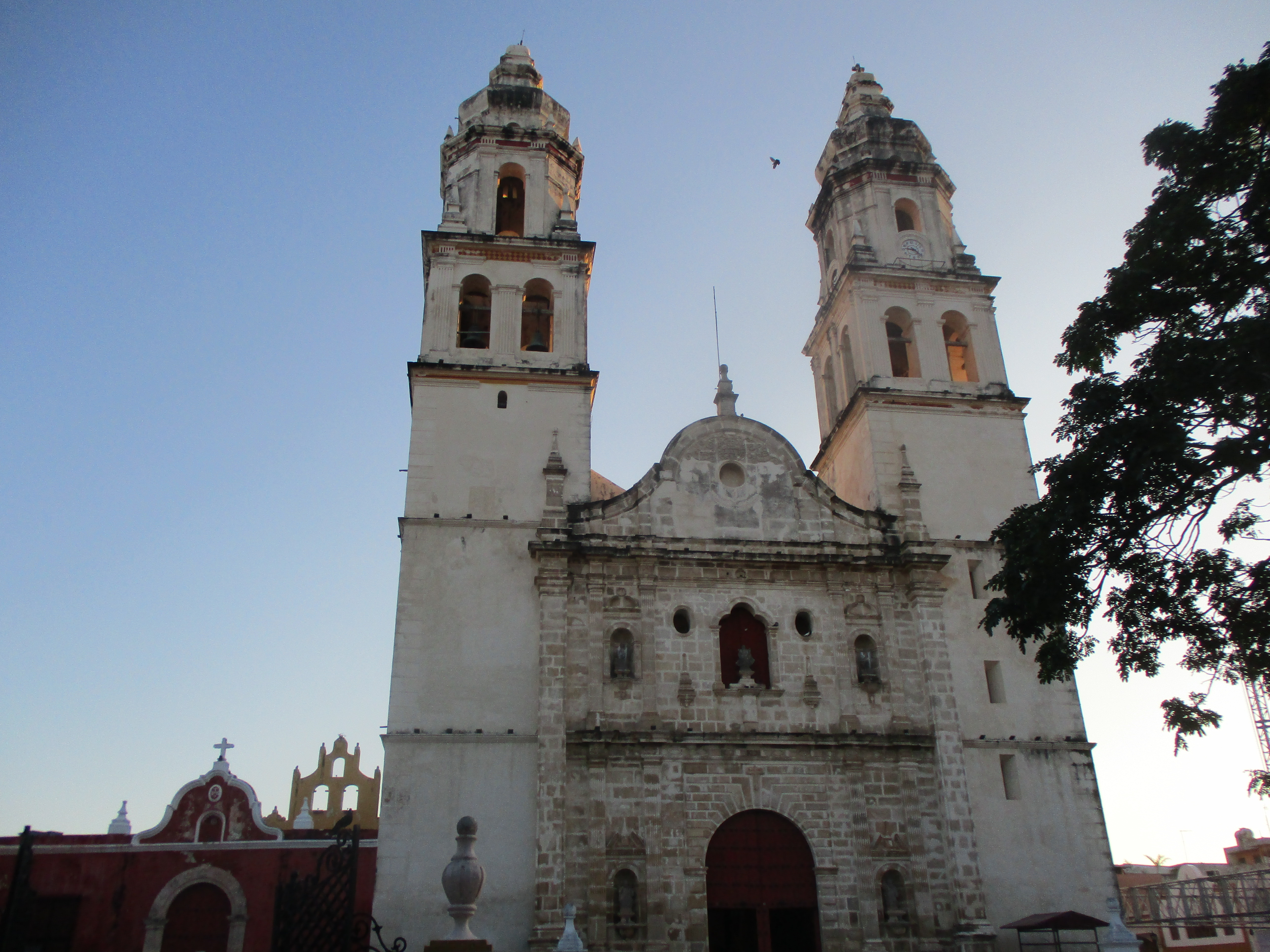
San Francisco de Campeche Cathedral.

The walls around part of the city are a reminder of the viceroyalty of the 17th and 18th centuries.

Religious and civil architecture are merged with civil and military architecture, as modest bastions of faith that protected the population during pirate offensives; Franciscan bulrush churches and baroque altarpieces with Solomon columns leave a mark of their strong impact during Catholic evangelization in fortified American lands such as the Villa de San Francisco de Campeche. The sobriety of its facades are imposed on the faith when the protection of its faithful was pondering.

==== Archaeological sites ====
There is the place known as Acanmul and also relatively close, the archaeological sites of Edzná and Jaina. The city can also be taken as a starting point to visit other important sites of the State of Campeche.

===== Edzná =====
The "Casa de los Itzáes", is a place where we find about twenty monumental buildings that tell us about the concentration of political, economic and religious power that occurred in pre-Columbian times.

Due to the type of soil, the valley in which it is located, is flooded in the rainy season and retains high humidity almost all year. To remedy this problem, the Maya developed an advanced system of hydraulic works: a network of canals drained the valley and the water was taken to a lagoon, which was transformed into dam through retaining walls, while other canals were used to irrigate the fields. This led to an optimum degree of moisture in the soil for intensive cultivation while the canals provided abundant fishing, and were used as communication routes and in some cases served as a defense. The plazas had a magnificent drain system and the rainwater reached artificial reservoirs called chultunes.

Edzná had numerous religious, administrative and residential buildings distributed over an area of approximately 25 square kilometers. Of particular importance on this site is the five-story building, which is built on a large platform that gives it great architectural majesty.

===== Jaina =====
The "House on the sea" is one of the most interesting places in the region due mainly to its fame as a Mayan necropolis. A little more than a thousand human burials have been explored around the site, in which extraordinary pieces of clay have been found that were possibly deposited as mortuary offerings. At the time of their discovery, these pieces helped cultivate a new appreciation of the art Mayan Culture made in mud, since its quality far exceeded what had previously been found in the area.

==== The Petenes ====
Part of the urban area of San Francisco de Campeche borders the Los Petenes Biosphere Reserve.

Curious circular forms of vegetation have been called petenes where the origin of a source of fresh water, in the middle of an area of salt water, promotes the development of plants less resistant to salt, leading to islets where flora has taken hierarchy around the origin of fresh water. It is an entire organization that allows nesting and refuge for a large number of bird and mammal species.

In the coastal mangroves of the reserve, there are innumerable natural paths that make up routes, in them the sport of fishing tarpon and the observation of birds and other animal species are carried out.

The natural wealth of the area forms a scenario for the development and enjoyment of various activities of ecotourism.

== Transportation ==
The city is served by the Tren Maya at San Francisco de Campeche railway station and with commercial airline flights at Campeche International Airport. The Campeche Light Train is a guided bus line that connects the historic center of the city with the airport and train station.

== Culture ==
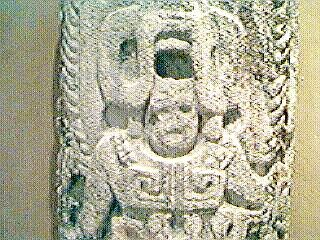
Maya stele at the Soledad Museum.

=== The typical dress ===
Essentially composed of three pieces, the upper part has its origin in the huipil or mestizo hipil, it differs in that it is embroidered in black and with motifs inspired by the flowers of onion and pumpkin. The suit complements an overflow of Santa Maria; The skirt is of Spanish origin and reaches the ankles is made of calico or zaraza, fine printed taffeta or Spanish brocade.

=== Music and dances ===
Campechanos like music in all its forms, from romantic serenades to cheerful dances.

- 'Los pregones.' Estampas costumbristas, which represent, in a very special way, several typical Campeche characters, offering merchandise that they sell in different neighborhoods and streets.
- 'Las chancletitas.' The agile chacleteo.
- 'The shaking.' He is the forerunner of the Loving Pichito and other zarandangas, written in 2/4 compass of live and martial movement. Keep kinship with sounds of Mayan influence.
- 'The cutz.' It is a turkey of beautiful plumage. According to legend, when the birds of these rainforests did their parties and danced, there was no mount turkey, which was dispossessed by nature, of its feathers. Until he was discovered by the pheasant, who invited him to the celebration, and to wrap him up, each of the attendees gave him a feather of his kind. Thus he acquired his splendid plumage. But looking so beautiful, he did not want to lose his wardrobe and fled. The pujuy, (cover roads) looks for him, stopping the flight of all the birds and in his song he says: give me back my suit, gentleman! The dancers symbolize the feathers with a ribbon of color that each one brings, and on the neck of the dancer representing the cutz, they turn them on.
- 'Jarana 6x8.' Emerging with a history of the "first dairy", it is currently in the public domain; This version does not have more than forty years of dancing in Campeche. They combine their cheerful rhythm with a "'Guapacheo".
- 'El Gallo.' It is an indigenous dance characteristic of the town of Lerma. It is danced on May 3, at the feast of the Holy Cross. Its purpose is to attract fertility in the fields, so they sacrifice a rooster that during the dance takes it hanging on the back, the only man who participates in it. The women are holding a jícara with corn seeds that sound like the movement of the dance steps. It is customary to wear a hat on which they place a paliacate.
- 'Son del turkey.' (Seguidilla) is a short-lived zapateado, but very energetic and vivacious. It became widespread in the mid-19th century. They dance in pairs, caught by one arm of the waist, while the other is free and raised. The dance is characterized by its agility and joy.
- 'La Guaranducha.' Jarana 6x8 and Habanera. You can start can jarana, but with the special mode of the tropics in the guapacheos and zapateados. Halfway through the dance, the Havana rhythm corresponding to the black influence troupe is introduced; At this time, the couples of ease come off to dance, while they chant and mark the rhythm with claps. In the end, everyone joins the dance, ending with the jarana.
- 'Creole syrup.' The rattling of three churches of the port of Campeche calling for worship inspired the composition of this syrup. This syrup is one of the oldest that has news in Mexico.
- 'Pichito amoroso.' It belongs to the big genus and is a Zarabanda with which the "Santaneros" began. It is one of the most cheerful tropical rhythm dances with the youthful bullanguera of Campeche. Can the arms imitates the flight of this bird that belongs to the group of thrush, so its jumps and jumps give rise to complicated figures and accompanied and beautiful auctions.
- 'La Jerengoza.' Dance typical of the region that coincides with Las Randeñas, known tonadilla in the neighborhood of Santa Ana; their music is lively and strident and the dancers, with redoubled step, take wheel positions and turn making changes towards the center and outwards, or on themselves, to finish with a very colorful finish.
- 'The cockroach.' Dance known as "are of trouble", its execution requires ease and grace, since its rhythm coincides with those of "choteo", "correteo" and "bailoteo", when interpreting it, the man puts his hands on the woman's shoulders, leaning a little towards her, thus imitating the cockroach shell.
- 'Campechito retrechero.' Jarana that is danced to the rhythm of six by eight; of agile zapateado, where the dancers show their grace and dexterity and, as proof of this, either in the bushel or on the table, a bottle is placed on the head, and some of them, trays with glasses and bottles, same, that despite the zapateado, when performing the dance, they remain keeping a balance that causes admiration.
- 'The flower of the malagueña.' This number belongs to the great survival sounds in Campeche, its genre is dotted Malagueña. It is considered as one of the oldest. It is singled out by the cadence with solos that led to unusual dance poses, with very airy and light movements. Its structure is markedly Spanish.
- 'Creole syrup.' His dance dates back to the end of the 18th century and is also a strong number, has diverse choreographies and some quite complicated, but the theme is in the reproduction that the dancers do together with the Charanga, of the so-called bells of the Cathedral, its end is large and studied.
- 'Campechanita Habanera.' This dance is a classic Havana or Cuban chain. It goes back to the year of 1861 and was danced in all the salons of the time; The dance opens with the salt shaker that characterizes the campechanos and concludes with a zapateado to finish off.
- 'Syrup Gatuno.' Piece considered to be large classic, is a cat; its importance is that only in Campeche survives in its three versions, because it was condemned to disappear for not agreeing to the customs of its time.
- 'The Fandango.' They are large classic, based in Campeche, since the 18th century, and is still in some regions. Because of its idea of disorder and hustle and bustle, it is interpreted in very lively and cheerful ways without making a couple or defining with whom you dance, all dance and zap in confusion, marking and challenging with heel strokes who is closest indifferent to the opposite sex. It retains the Spanish style very marked, it is written in three-beat measure and there is no news of its copla.
- 'Cuban Arabic.' This is a short but very energetic dance, it is written in six eighths and its genre is zapateado. It is danced linked by the waist and with the free hand up, it is always done in the game of two couples or in even numbers that evolve, heel and valsean with very fast turns and running almost the entire stage, it is repeated several times, it concludes with a strong blow and displace the public, asking for applause.
- 'Campechito retrechero.' It is the diminutive affectionate together with the traditional expression that means the contagious joy and the carefree limitlessness of the Campeche spirit, given name to this typical jarana. The dancers embellish themselves with their heels and infect the spectator, with the bullanguera chant of an ancient town that has managed to project a personality across seas and continents.
- 'Baile del Almud.' Set of mestizo sounds that naturalized in Yucatán and Campeche, acquired the name of jarana; The skillful heel and shot at 6x8 pace make it very lucid. When running on a bushel, its beauty becomes more significant, when the music is interrupted, the dancers continue to zap, taking turns in this fate, and demonstrating their ability.

=== Gastronomy ===
The “Cruise Poet" Yucatecan wrote,

"Two things have Campeche that cause admiration: His pickled branch ... And his rich Cazón Bread."

Among its dishes is the seafood cocktail, pickled fish, and Cazón bread. Other dishes include the Sierra Frita, the Pámpano in Verde, as well as appetizers from region such as panuchos and tamales coladas, among others.

- Pan de cazón: a stacked, casserole dish consisting of tortillas, beans and dogfish with a tomato-based habanero sauce.
- Cazón empanadas
- Aguas frescas: (horchata, Jamaica, black tea)
- Coconut shrimp
- Green branch

=== Fairs and cultural events ===
- Bread Fair: In the month of March
- Carnival: it is celebrated in the month of February without a definite date, for more than 450 years. The oldest carnival in the country begins with the funeral walk and the burning of bad mood, represented by a rag doll.
- San Román Fair: from September 14 to 30. It begins with the descent of the Black Christ from the Church of the homonymous neighborhood.
- San Francisco Fair: held from October 4 to 19.
- International Cervantino Festival.
- Cultural Festival of the historic center: it takes place in December
- Expoindustrial

== Media ==
=== Press ===
- Tribuna de Campeche
- Novedades de Campeche
- Crónica de Campeche
- El Sur de Campeche
- El Expreso de Campeche
- Campeche Hoy
- La N de Campeche
- Semanario Horizonte
- La Opinión
- Por Esto!

=== Television ===
- XHCAM-TDT ...24 ( 7.1 HD ) - Azteca 7
  - 24 (7.2 SD) - a+
- XHCTCA-TDT 20 ( 3.1 HD ) - Imagen Televisión
  - 20 (3.4 SD) - Excélsior TV
- XHAN-TDT 22 (5.1 HD) - Canal 5
  - 22 (9.1 SD) - NU9VE (Televisa Campeche)
- XHTMCA-TDT 27 (13.1) Telsusa Television
- XHGE-TDT 29 ( 1.1 HD ) - Azteca 13
  - 29 ( 1.2 SD ) - ADN 40
- XHCCA-TDT 30 (4.1 HD) - Televisión y Radio de Campeche
- XHOPCC-TDT 32 (14.1 HD) - Canal Catorce
  - 32 (11.1 SD) - Canal Once
  - 32 (22.1 SD) - Canal 22
  - 32 (14.2 SD) - Ingenio Tv
  - 32 (20.1 SD) - TV UNAM
  - 32 (45.1 SD) - Canal del Congreso
- XHCPA-TDT 34 (2.1 HD) - Las Estrellas

Pay TV

- Telemar
- Telesur
- Mayavisión
- TVM

== City fortifications ==
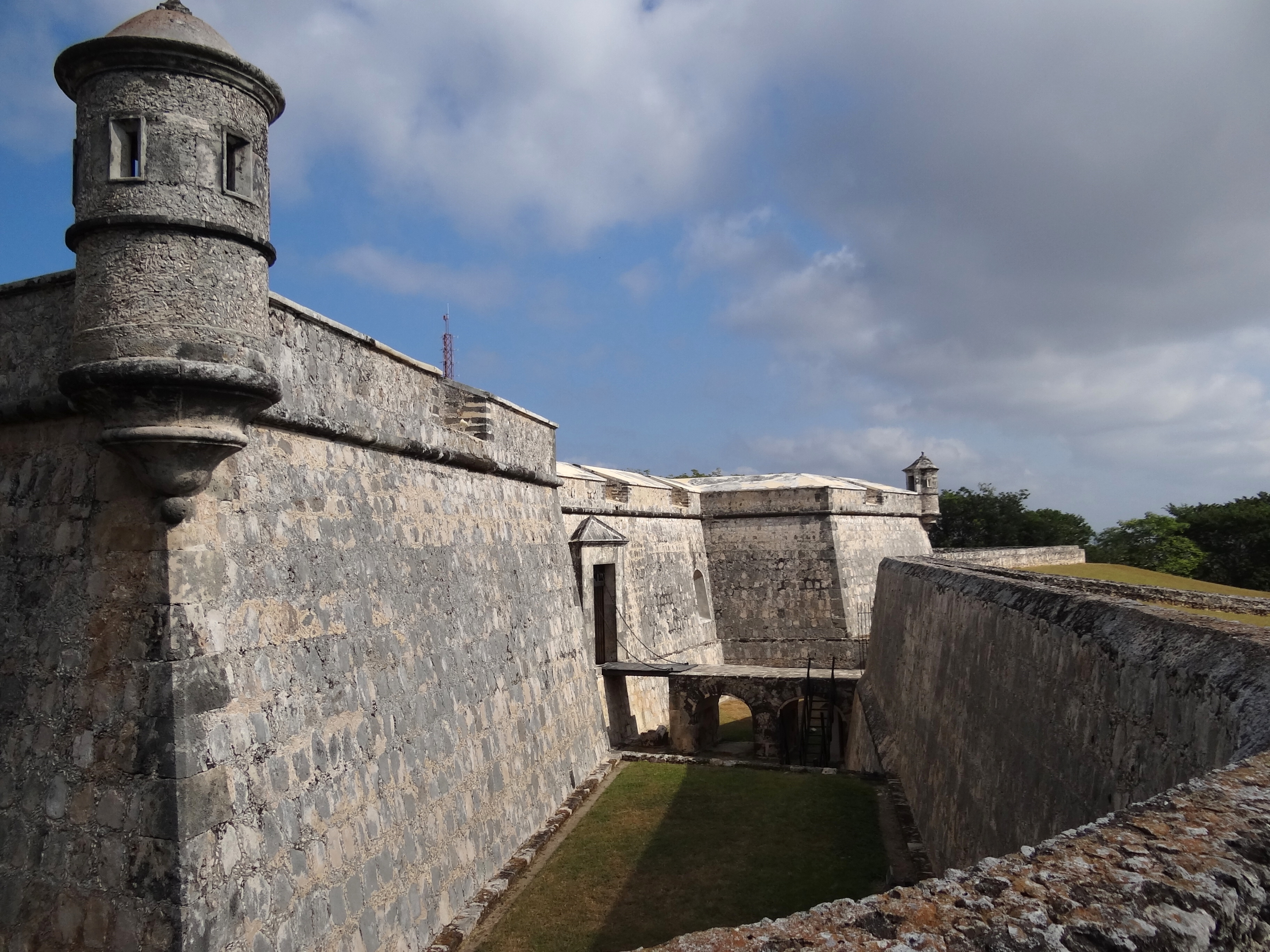

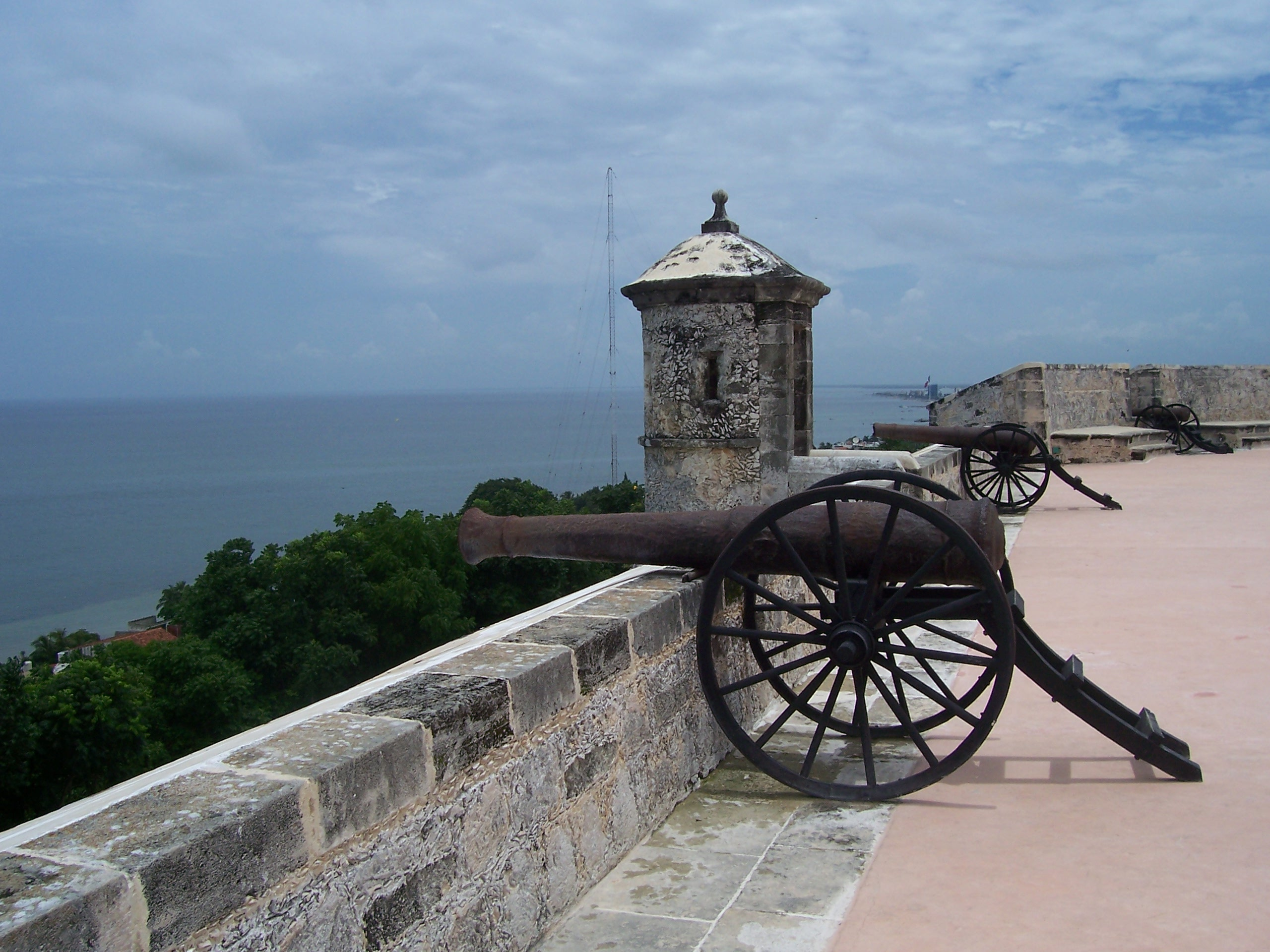
The Fort of San Miguel was built to defend the town against the attack of pirates during the 17th and 18th centuries.

The city of Campeche is an example of urbanism in a baroque colonial city, with a reticular and regular plan, its urban trace, a model of colonial port cities, reflects the main role that it played as a commercial, religious and military connection point characterized by its high level of integrity and homogeneity. More than one thousand buildings with a historic value have survived as witnesses of space and temporal superimposition of several significant historic periods of Mexico.

Campeche faced regular attacks by Dutch, English and French buccaneers and pirates such as Francis Drake, John Hawkins, Laurens de Graaf, Cornelis Jol, Jacobo Jackson, Jean Lafitte, Francisco de Grammont, Bartolomé Portugués, William Parker, Francisco Nau, Edward Mansvelt, Henry Morgan, Lewis Scot, Roche Braziliano and Michel de Grammont for almost 160 years. In response, in 1686 the government started to fortify the city.

The French engineer Louis Bouchard de Becour was commissioned to unify all the defensive works that surrounded the city with a wall. At its completion, the wall surrounding the city of Campeche was 2,560 meters in length, forming an irregular hexagon around the main part of the city, with eight defensive bastions on the corners. These bulwarks now serve different functions:

- Santiago: Used as the Botanical Garden 'Xmuch´haltún'. Reconstructed.
- San Pedro: Former prison.
- San Francisco: Protects the Land Gate. Houses the library of the INAH.
- San Juan: Protects the Land Gate.
- Nuestra Señora de la Soledad: Also protects the Sea Gate. It is the largest one and holds the Museum of City History.
- San Carlos: Holds the City Museum. This fort was the first one built. Protects the Sea Gate.
- Santa Rosa.

It also contained four gates to allow access to the main quarters. The main entrances are the Puerta de la tierra ("Land Gate"), built in 1732, and the Puerta del mar ("Sea Gate"). The Land Gate is kept as a tourist attraction, having a light and sound show three nights each week and keeping original supplies and items from the 17th century. The other gates were Guadalupe and San Román, connecting to the outside neighborhoods.

Additionally, two main forts protected the city from two nearby hills on each side, the forts of San José el Alto (built in 1762) and San Miguel. These forts gave long-range artillery coverage and served also as look-outs. They were built before the walls of the city. The fort of San Miguel is used as a museum and houses a collection of pre-Hispanic items. The fort of San José houses a collection of boats and weapons of the period.

=== Museum of Maya Architecture Baluarte de la Soledad ===
The Museum of Maya Architecture Baluarte de la Soledad is a former military bastion located in San Francisco de Campeche, Mexico. Built as one of the eight fortifications protecting the colonial city, it has undergone various transformations over time.

Recognized as a historical monument in 1937, it became a museum in 1958, initially housing colonial and Maya collections. After several reorganizations, it specialized in Maya architecture and now exhibits monoliths, stelae, and architectural elements from sites such as Calakmul, Edzná, and Río Bec.

The building, with an irregular pentagonal shape, consists of two levels. The ground floor houses exhibition and restoration rooms, while the upper floor is surrounded by original military structures.

==== Gallery ====
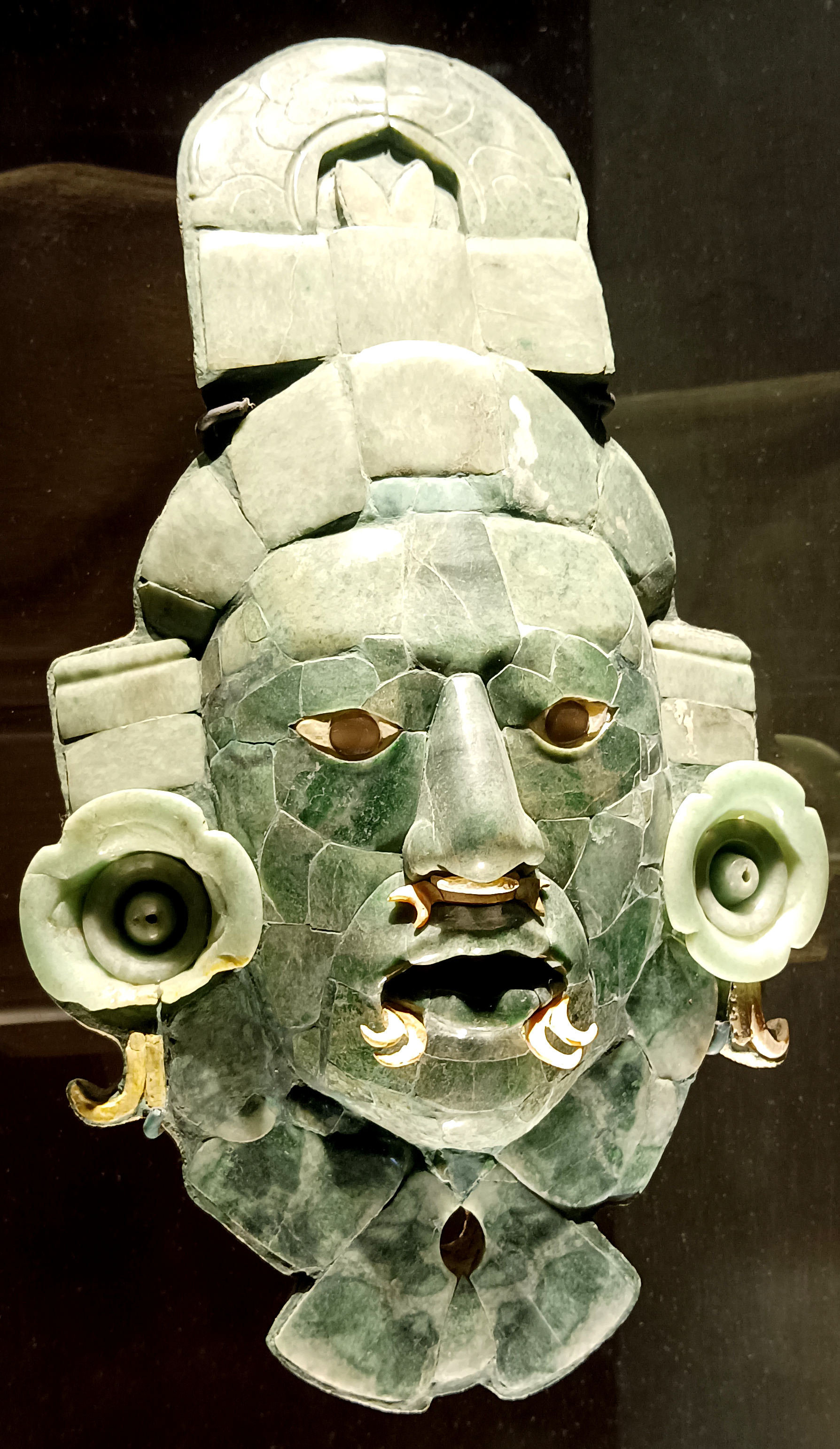
Jade mask from Calakmul

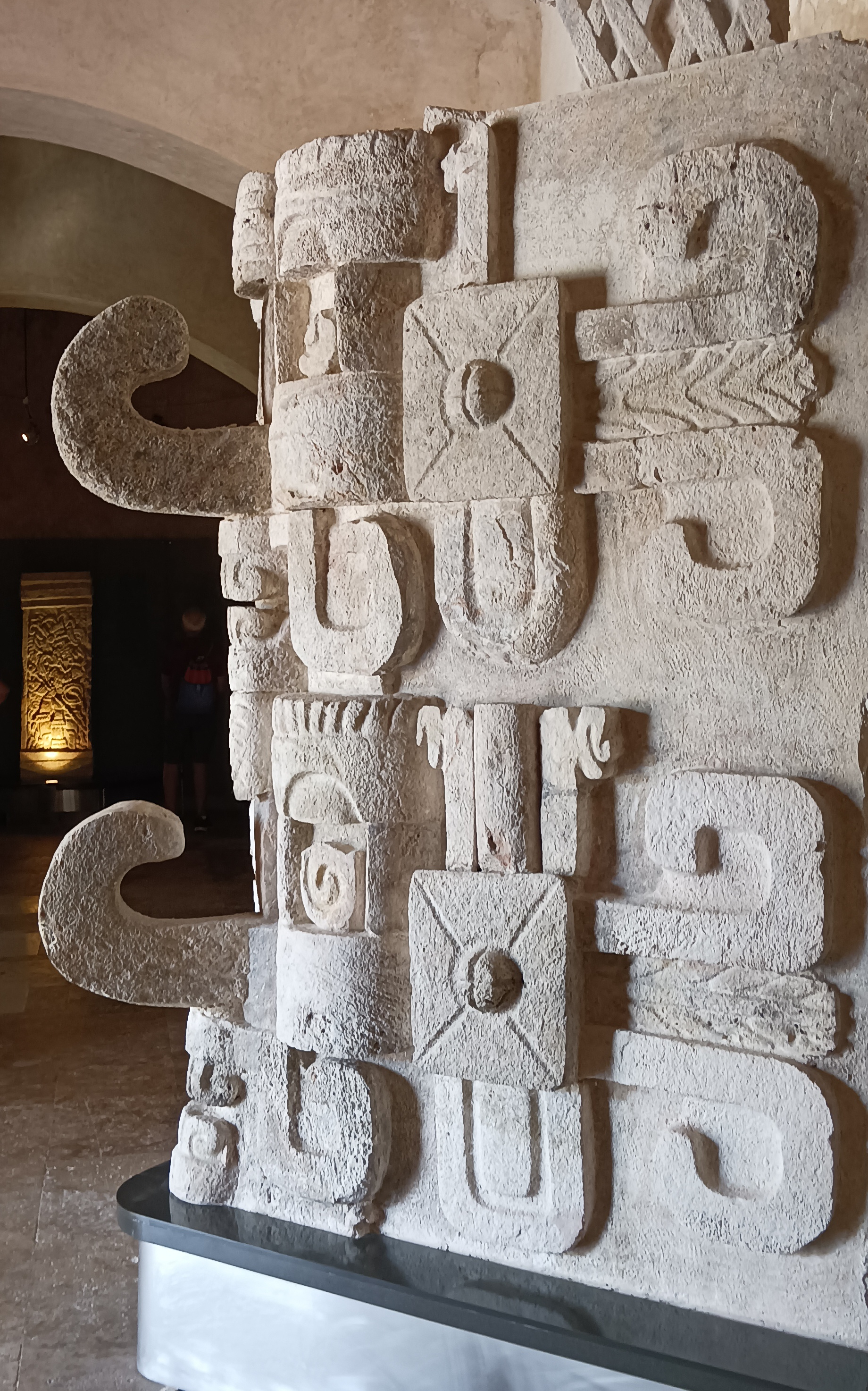
Masks of the god Chaac, Puuc style

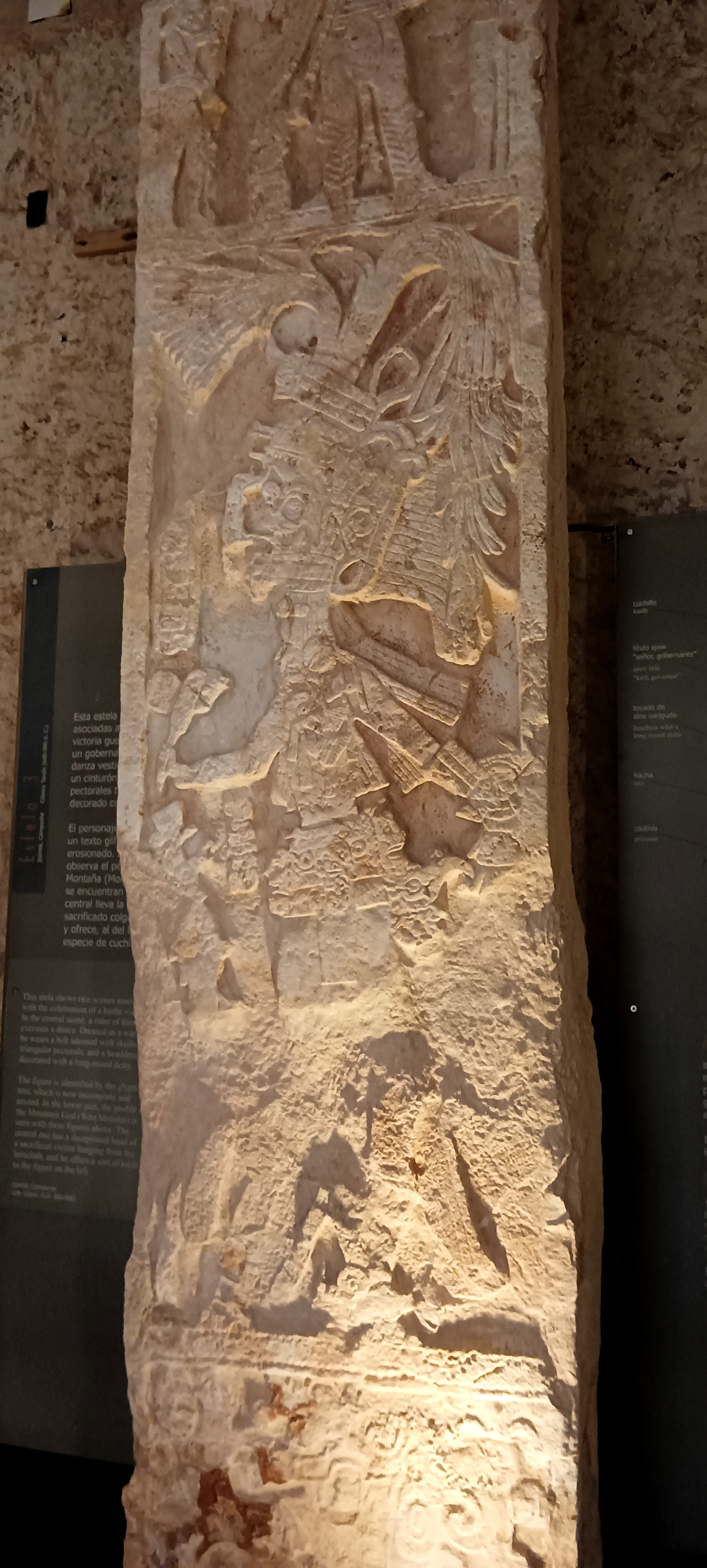
Stela 3 from Itzimté, Campeche

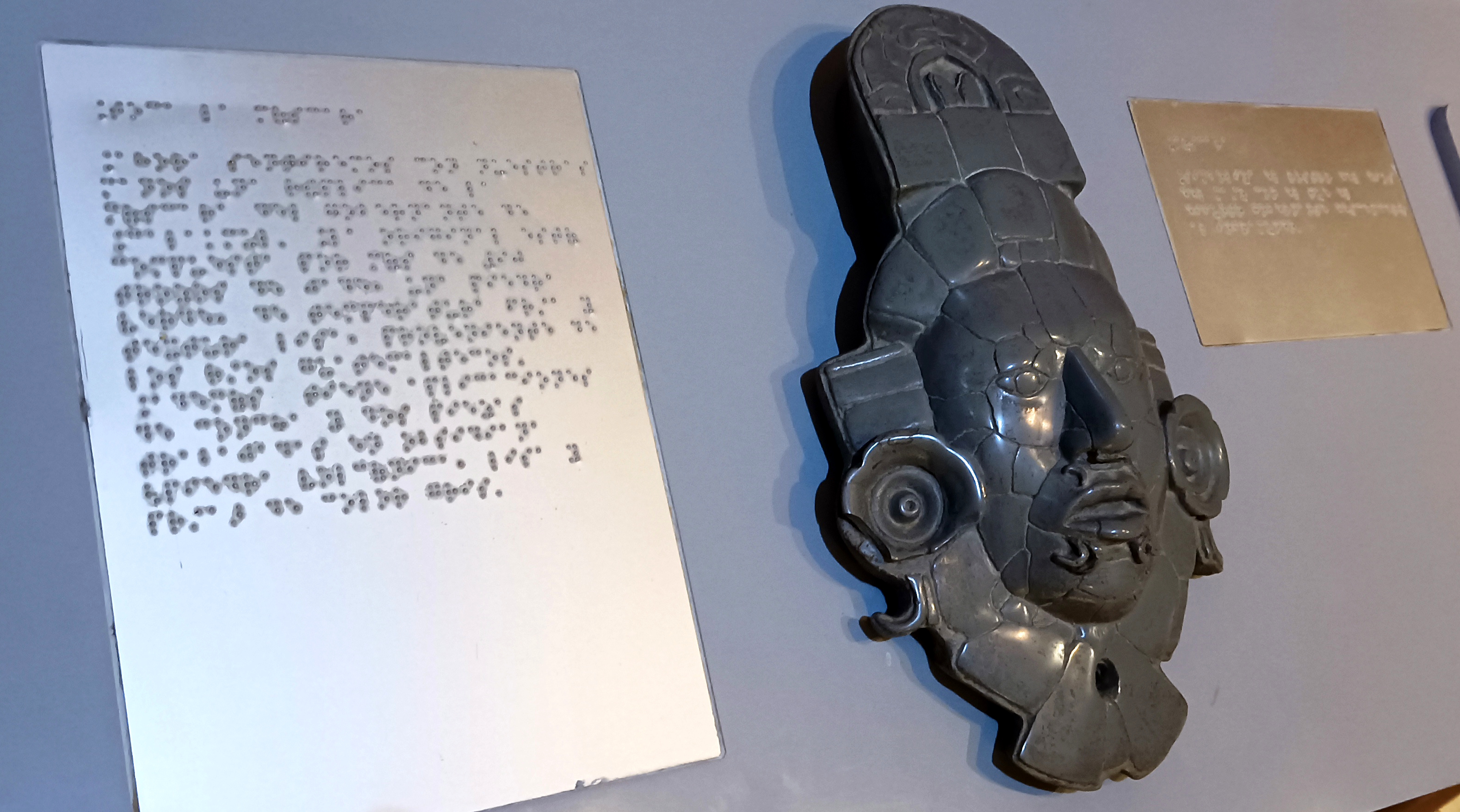
Tactile panel about the Calakmul mask

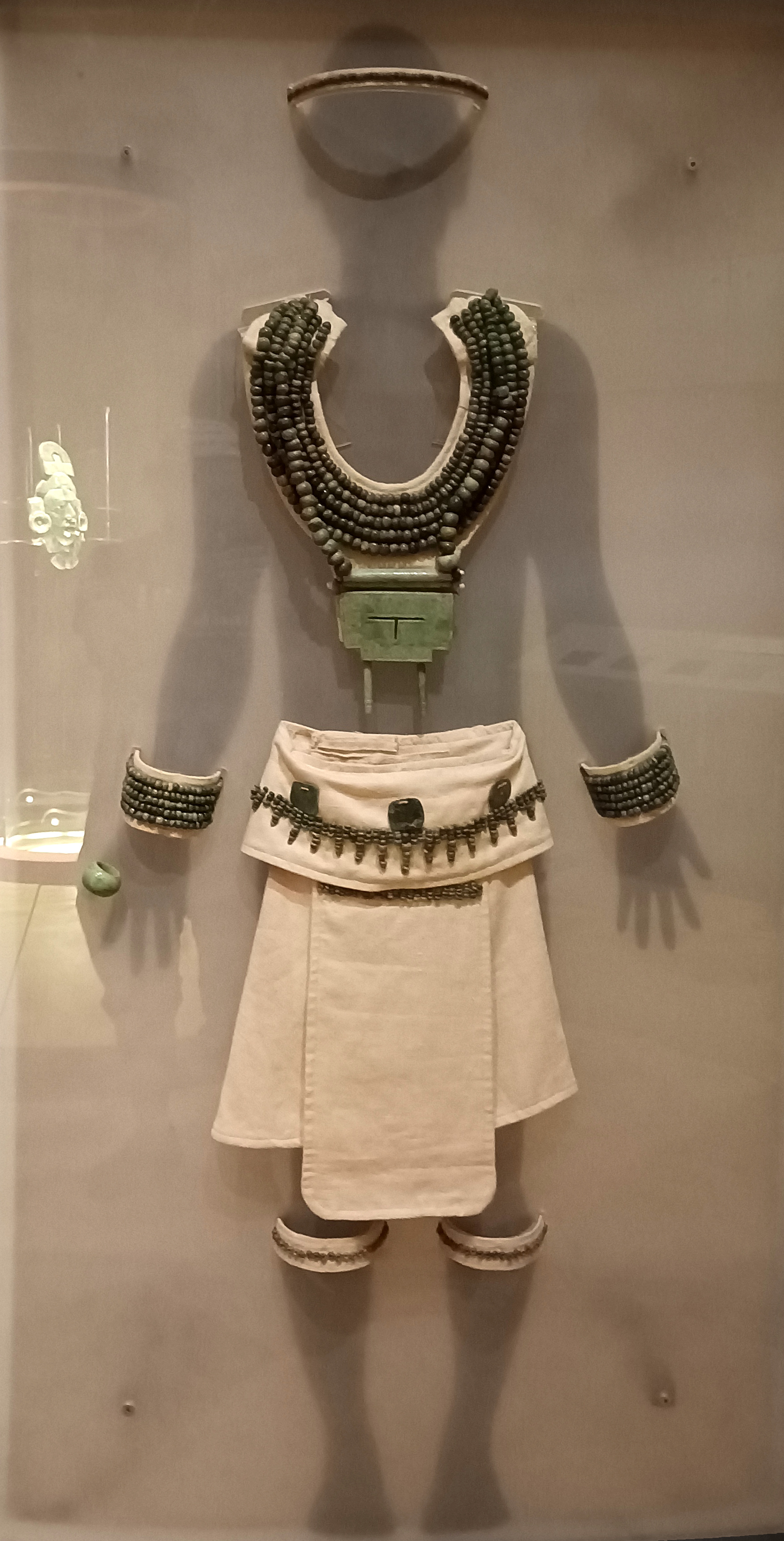
Funerary treasure from Calakmul

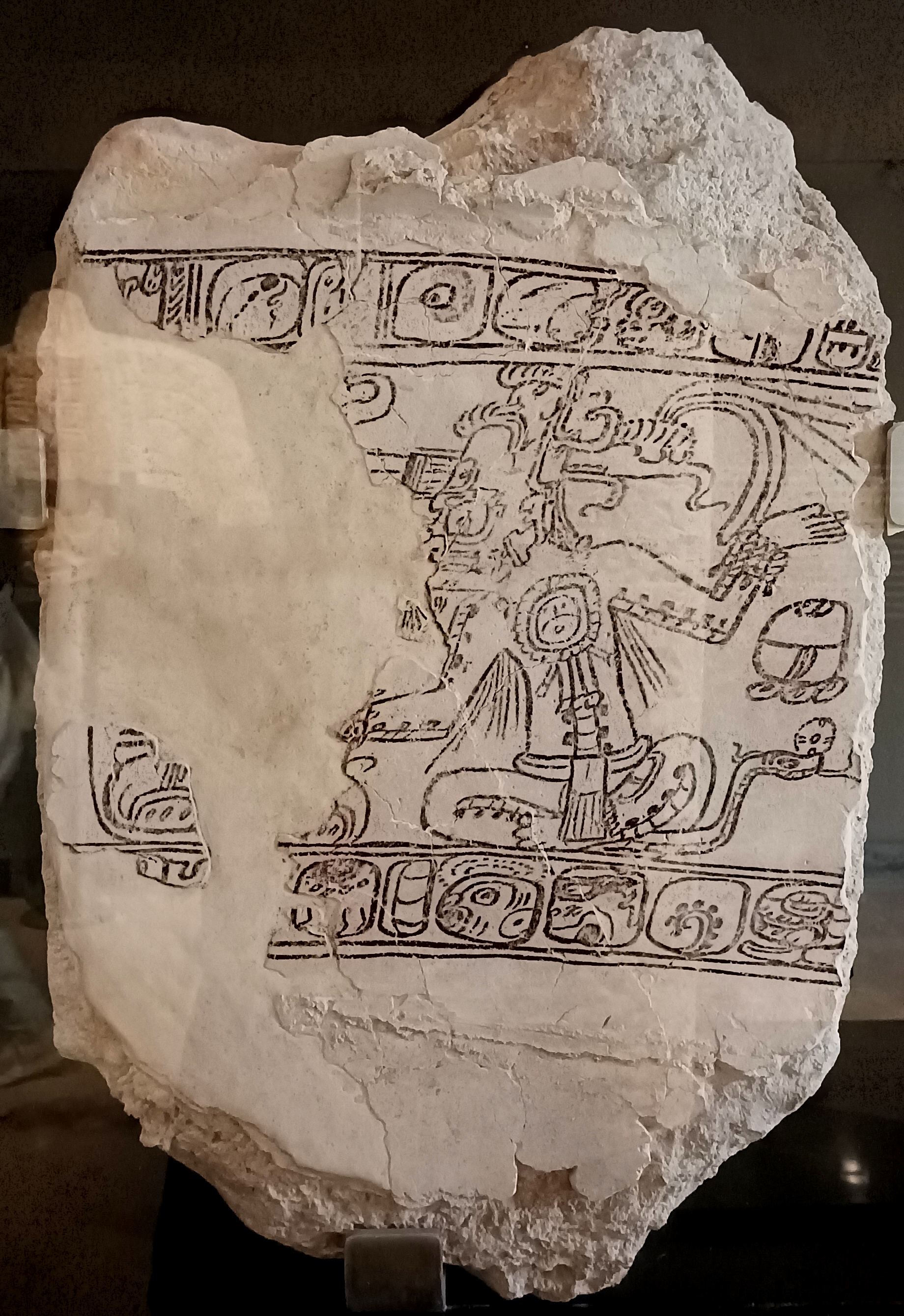
Vault keystone with the god K'awiil

== Twin towns – sister cities ==
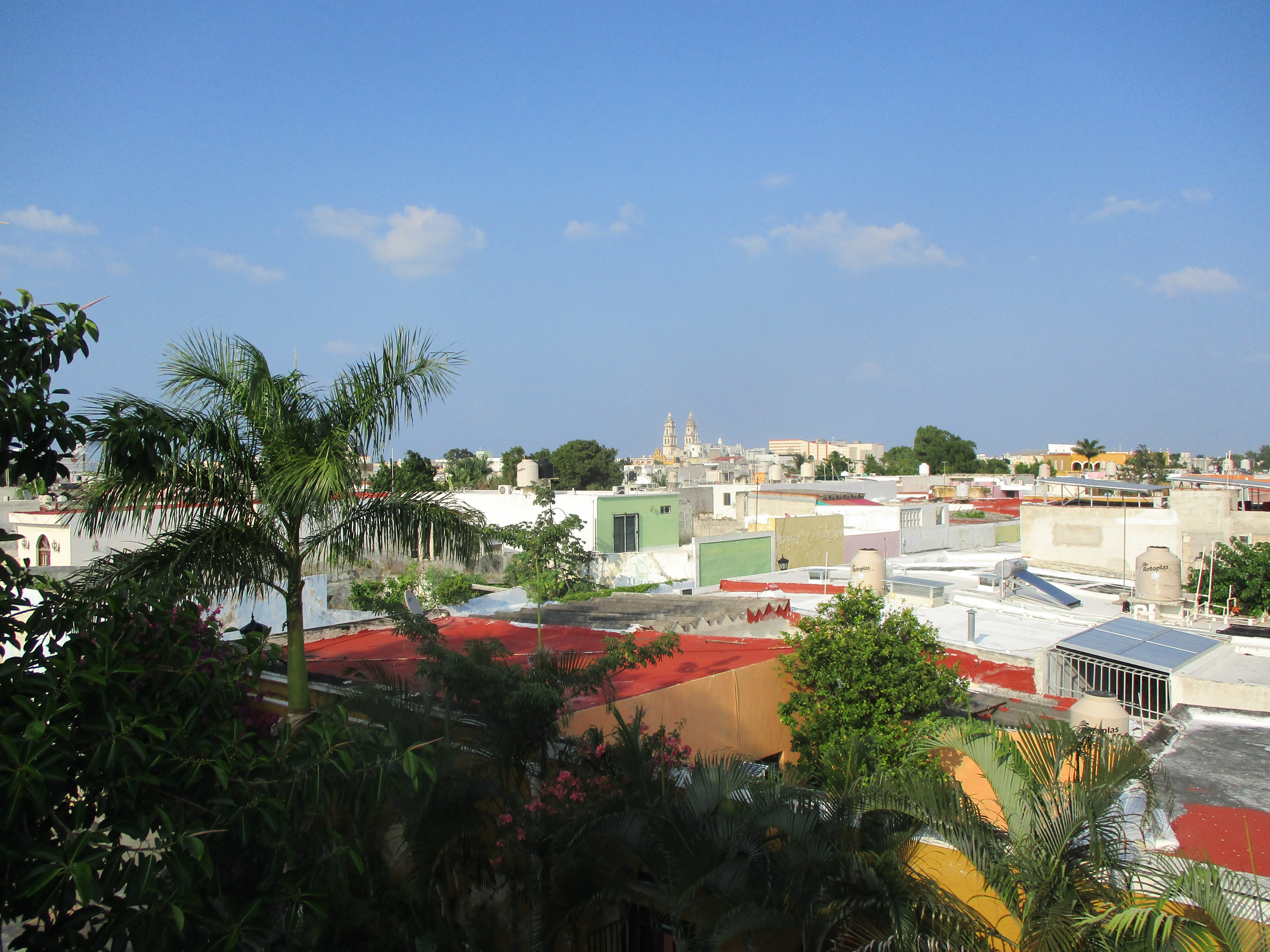
View of San Francisco de Campeche

Campeche is twinned with:

- Cartagena, Colombia
- Halifax, Canada
- Ibiza, Spain
- Laredo, United States
- Matanzas, Cuba
- Quetzaltenango, Guatemala
- Volusia County, United States

== Gallery ==
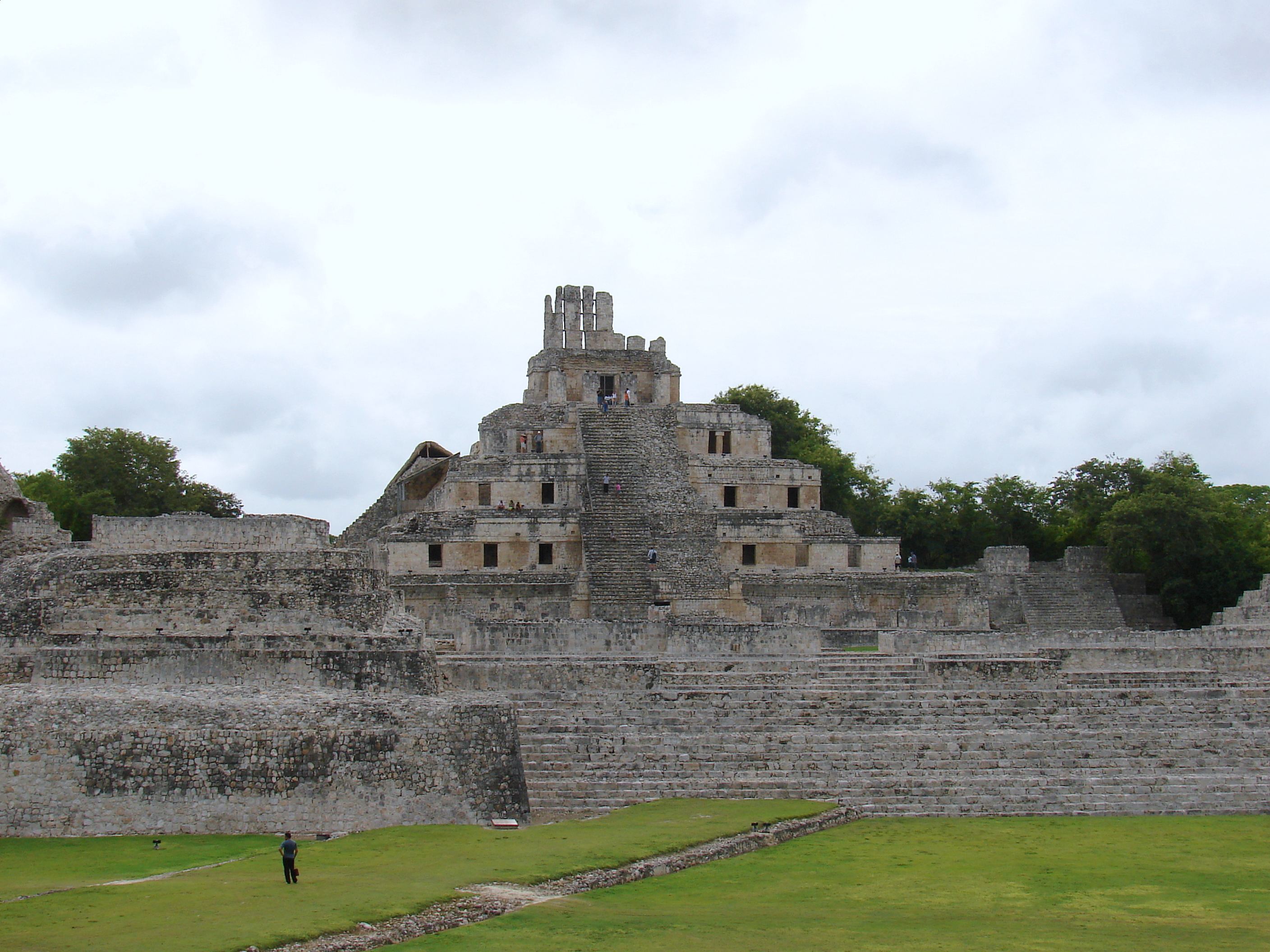
Archaeological zone of Edzná.

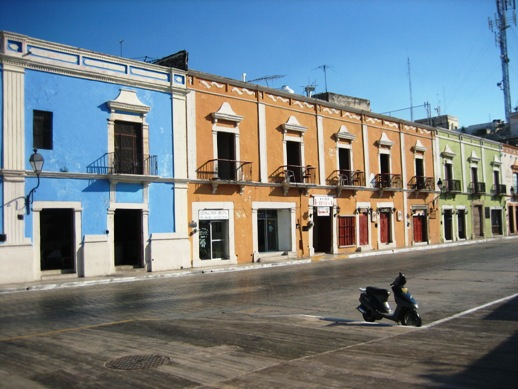
Colonial Spanish houses in Campeche.

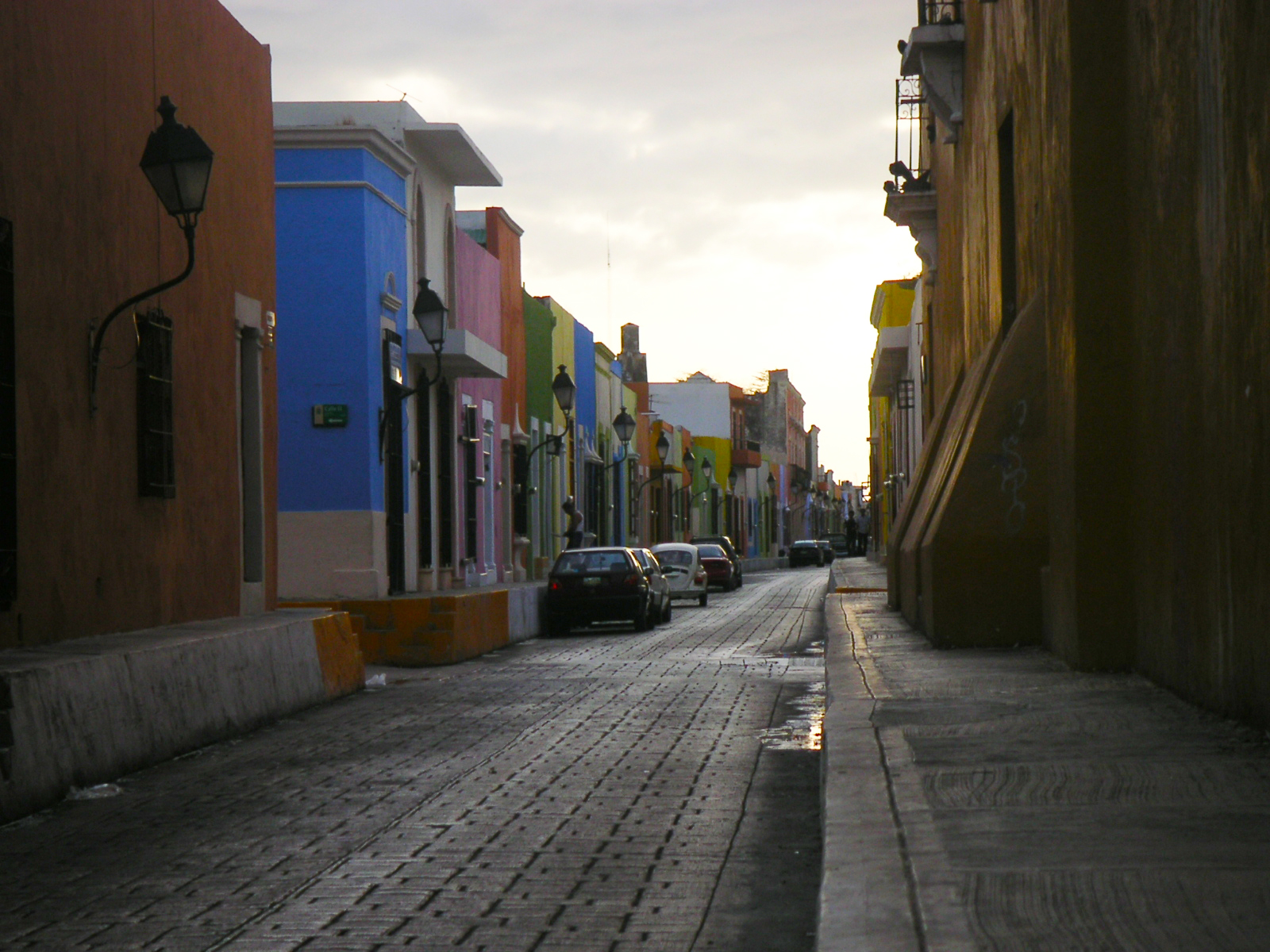
Buildings along a street in central Campeche with typical colors.

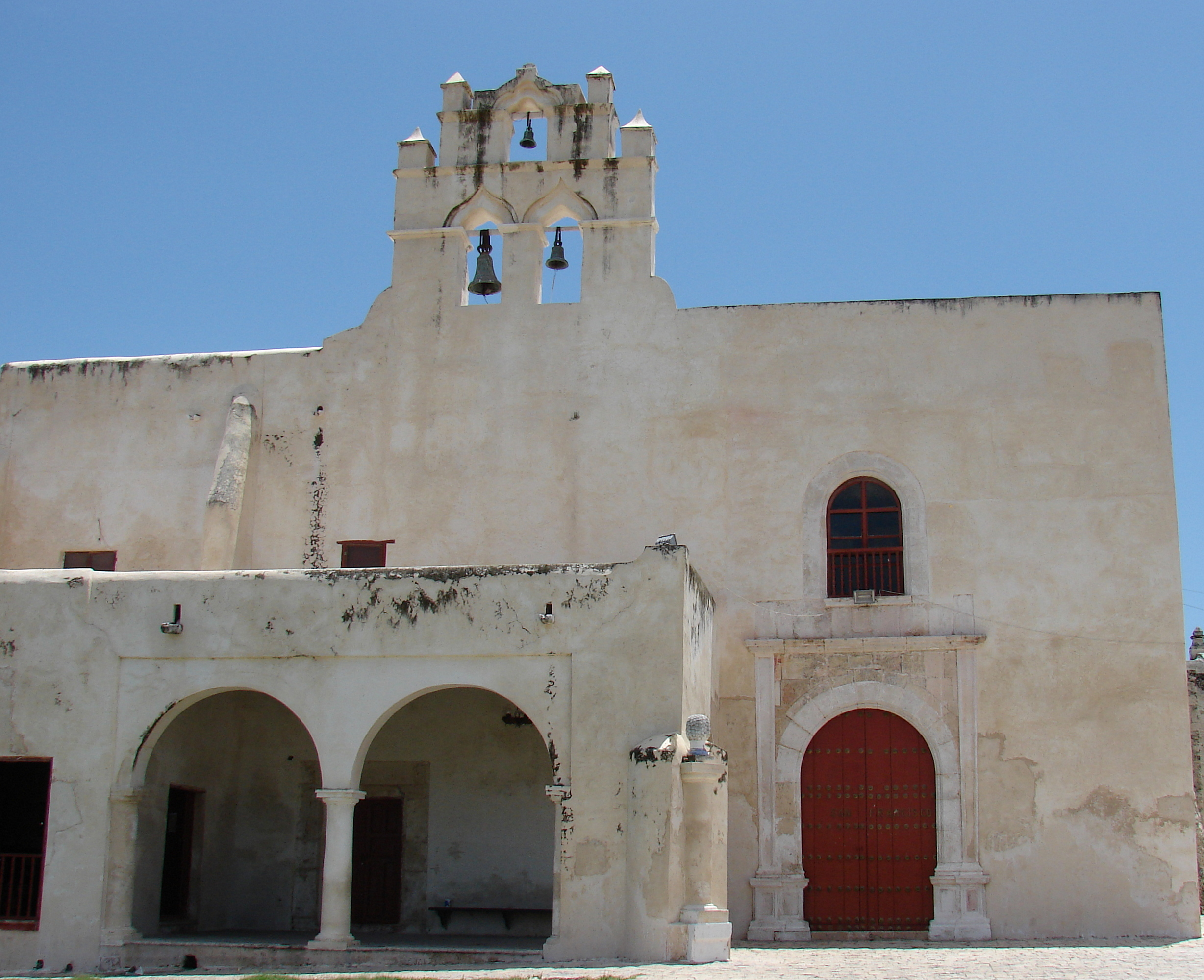
The church and convent of San Francisco, 1540, one of the oldest in the Americas, was built on the site where officiate the first church on the mainland in 1517.

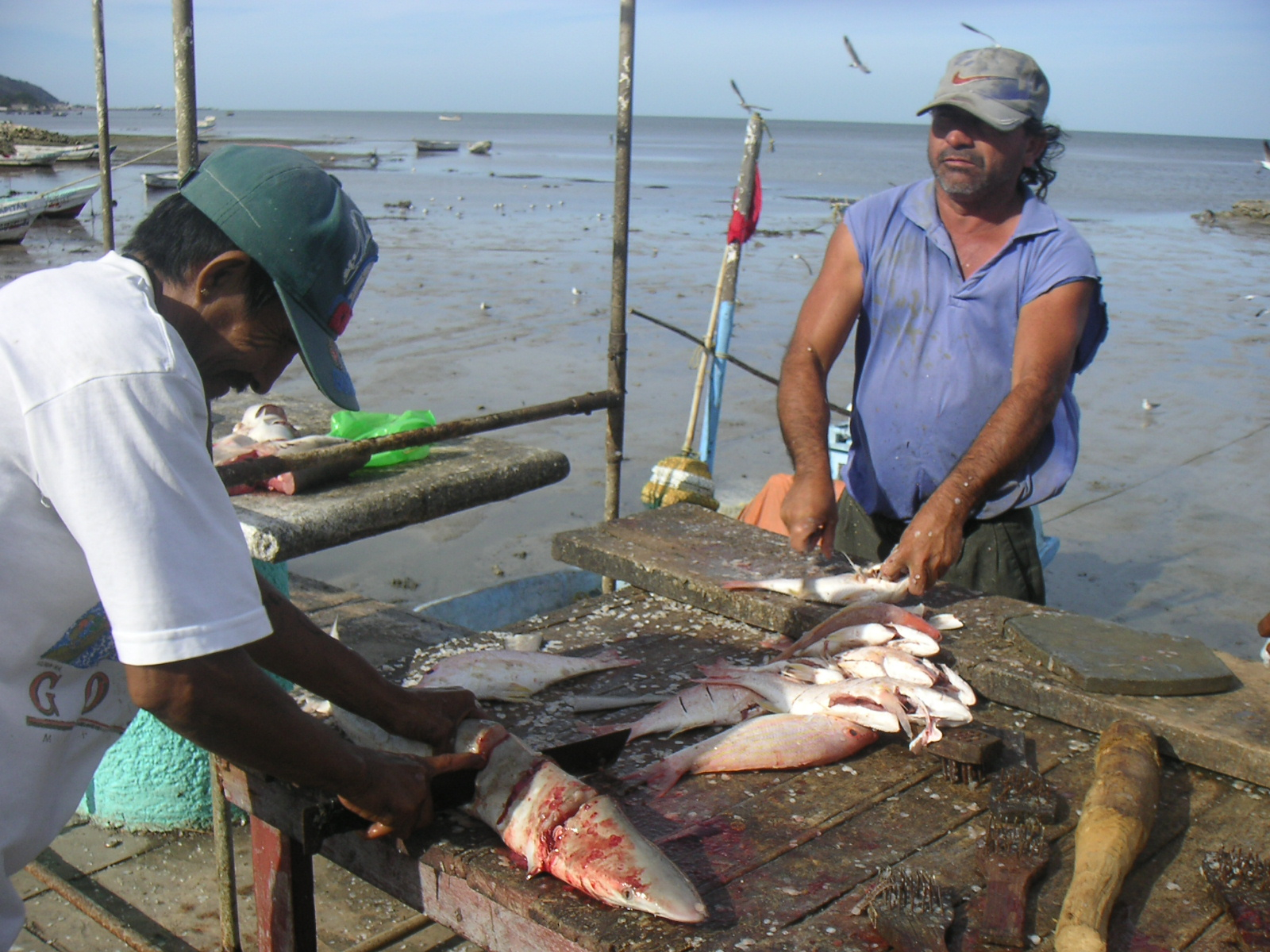
Campeche fishermen cutting up the catch on the Gulf of Mexico.

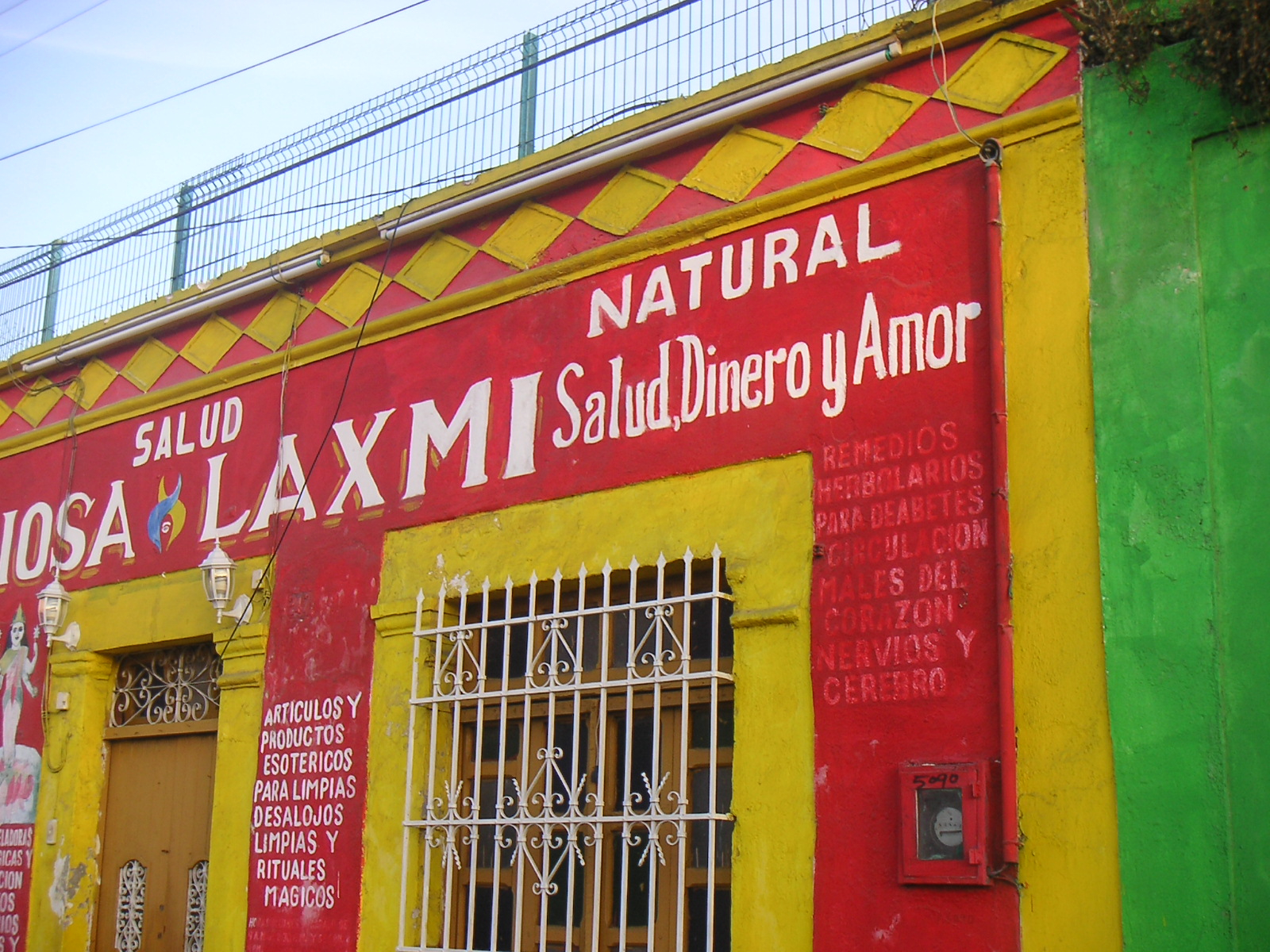
Shop in central Campeche selling magical adjuncts and elixirs.

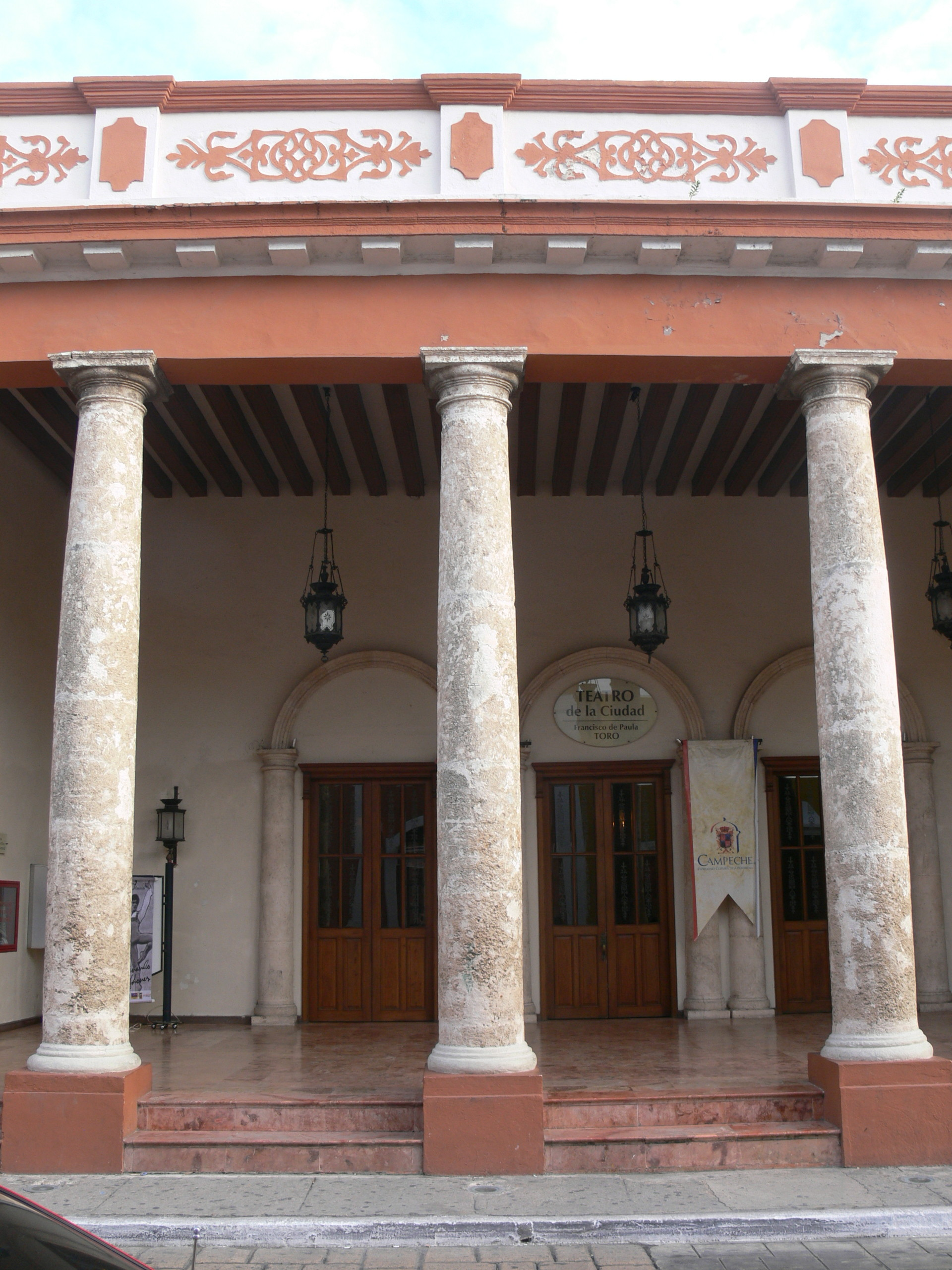
Francisco de Paula Toro Theatre, (1832 - 1834).

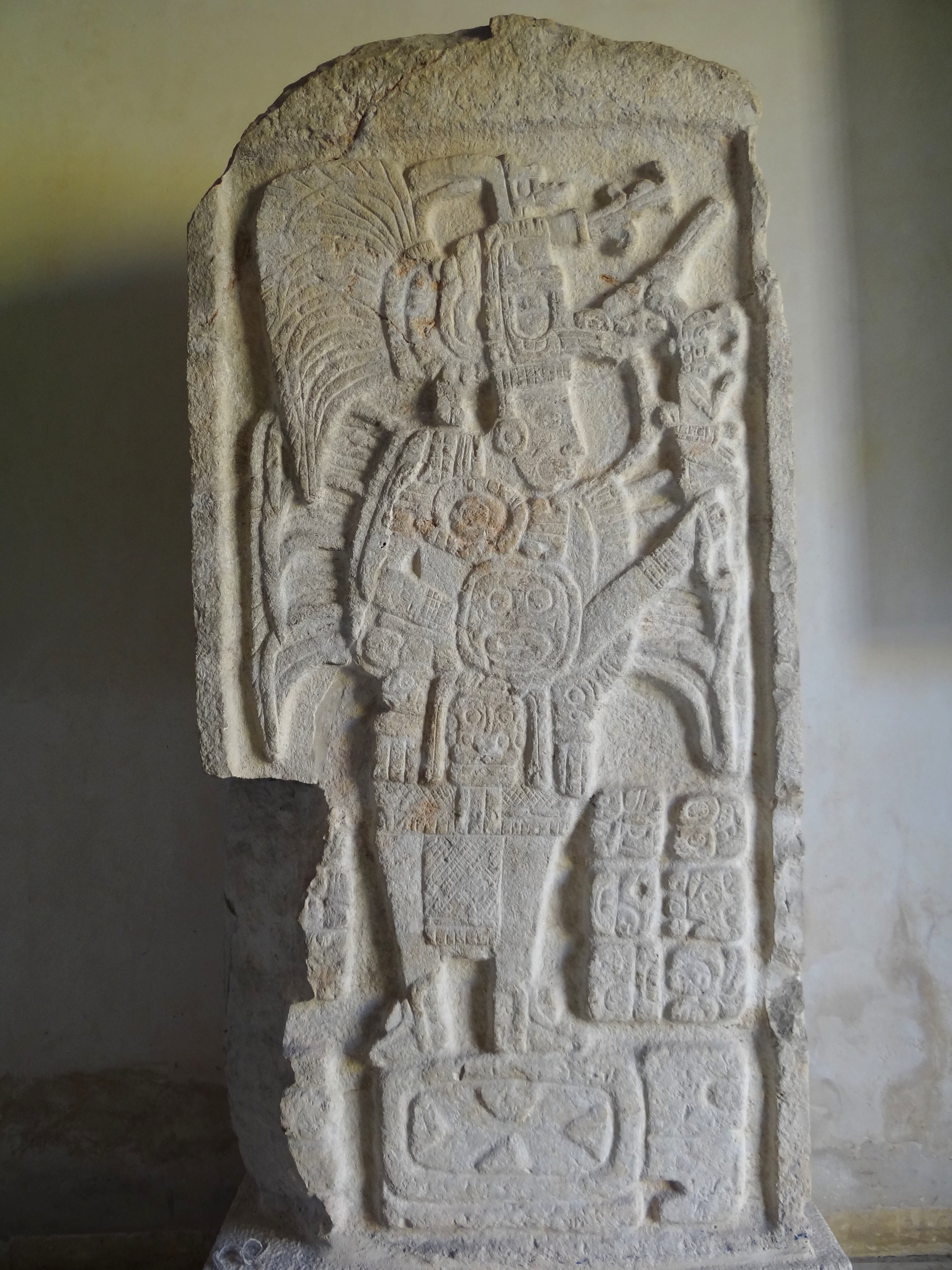
Maya stela at the Fort of San Miguel Museum.

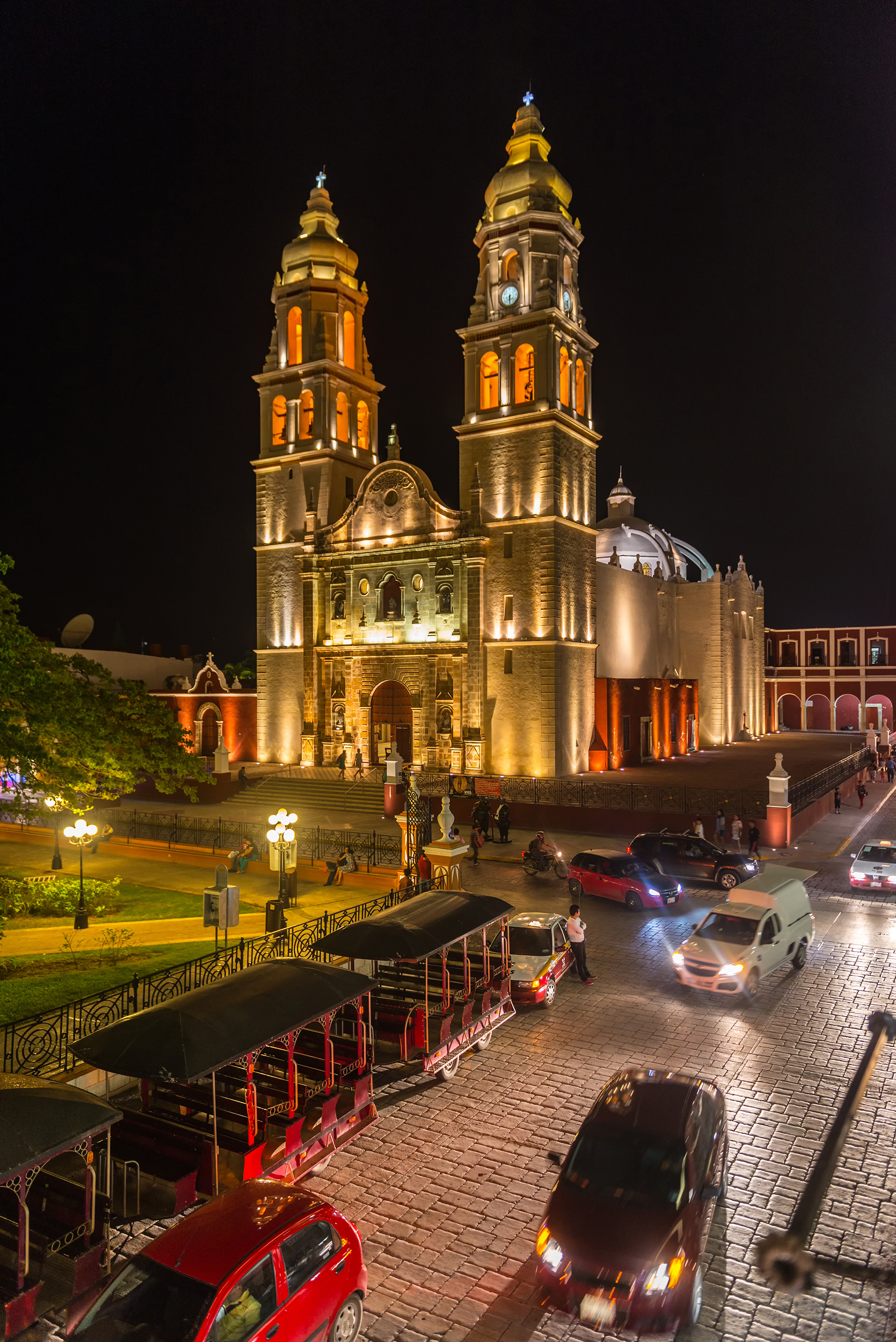
Cathedral of the city.

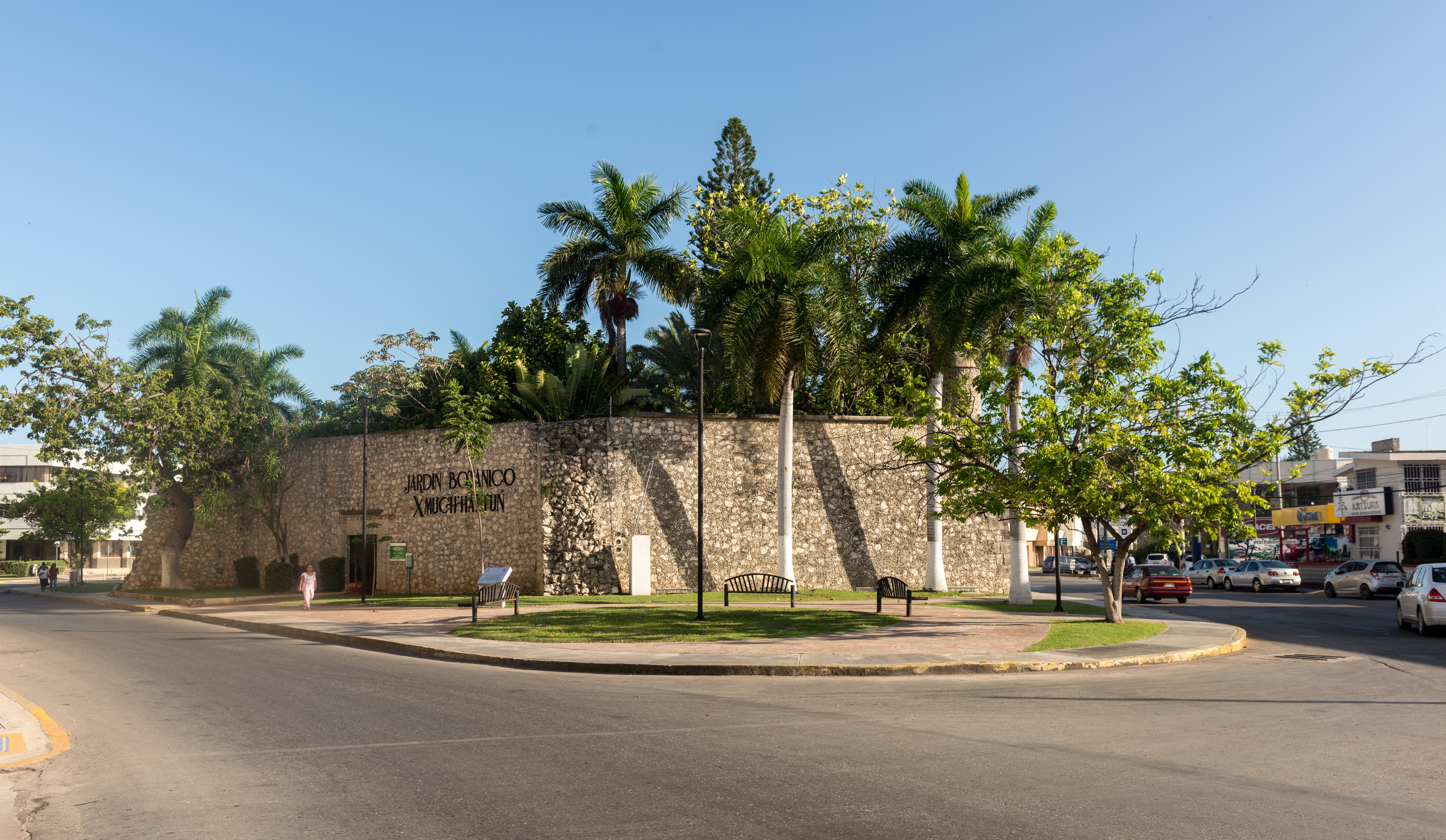
Jardín Botánico Xmuch' Haltun.

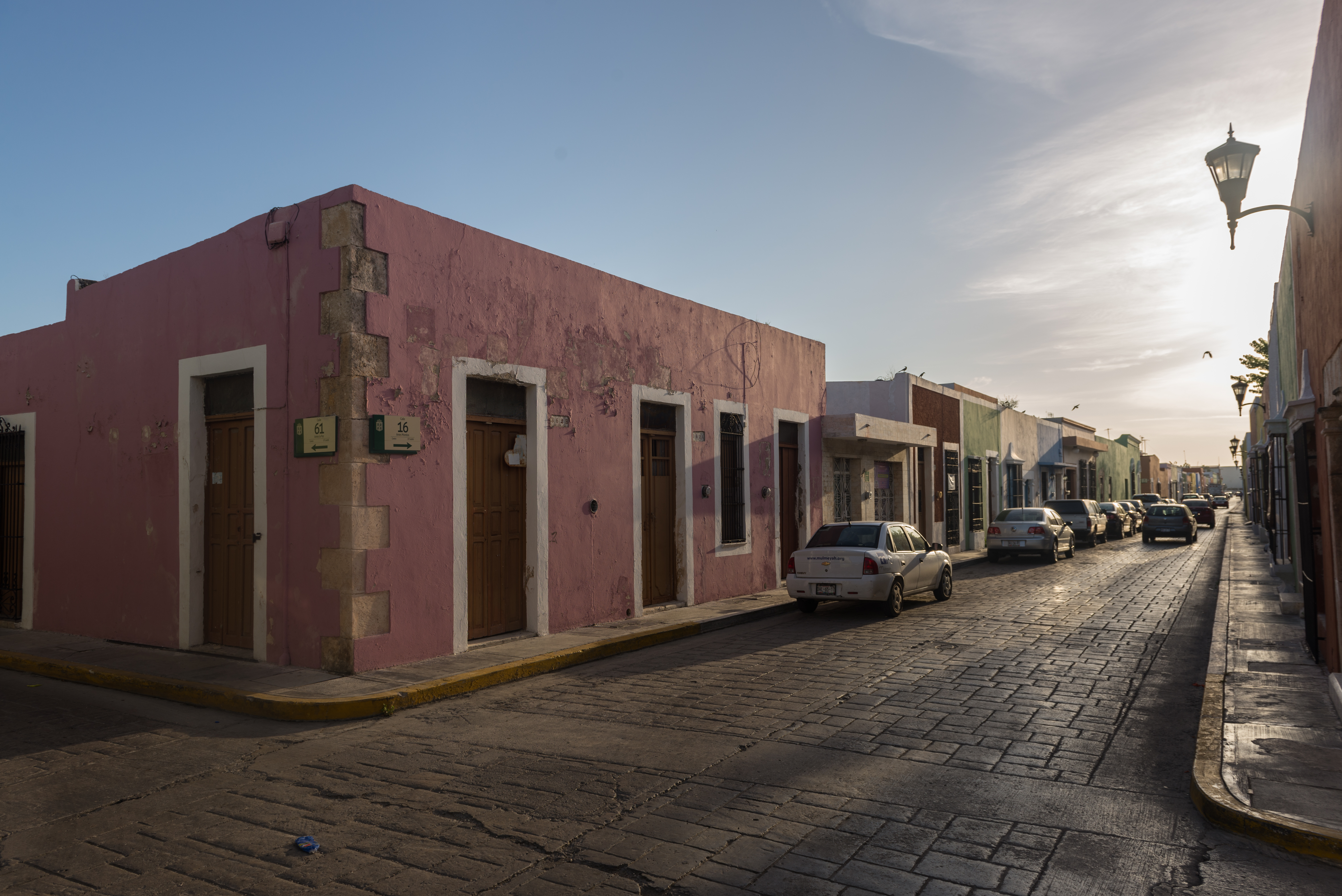
City of Campeche.

== Notable people ==
- Francisco S. Carvajal (1870-1931), was briefly the President of Mexico in 1914 during the Mexican Revolution
