= Campeche Cathedral =

Coordinates: 19.8461°N 90.5362°W

Our Lady of the Immaculate Conception Cathedral
- Catedral de Nuestra Señora de la Purísima Concepción
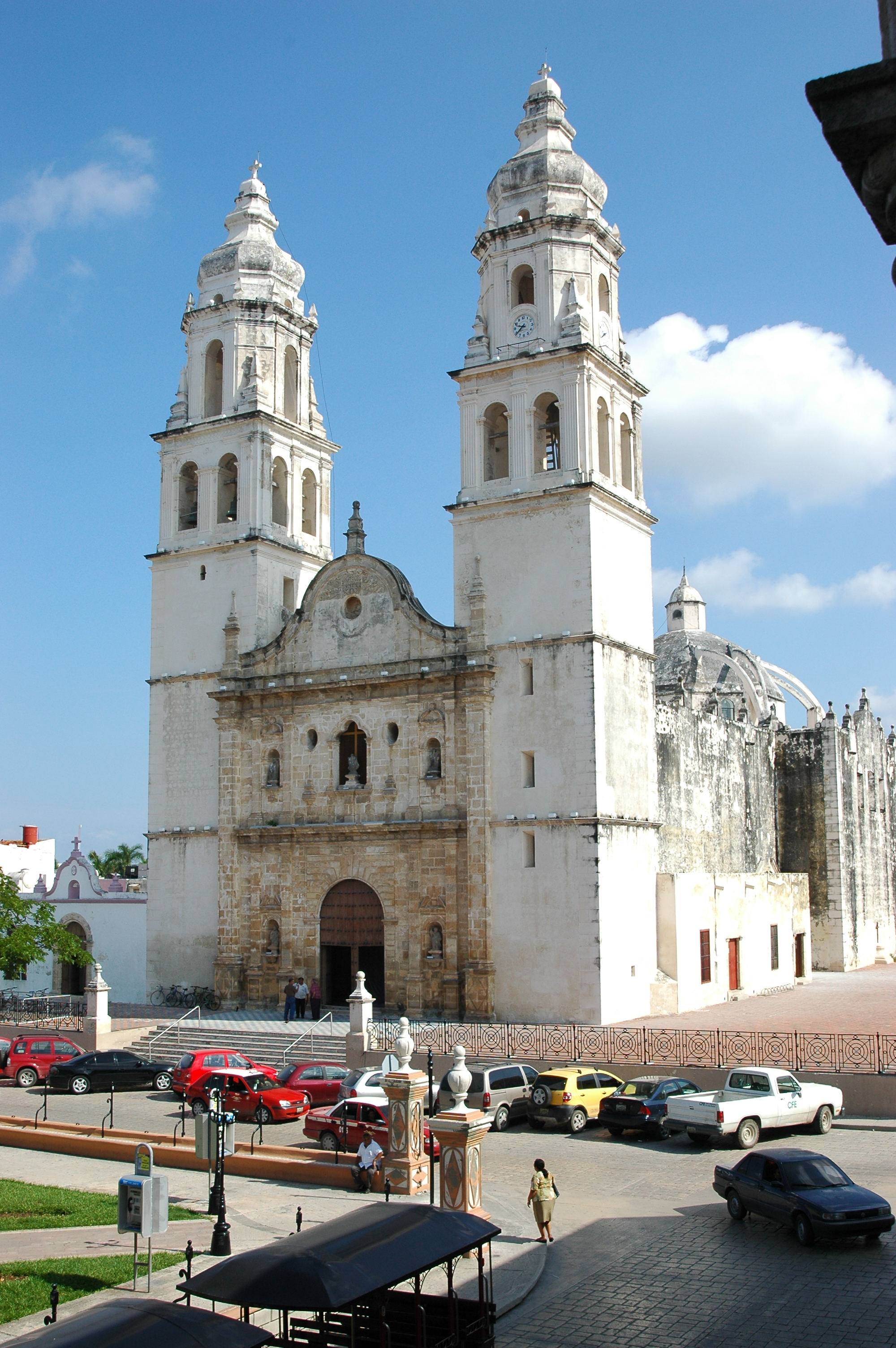
- Our Lady of the Immaculate Conception Cathedral
- Location: Campeche City
- Country: Mexico
- Denomination: Roman Catholic Church

The Our Lady of the Immaculate Conception Cathedral (Spanish: Catedral de Nuestra Señora de la Purísima Concepción) or Campeche Cathedral is the main Catholic building within the fortified Campeche City in Mexico, declared Cultural Patrimony of the Humanity. It is the main church of the diocese of the same name, seat of the bishopric. It is located in front of the Constitution Square of the city. The rank of cathedral was granted in 1895 by Pope Leo XIII.

It is a Baroque style building with features of the neoclassic, famous for sheltering in its interior figurines of sacred art, highlighting a monument called "The Holy Burial" that represents a coffin with the figure of Christ and that during Good Friday is carried by The main streets of the city. It was built between 1540 and 1760.

== See also ==
- Roman Catholicism in Mexico
- Our Lady of the Immaculate Conception
