= Lewis Scot =

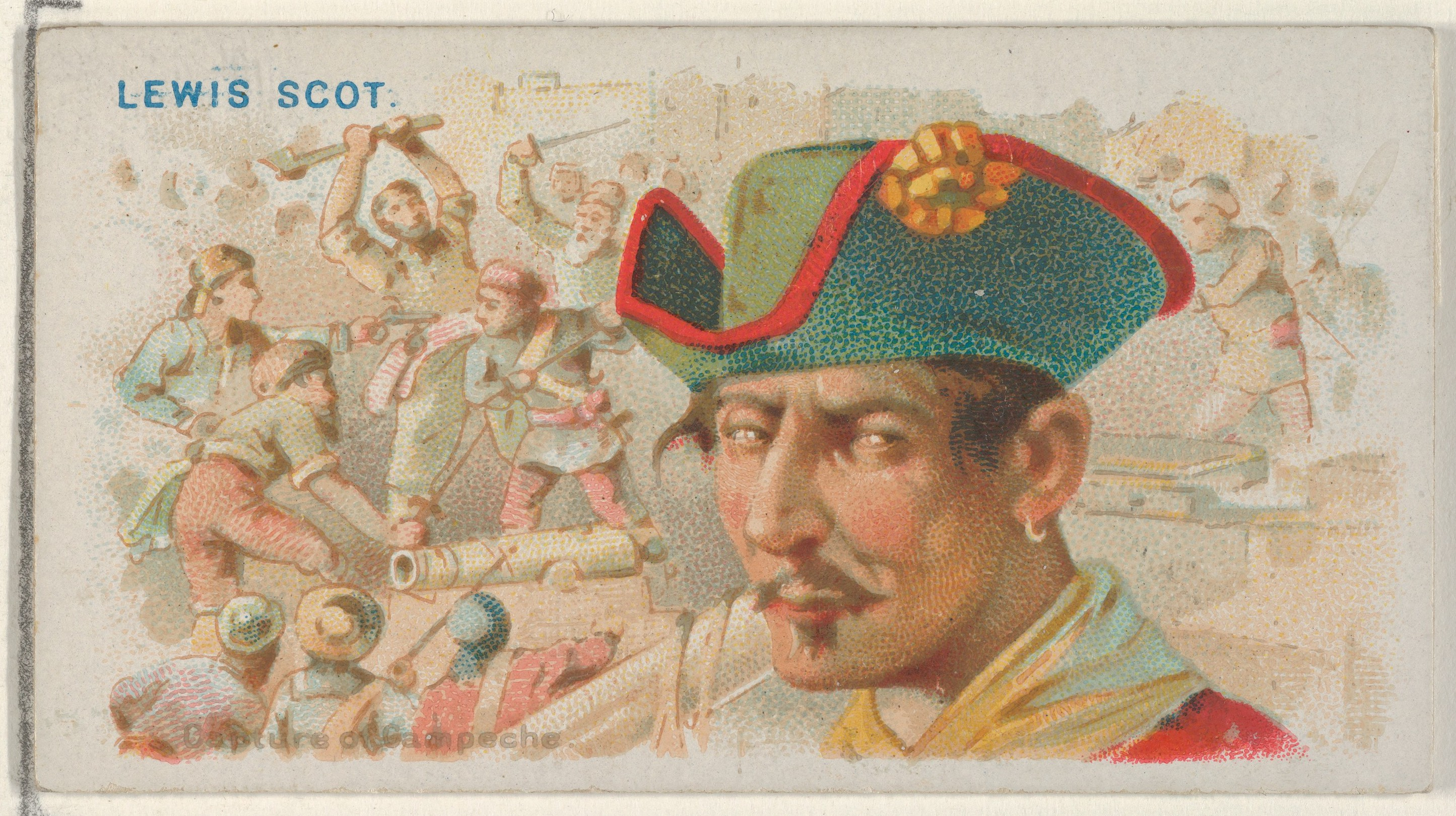
Lewis Scot, Capture of Campeche, from the Pirates of the Spanish Main series (N19) for Allen & Ginter Cigarettes MET DP835048

Lewis Scot was a Scottish buccaneer who, according to writer Alexander Esquemeling, was the first pirate to raid Spanish coastal settlements in the Caribbean and West Indies during the mid-seventeenth century.

Scot is especially known for his raid of the Spanish city of Campeche on Mexico's Yucatan Peninsula. After receiving a ransom for the city, he is said to have retired in Tortuga.
