= 1st federal electoral district of Campeche =

Federal electoral district of Mexico

Campeche's 1st
- Electoral district of the Chamber of Deputies of Mexico

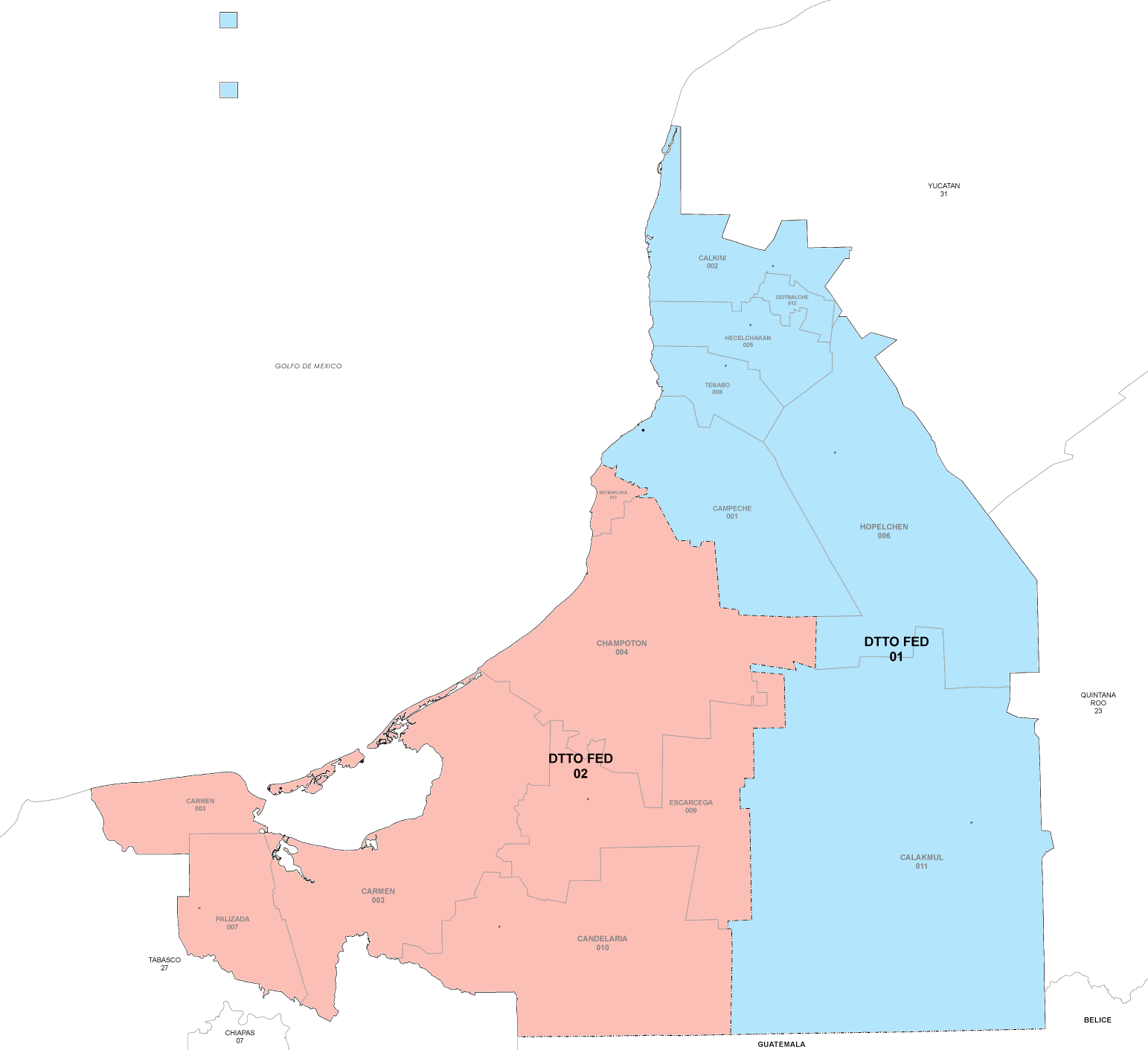
- 1st district

Incumbent
- Member: Elda Castillo Quintana
- Party: ▌Morena
- Congress: 66th (2024–2027)

District
- State: Campeche
- Head town: San Francisco de Campeche
- Coordinates: 19°51′N 90°31′W
- Covers: Calakmul, Calkiní, Campeche, Dzitbalché, Hecelchakán, Hopelchén, Tenabo
- PR region: Third
- Precincts: 259
- Population: 470,590 (2020 census)
- Indigenous: Yes (57%)

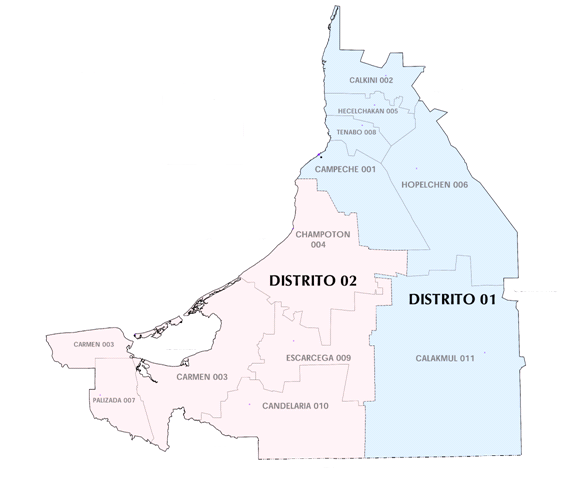
Campeche's 2017–2022 districts

The 1st federal electoral district of Campeche (Spanish: Distrito electoral federal 01 de Campeche) is one of the 300 electoral districts into which Mexico is divided for elections to the federal Chamber of Deputies and one of two such districts in the state of Campeche.

It elects one deputy to the lower house of Congress for each three-year legislative session by means of the first-past-the-post system. Votes cast in the district also count towards the calculation of proportional representation ("plurinominal") deputies elected from the third region.

The current member for the district, elected in the 2024 general election, is Elda Esther del Carmen Castillo Quintana of the National Regeneration Movement (Morena).

== District territory ==
Under the 2023 districting plan adopted by the National Electoral Institute (INE), which is to be used for the 2024, 2027 and 2030 federal elections, the first district comprises 259 electoral precincts (secciones electorales) across seven municipalities in the east of the state:

- Calakmul, Calkiní, Campeche, Dzitbalché, Hecelchakán, Hopelchén and Tenabo.

The district's head town (cabecera distrital), where results from individual polling stations are gathered together and tallied, is the state capital, San Francisco de Campeche.

The district reported a population of 470,590 in the 2020 census. With Indigenous and Afrodescendent inhabitants accounting for over 57% of that total, it is classified by the INE as an indigenous district. (Note: The INE deems any local or federal electoral district where Indigenous or Afrodescendent inhabitants number 40% or more of the population to be an indigenous district.)

== Previous districting schemes ==
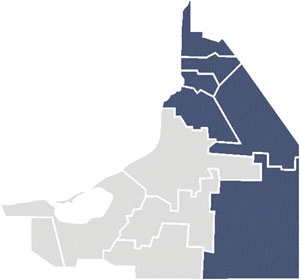
1st district in 2005–2017

Evolution of electoral district numbers
	1974	1978	1996	2005	2017	2023
Campeche	2	2	2	2	2	2
Chamber of Deputies	196	300				

2017–2022

In the 2017 plan, the district covered six municipalities: Calakmul, (Note: Calakmul was created by the Congress of Campeche from portions of Champotón and Hopelchén in 1996; because of the territorial dispute between Campeche and Quintana Roo, however, the electoral authorities continued to treat its territory as part of those municipalities until 2017.) Calkiní, Campeche, Hecelchakán, Hopelchén and Tenabo. Since Dzitbalché was a part of Calkiní until 2019, the district's territory was the same as the 2023 plan.

2005–2017

Under the 2005 districting scheme, it covered five municipalities: Campeche, Calkiní, Hecelchakán, Hopelchén and Tenabo.

1996–2005

Between 1996 and 2005, the district comprised the same five municipalities as in the 2005 scheme.

1978–1996

The districting scheme in force from 1978 to 1996 was the result of the 1977 electoral reforms, which increased the number of single-member seats in the Chamber of Deputies from 196 to 300. Campeche's seat allocation, however, remained unchanged at two. The 1st district had its head town at Ciudad del Carmen and it covered the municipalities of Carmen, Champotón and Palizada.

== Deputies returned to Congress ==
(Mexico) National parties
- Current
- PAN
- PRI
- PT
- PVEM
- MC
- Morena
- PAZ
- Somos
- Defunct or local only
- PLM
- PNR
- PRM
- PNM
- PP
- PPS
- PARM
- PFCRN
- CON
- PANAL
- PSD
- PES
- PES
- PRD

Campeche's 1st district
Election	Deputy	Party	Term	Legislature
1916	Juan Zurbarán Capmany		1916–1917	Constituent Congress of Querétaro
1917	Juan Zurbarán Capmany		1917–1918	27th Congress
1918	Arturo Baledón Gil		1918–1920	28th Congress
1920	Juan Zurbarán Capmany		1920–1922	29th Congress
1922	Eduardo R. Mena Córdova		1922–1924	30th Congress
1924	Silvestre Pavón Silva		1924–1926	31st Congress
1926	Raymundo Poveda		1926–1928	32nd Congress
1928	José del Carmen Hernández Pino		1928–1930	33rd Congress
1930	Ángel Castillo Lanz	Institutional Revolutionary Party	1930–1932	34th Congress
1932	Ángel Castillo Lanz	Institutional Revolutionary Party	1932–1934	35th Congress
1934	Pablo Emilio Sotelo Regil	Institutional Revolutionary Party	1934–1937	36th Congress
1937	Héctor Pérez Martínez	Institutional Revolutionary Party	1937–1940	37th Congress
1940	Alberto Trueba Urbina	Institutional Revolutionary Party	1940–1943	38th Congress
1943	Pedro Guerrero Martinez	Institutional Revolutionary Party	1943–1946	39th Congress
1946	Manuel J. López Hernández	Institutional Revolutionary Party	1946–1949	40th Congress
1949	Alberto Trueba Urbina	Institutional Revolutionary Party	1949–1952	41st Congress
1952	Fernando Lanz Duret Sierra	Institutional Revolutionary Party	1952 -1955	42nd Congress
1955	Tomás Aznar Álvarez	Institutional Revolutionary Party	1955–1958	43rd Congress
1958	José Ortiz Ávila	Institutional Revolutionary Party	1958–1961	44th Congress
1961	Manuel Pavón Bahaine	Institutional Revolutionary Party	1961–1963	45th Congress
1964	Carlos Pérez Cámara	Institutional Revolutionary Party	1964–1967	46th Congress
1967	Ramón Alcalá Ferrera	Institutional Revolutionary Party	1967–1970	47th Congress
1970	Rafael Rodríguez Barrera	Institutional Revolutionary Party	1970–1973	48th Congress
1973	Rosa María Martínez Denegri	Institutional Revolutionary Party	1973–1976	49th Congress
1976	Abelardo Carrillo Zavala	Institutional Revolutionary Party	1976–1979	50th Congress
1979	Rafael Armando Herrera Morales	Institutional Revolutionary Party	1979–1982	51st Congress
1982	Jorge Dzib Sotelo	Institutional Revolutionary Party	1982–1985	52nd Congress
1985	Elizabeth Cuevas Melken; Maclovio Bedoya Rico	Institutional Revolutionary Party	1985; 1986–1988	53rd Congress
1988	Eraclio Soberanis Sosa	Institutional Revolutionary Party	1988–1991	54th Congress
1991	Luis Alberto Fuentes Mena	Institutional Revolutionary Party	1991–1994	55th Congress
1994	Manuel Pacheco Arjona	Institutional Revolutionary Party	1994–1997	56th Congress
1997	Ramón Félix Santini Pech	Institutional Revolutionary Party	1997–2000	57th Congress
2000	Edilberto Jesús Buenfil Montalvo	Institutional Revolutionary Party	2000–2003	58th Congress
2003	Enrique Escalante Arceo	Institutional Revolutionary Party	2003–2006	59th Congress
2006	Víctor Manuel Méndez Lanz	Institutional Revolutionary Party	2006–2009	60th Congress
2009	Carlos Oznerol Pacheco Castro	Institutional Revolutionary Party	2009–2012	61st Congress
2012	Landy Margarita Berzunza Novelo	Institutional Revolutionary Party	2012–2015	62nd Congress
2015	Miguel Ángel Sulub Caamal	Institutional Revolutionary Party	2015–2018	63rd Congress
2018	Carlos Enrique Martínez Ake	National Regeneration Movement	2018–2021	64th Congress
2021	José Luis Flores Pacheco	Citizens' Movement (Mexico)	2021–2024	65th Congress
2024	Elda Esther del Carmen Castillo Quintana	National Regeneration Movement	2024–2027	66th Congress

== Presidential elections ==
Campeche's 1st district
Election	District won by	Party or coalition	%
2018	Andrés Manuel López Obrador	Juntos Haremos Historia	58.2363
2024 (Note: In the 2024 election, Campeche was the only state where Xóchitl Gálvez of the Fuerza y Corazón por México coalition placed third, behind Jorge Máynez of the Citizens' Movement.)	Claudia Sheinbaum Pardo	Sigamos Haciendo Historia	53.1547
