= Tenabo (disambiguation) =

Tenabo may refer to:

- Tenabo, a city in the Mexican state of Campeche
  - Tenabo railway station
- Tenabo Municipality, a municipality in the Mexican state of Campeche
- Mount Tenabo, a peak in Nevada, US
