= Hecelchakán railway station =

Railway station in Campeche, Mexico

Hecelchakán

General information
- Location: Hecelchakán, Campeche, Mexico
- Coordinates: 20.17515°N 90.15201°W
- Platforms: 2
- Tracks: 3

Services
Preceding station	Tren Maya	Following station
Tenabo toward Palenque	Tren Maya	Calkiní toward Cancún Airport

Hecelchakán is a train station located near Hecelchakán, Campeche.

== Tren Maya ==
Andrés Manuel López Obrador announced the Tren Maya project in his 2018 presidential campaign. On 13 August 2018, he announced the complete outline. The route of the new Tren Maya put Hecelchakán station on the route connecting San Francisco de Campeche railway station and Teya Mérida railway station.

Hecelchakán station serves as a station on Section 2 of the Maya Train, in the state of Campeche.
