= Hopelchén Municipality =

Municipality in the Mexican state of Campeche

Hopelchén
- Municipality

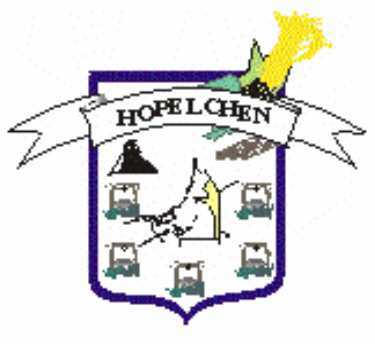
- Coat of arms

- Location within Campeche Location within Mexico
- Coordinates: 19°44′41″N 89°50′42″W
- Country: Mexico
- State: Campeche
- Municipal seat: Hopelchén

Government
  - Municipal president: Julio Alberto Sansores Sansores (2006–09)

Area
  - Total: 7,460.27 km^{2} (2,880.43 sq mi)

Population (2010)
  - Total: 37,777
  - Density: 5.0638/km^{2} (13.115/sq mi)
- Time zone: UTC−6 (CST)
- Spanish foundation: 1621
- City status: February 26, 1959
- Website: www.hopelchen.gob.mx

Hopelchén (Yucatec Maya: "place of five wells") is one of the 13 municipalities in the Mexican state of Campeche. It is situated inland in the north of the state. The municipal seat, and largest settlement, is the city of Hopelchén.

== Demographics ==
The 2005 INEGI census reported a population of 34,687, down from 36,271 in 1990. Of the 1990 figure, 17,664 spoke one of several indigenous languages, predominantly Yucatec Maya with 14,983 and Ch'ol with 2,039; the total number of indigenous language speakers had fallen to 15,416 by 2005. As of 2010, the municipality had a total population of 37,777.

As of 2010, the city of Hopelchén had a population of 7,295. Other than the city of Hopelchén, the municipality had 269 localities, the largest of which (with 2010 populations in parentheses) were: Bolonchén de Rejón (3,975), Vicente Guerrero (3,198), classified as urban, and Dzibalchén (2,340), Ukum (2,019), Xmabén (1,228), Suc-Tuc (1,179), and Chunchintok (1,086), classified as rural.

=== Mennonites ===
The 2020 INEGI census found that of the municipality's 42,170 residents, about 6,000 or 15% were Mennonites (a group of German and Dutch descent who speak the Plautdietsch German dialect). They were concentrated in the communities of Nuevo Progreso, El Temporal, Nuevo Durango, La Nueva Trinidad, Las Flores, Las Palmas, Santa Rosa, Santa Fe, La Estrella, and La Esperanza.

== Geography ==
The municipality of Hopelchén is bordered to the north and east by the state of Yucatán; to the south by the municipality of Calakmul, and to the west by the municipalities of Champotón, Campeche, Tenabo and Hecelchakán.

It covers 7,460.27 km^{2}, accounting for 13% of the state's total surface area.

=== Climate ===
Climate data for Hopelchén
Month	Jan	Feb	Mar	Apr	May	Jun	Jul	Aug	Sep	Oct	Nov	Dec	Year
Mean daily maximum °C (°F)	29.5 (85.1)	31.2 (88.2)	33.4 (92.1)	35.5 (95.9)	36 (97)	34.4 (93.9)	33.8 (92.8)	33.7 (92.7)	33.0 (91.4)	31.7 (89.1)	30.1 (86.2)	29.2 (84.6)	32.6 (90.7)
Mean daily minimum °C (°F)	14.8 (58.6)	15.1 (59.2)	16.7 (62.1)	18.2 (64.8)	19.2 (66.6)	19.0 (66.2)	18.8 (65.8)	19 (66)	18.7 (65.7)	18 (64)	16.0 (60.8)	14.8 (58.6)	17.3 (63.1)
Average precipitation mm (inches)	28 (1.1)	25 (1)	23 (0.9)	41 (1.6)	97 (3.8)	170 (6.8)	140 (5.4)	180 (6.9)	230 (8.9)	120 (4.6)	51 (2)	28 (1.1)	1,100 (44)
Source: Weatherbase

== Heritage ==
The Maya archaeological sites of Chunan-Tunich, Dzibilnocac, Santa Rosa Xtampak, Hochob and Pak-Chén are located in the municipality. It is also home to two cave complexes: Chuncedro and Xtacumbilxuna’an
