= Pomuch =

Town in Campeche, Mexico

- Village
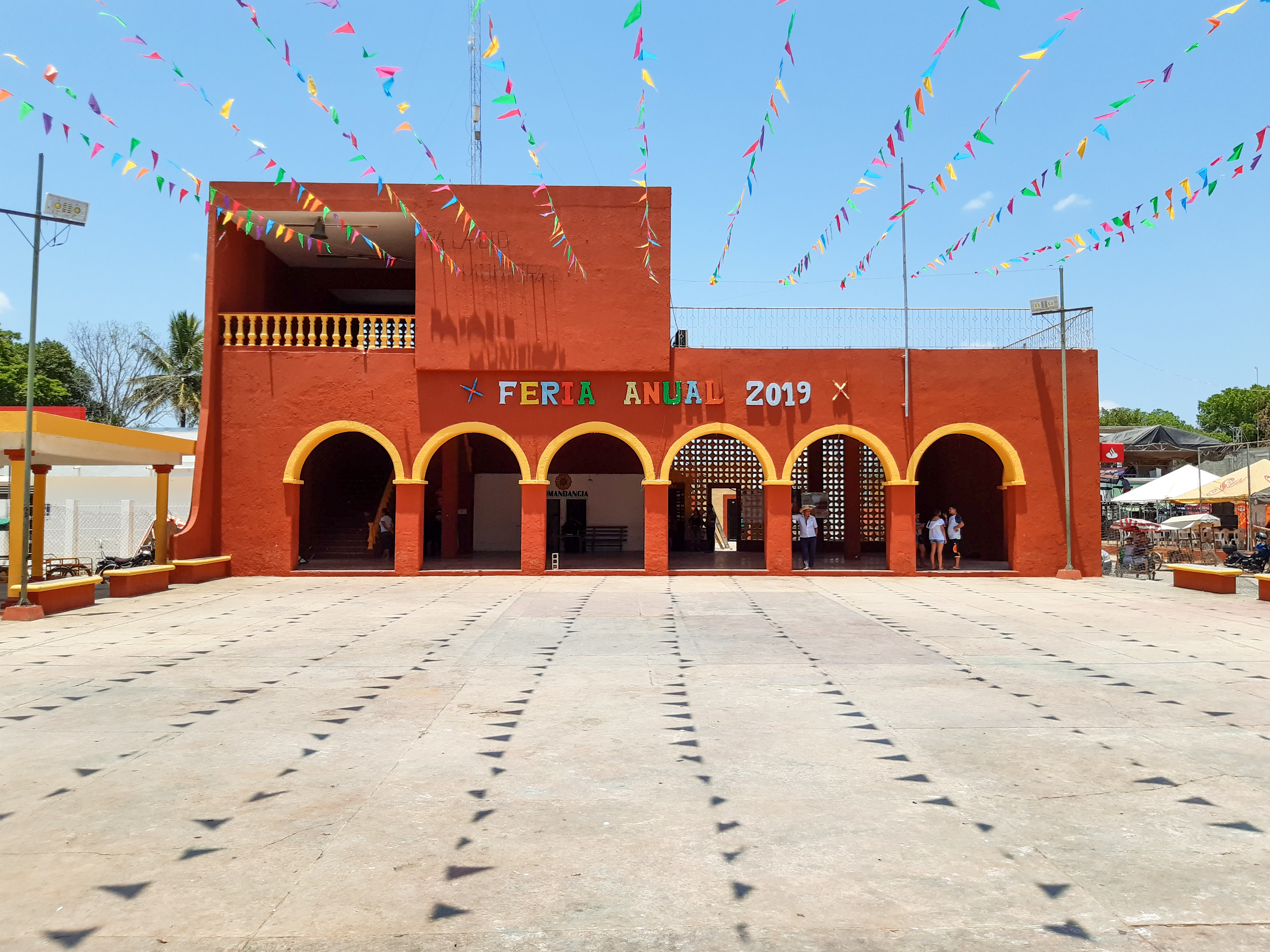
- Center of Pomuch

- Location within Campeche Location within Mexico
- Coordinates (yes): 20°8′15″N 90°10′28″W
- Country: Mexico
- State: Campeche
- Municipality: Hecelchakán

Government
  - Federal electoral district: Campeche's 1st
- Elevation: 30 ft (9.1 m)

Population (2020 census)
  - Total: 9,607
- Time zone: UTC-6 (Central Standard Time)
- Postal code: 24810
- Calling Code: 996

Pomuch is a town in the Mexican state of Campeche, located in the northern part of the state on the Yucatán Peninsula. Pomuch lies on the so-called camino real (royal road) between the city of Campeche and Mérida and is part of the municipality of Hecelchakán. Pomuch was originally known as Tixpokmuch ("where the toads swim or splash"), a Maya settlement founded in the fifteenth century.

Pomuch is known for its celebration of Day of the Dead. According to this tradition, the relatives of the deceased exhume their bones, clean them, and wrap them in cloths specially embroidered for the occasion. They then place them back in the grave and make the traditional offering of food and beverages. The tradition had declined in the early 2000s before a revival effort culminated in its recognition by the State of Campeche as an Intangible Cultural Heritage. The increased level of tourism has caused some controversy among local groups.

Pomuch is also known for its bread, with bakeries that have operated for five generations.

== History ==
Pomuch began as a settlement in the fifteenth century. It was known as Tixpokmuch, a name derived from the Maya terms tix, an onomatopoeia for the sound of dripping water; pok, imitating the sound of a toad falling; and much, meaning frog or toad. The name has been translated as "where the toads swim or splash". At one time it produced burial shrouds and lay along a Maya route to a nearby burial ground. The Spanish conquistador Francisco de Montejo founded San Francisco de Campeche, the future capital of the state of Campeche, in the sixteenth century and Pomuch came under its jurisdiction. Pomuch became part of the newly founded Hecelchakán municipality in 1916 before attaining the status of village in 2001.

La Huachita bakery in Pomuch

The bakery El Pan de Pomuch ("Pomuch's Bread") was reputedly founded in the eighteenth century. The city became known for its traditional bread, with its three main bakeries playing a significant role in Day of the Dead celebrations. The town's position on the camino real (royal road) between Campeche and Mérida also played a role in attracting tourists to its Indigenous culture and artisanal bread. The tourism route included nearby villages such as Calkiní and Bécal.

Like neighboring towns, Pomuch retained Maya–Spanish bilingualism and certain Maya customs, including the tradition of cleaning family members' bones. Known as Choo Ba'ak in the Yucatecan Maya language, it dates to at least the mid-nineteenth century, grounded in the precolonial belief that the dead journeyed to the underworld of Xibalba before returning. Deceased individuals are initially buried in sealed cement vaults for two to three years until soft tissue decomposes. Relatives then exhume the remains, clean and dust the bones, place them inside a wooden ossuary lined with cloth (paño), and display them in cemetery niches. Families return to the graveyard during Day of the Dead to clean the skeletons, change the cloths, and prepare tamales (pibipollo) for domestic altars.

=== Heritage designation ===
In the early twenty-first century, migration and religious diversification led to the decline of the bone-cleaning ritual in Pomuch. Local residents formed the Maya Kin cultural association to promote its preservation. The State Government of Campeche officially declared La limpieza de los santos restos (the cleaning of the holy remains) an Intangible Cultural Heritage in 2017. Day of the Dead festivities became known as Festival de Día de Muertos: Pomuch para el Mundo ("Pomuch for the World") in 2021, coordinated since 2022 by the Cultural Heritage Authority of the State of Campeche (APCEC). As part of the town's promotion of the event, a plaza was renamed Calzada de los Muertos (Avenue of the Dead) to accommodate festivities such as the annual Paseo de Pixanes (Passage of the Spirits).

By 2021, Day of the Dead in Pomuch was noted as having been a tourist attraction for decades. Attendance was in the hundreds. The town applied for the Pueblos Mágicos tourism label as its notoriety climbed in 2023, receiving Mex$55,000,000 in national funding for infrastructure, tourist facilities, and cultural preservation as part of the Tren Maya rail project. The Campeche state government estimated that 8,000 attendees generated Mex$9,000,000 in 2024.

A man holding a skull in Pomuch

The commercialization of the event caused some controversy. Tensions emerged over tourists filming private bone cleanings, as well as local authorities charging entry fees to the cemetery. In 2025, visitors were charged Mex$30 to enter the cemetery between 24 October and 30 October. The local Festival Organizing Committee issued a statement saying in part, "It is a private and intimate event, [and] we do not consider it right to reduce it to a commercial product as some authorities [have begun] to do without knowledge of the violation of sacred and private spaces." Residents were described as "split" about the decision, while a local politician, Carlos Ucán, called it a "fine line between sharing and monetizing" when families allowed public viewing of the remains. Activists formed the rival Festival Chéen Teech Kajá’anech Tin Tuukul ("you are only in my thoughts" festival) in response to the increased tourist activity.

== Demographics ==
According to the results of the 2020 Population and Housing Census conducted by the National Institute of Statistics and Geography (INEGI), Pomuch had 9,607 residents (4,856 women and 4,751 men) and 3,061 households, of which 2,551 (83.3%) were inhabited.

While historically a predominantly Roman Catholic community centered around the Parish of the Immaculate Conception, the village's religious demographics have shifted over time. Catholics made up 51.5% of the population in 2020, down from 54.7% (4,752 residents) in 2010.

The local church was founded by Franciscans in the sixteenth century. Residents use the communal ejido system for agriculture, a legacy of the city's Maya heritage.

== Transportation ==
Pomuch is on Section 2 of the Tren Maya regional network, along the Escárcega–Calkiní line. Rail construction overseen by the National Fund for the Promotion of Tourism (Fonatur) brought disputes over employment and payments between 2020 and 2022. Pomuch served as a storage site for construction materials in 2020. Residents of nearby Dzitbalché and Bacabchén complained that locals were not offered jobs on the construction project. About 9 kilometres (5.6 mi) of existing railway through Pomuch was removed in 2021, but work halted after workers reported not being paid. In 2022, sascab was excavated from communal ejido land in Pomuch for the railway and members of the ejido accused the construction company Grupo Carso of failure to pay. City residents blocked access to extraction sites in April. Carso paid the ejido Mex$1,120,000 for the sascab and other material in May and agreed to a further Mex$240,000 in compensation for the delayed payments.

Pomuch does not have a passenger station. The closest station is in Hecelchakán some 6–7 kilometres (3.7–4.3 mi) away. However, in 2023 Tren Maya identified Pomuch as the site for a transfer station to trasport fuel and other goods. Many residents travel on foot or by bicycle, with as many as 500 a day using a pedestrian crossing that was replaced by a vehicle bridge in 2023.

== Education ==
Pomuch is home to a campus of the College of Scientific and Technological Studies of the State of Campeche (CECyTEC). Programs offered include administrative management processes, construction, general nursing, and programming. CECyTEC is a decentralized system of educación media superior tecnológica, providing upper secondary education with a focus on science and technical training.

== Culture ==
=== Pomuch Fair ===
The Pomuch Fair is held each spring following Holy Week and religious festivities honoring the Immaculate Conception. The fair features bullfighting and dancing. The fair celebrated its 115th anniversary in 2026, with a local newspaper dubbing it the "city of bread".

=== Day of the Dead ===
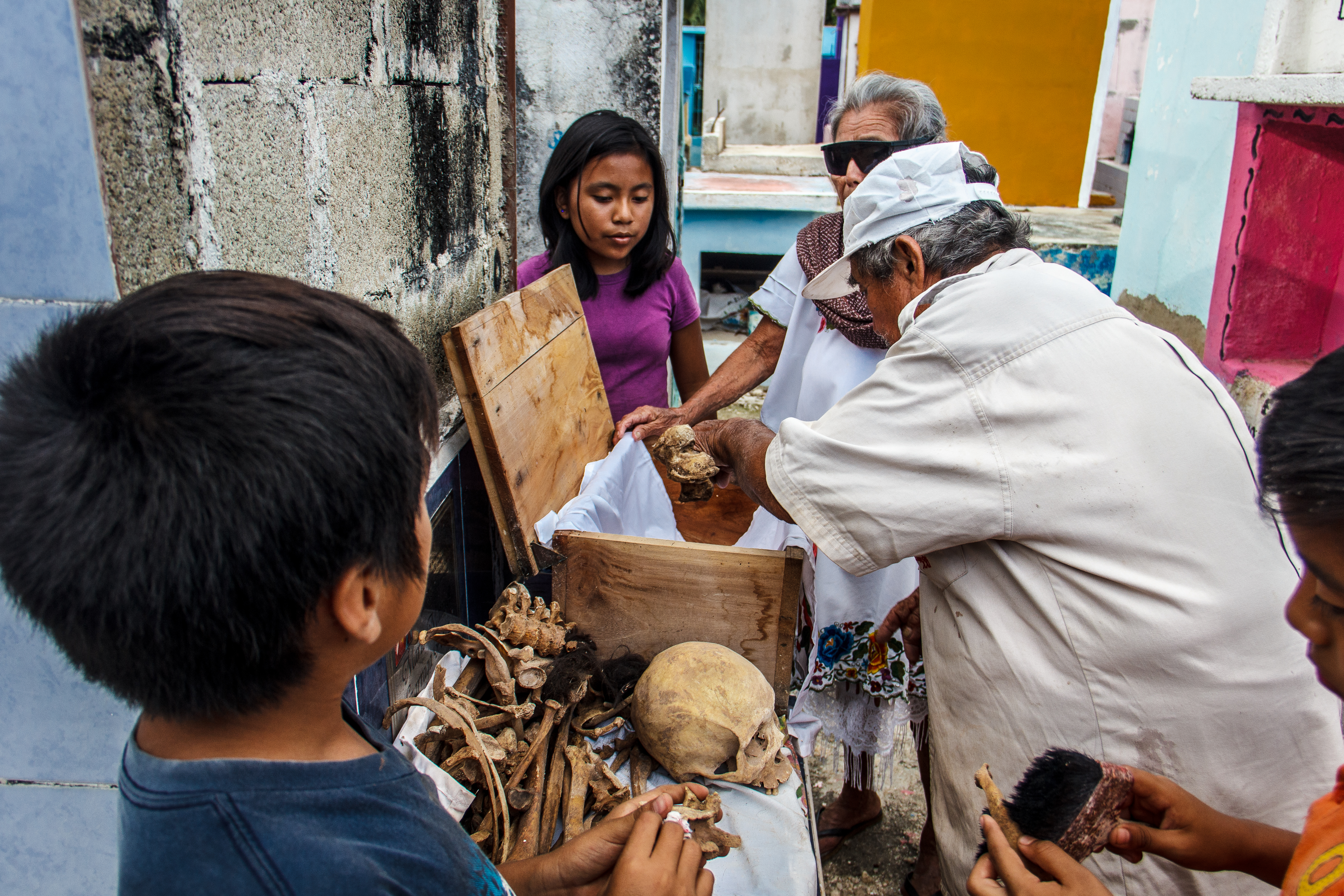
Day of the Dead traditions

Preparations for Day of the Dead festivities begin in the last week of October. Families gather to clean the bones of their loved ones and repaint their cemetery niches. Those unable to do the cleaning themselves can hire someone to perform the task. One resident estimated in 2025 that he cleaned 200 sets of bones annually, sometimes on behalf of those weary of the ritual's public attention. This period is also when residents harvest newly ripened maize (xpataan), gather banana leaves, collect firewood and stones for underground baking pits, and construct household altars to the deceased.

On 31 October, U Hanal Palal is dedicated to the souls of deceased children, who are believed to visit their relatives. Altars for children are decorated with candles, fresh flowers, toys, and animal-shaped clay whistles (silbatos). Food offerings known as janal pixán (food for the souls) consist of light items such as porridge and hot chocolate, while heavy ceremonial dishes depend on dietary customs.

U Hanal Nuchenob (All Saints' Day) on 1 November is dedicated to adult souls of the departed, who also visit according to tradition. Observances conclude on 2 November (All Souls' Day) with cemetery visits and Catholic mass, followed eight days later by the Biix, a farewell ritual where final prayers and offerings guide the spirits on their return journey.

=== Bakeries ===
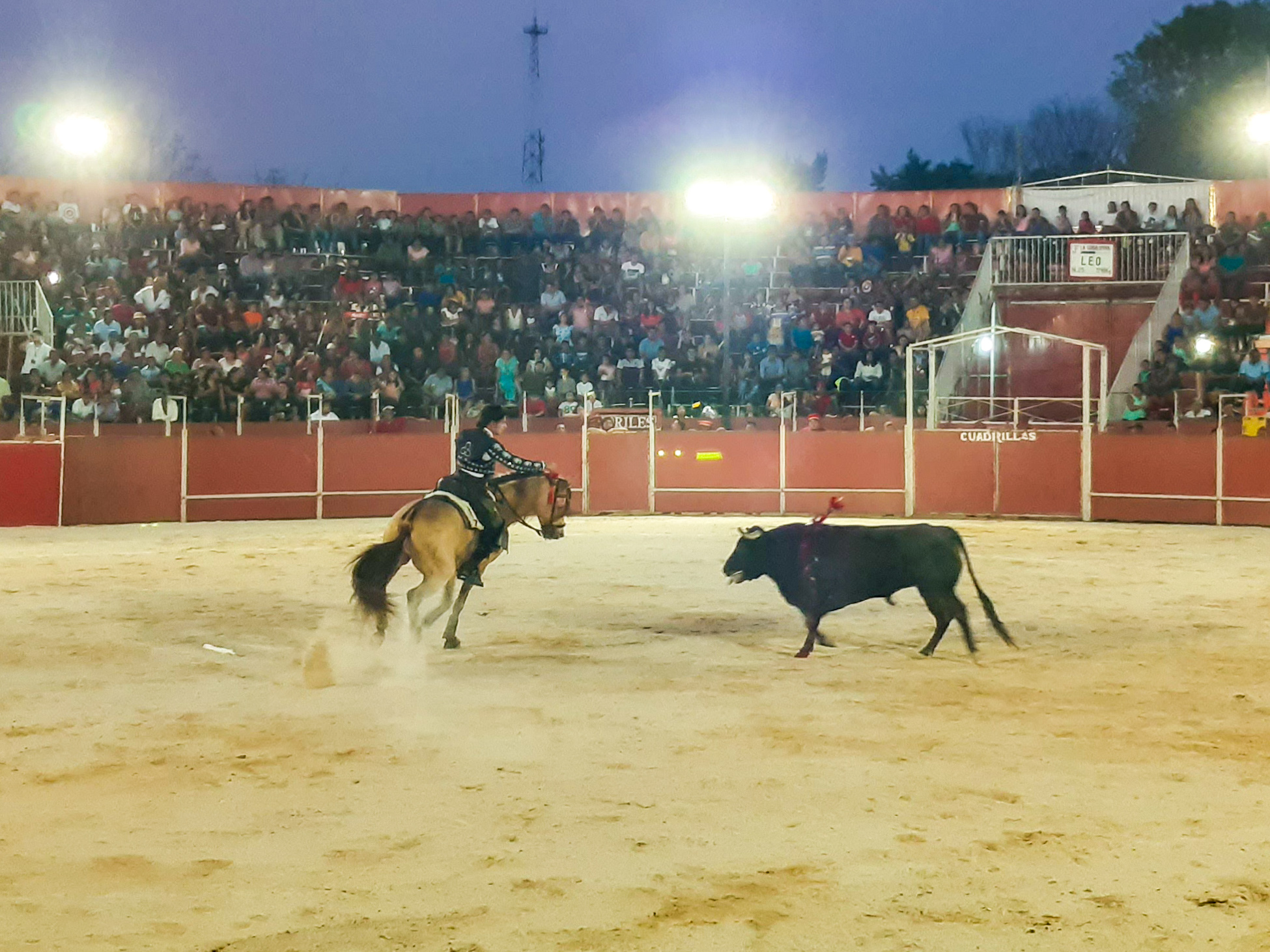
Bullfighting during the spring fair

There is a long-standing tradition of bread making in the town. Many varieties such as the braided bread and pan de pichón are said to go back five generations. So-called pan de Pomuch (Pomuch bread) gets its distinctive flavor from wood-fired ovens and lard. Mario Manuel Lizárraga Pérez, owner of La Huachita bakery, credited the choice of ingredients and his rolling and kneading process to the bread's shelf life of ten to fifteen days.

Pan de pichón (pigeon bread), a French-style roll stuffed with ham, cheese, and chiles, is a particular specialty of the town. The whey from the cheese drips when eaten fresh. The third-generation owner of La Huachita is said to have ordered a special bread from his baker and coined the name when a baby pigeon landed on the table. It has been reported as the most popular bread at local bakeries, in addition to huachirrosca, a puff pastry filled with ham and cheese, and other breads known as tutis and camelias. Sales are seasonal, dropping by as much as 30–40% after the spring fair and increasing again during the rainy fall season.

== Places of interest ==
Pomuch is located 40 kilometres (25 mi) km from Jaina Island and its archaeological site. The funerary rites of Jaina Island, which was formerly a necropolis, are associated with the pre-Hispanic origins of the Day of the Dead tradition in Pomuch. When Pomuch secured Day of the Dead infrastructure investments in 2023, the mayor suggested that in addition to the Xcalumkín archaeological site east of Hecelchakán, some funding should ensure direct access to Jaina. A former governor of Campeche had funded a road between Jaina and Pomuch, but it was inaccessible at that time.

== Bibliography ==
- Apipilhuasco Miranda, María Fernanda (30 June 2025). "Entre festivales y huesos. La politización de los rituales mortuorios en México" [Between festivals and bones: the politicization of mortuary rituals in Mexico]. Península (in Spanish). 20 (2): 185–212. doi:10.22201/cephcis.25942743e.2025.20.2.90725.
- Brito Benítez, Eva Leticia; Chung, Heajoo (2015). "Food for the Soul: Eternal Co-existence in the Mayan-Catholic Traditions of Pomuch, Mexico". International Journal of Intangible Heritage. 10: 74–83. Archived from the original on 3 October 2026.
- Hernández Patricio, Paola; Rea Sunza, Miriam; Rodríguez Iglesias, Paulina (2014). "Hanal Pixán: limpieza de huesos, tradición única" [Hanal Pixán: bone cleansing, unique tradition]. Vita Brevis (in Spanish). 3 (5). Instituto Nacional de Antropología e Historia. Archived from the original on 5 December 2024.
