= Edilberto Buenfil Montalvo =

Mexican politician

- Born: 7 January 1938 (age 88); Mexico City, Mexico
- Occupation: Politician
- Political party: PRI

Edilberto Jesús Buenfil Montalvo (born 7 January 1938) is a Mexican politician from the Institutional Revolutionary Party (PRI). In the 2000 general election he was elected to the Chamber of Deputies to represent Campeche's 1st district during the 58th session of Congress.
