= Hochob =

Mayan archaeological site in Campeche, Mexico

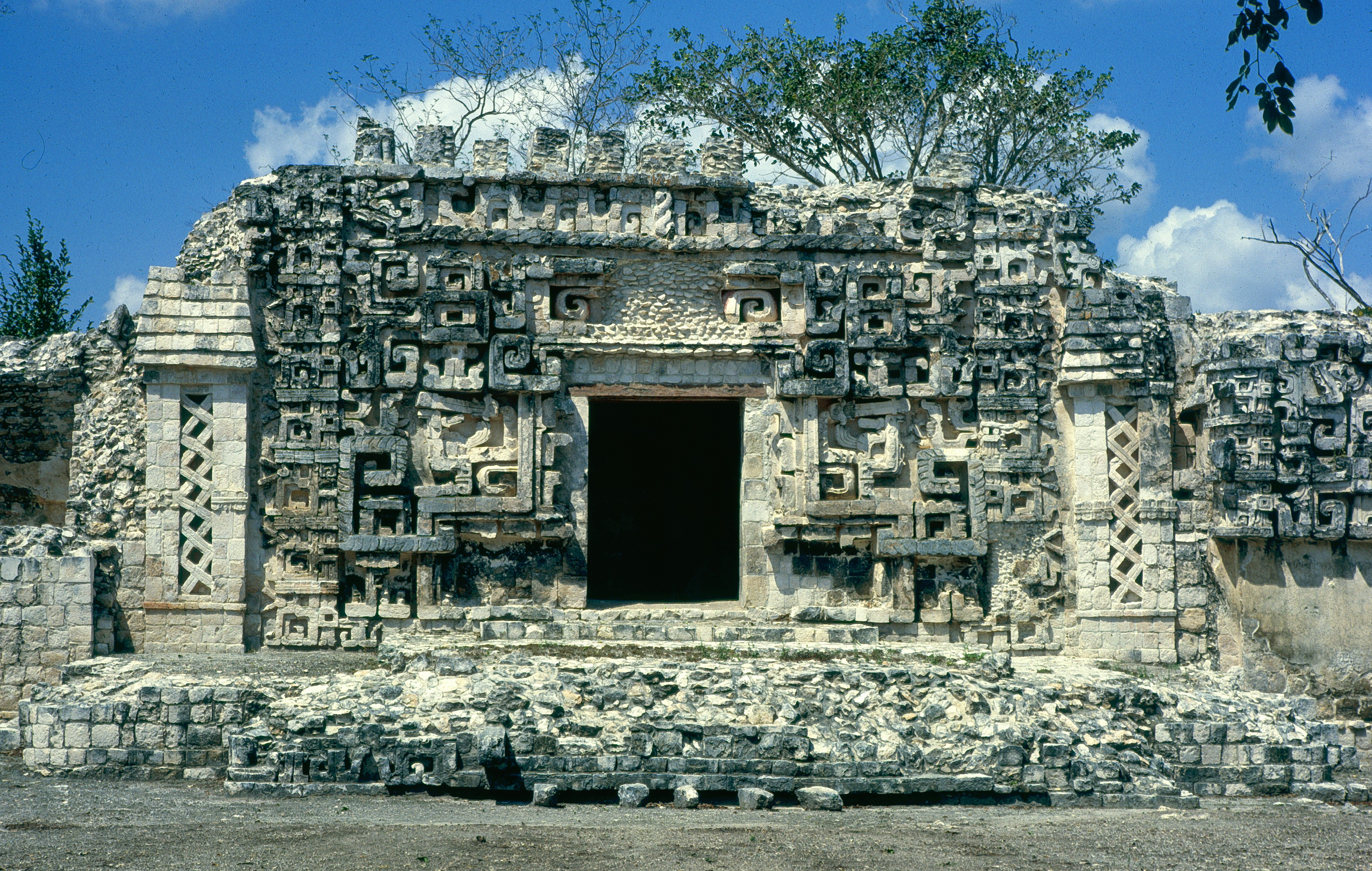
Structure II

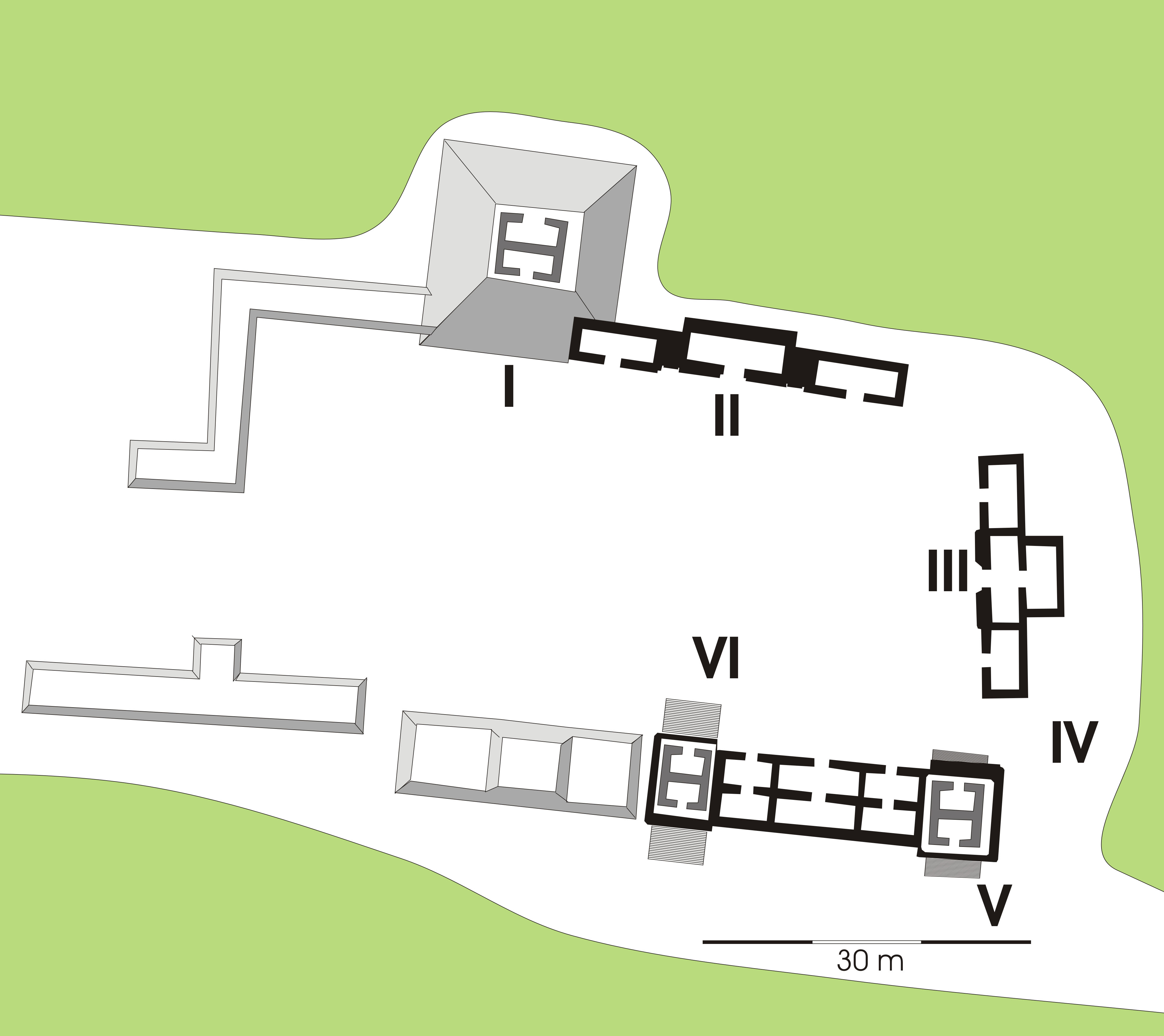
Hochob Plan.

Hochob is an archaeological site Maya culture located in the Mexican state of Campeche, about 10 minutes from the city of Dzibalchén, in the region called The Chenes. The first news about the existence of this archaeological site was due to the researcher and explorer Teobert Maler, who visited the place in 1887 and published some photographs in the Globus magazine in 1895.

The site was built on a natural hill approximately 30 meters high, whose upper part was flattened to be used as a base for the only set of constructions in the place. Its dimensions are approximately 200 meters from east to west, and 50 meters wide north to south.

The facades of the buildings in general show profuse decoration in the purest "Chenes" style, based on large and small stone blocks perfectly arranged to form emotional masks of the god Itzamná, whose threatening open jaws announce the entrance of the buildings that surely housed temples, chambers and priestly chambers.

A life-size replica of a main façade exists in the National Museum of Anthropology in Mexico City.

== Toponymy ==
The name of Hochob comes from the Maya language and means "place of the corncobs".

== History ==
Although there is not a perfectly defined chronology, the date of occupation of Hochob may have been during the late classic, around the year 800.

== Main Structures ==
The site is made up of a group of structures distributed in three plazas: Plaza I or Principal is limited to the East by the Palacio del Este or Structure I, to the North by the Palacio Principal or Structure II, Structure III and a corner platform that bends to the south. On its southern side there are 4 structures linked together by low platforms.

- Palace of The East or Structure I. It is made up of 3 rooms with a total length of 22 m. about. Its central facade is made up of an integral zoomorphic mask that surrounds the entrance and the facades of the buildings on the sides are practically smooth, with simple horizontal moldings of 2 or three elements.
- Main Palace or Structure II. It has a façade divided into three parts, of which the central part consists of an enormous integral figurehead of Itzamná: its eyes with strabismus and the frown can be seen in the upper part of the entrance opening, the huge earspools on the sides and, by way of access, the open jaws of the Monster of the Earth, whose lower jaw is made up of a small platform with fangs at the ends. The corners of the building are decorated with cascades of masks of Chaac seen in profile, and on its upper part there are remains of cresting. The rooms on the sides have partial zoomorphic masks on the upper part of the entrance and, together with the rest of the building, constitute one of the best examples of the architectural style known as Chenes. In the back part of Structure II there are some holes in the ground, which are the mouths of the chultunes that the ancient Maya created to capture, store and distribute rainwater.
- Frame III. It is characterized by the presence of towers crowned by false temples, with simulated stairways, typical of the Río Bec style.
- Structures V and VI. These form a pyramid-temple complex at both ends of a building made up of 6 rooms. Unlike structure III, the stairways leading to the temples are functional, although they have a very steep slope. The rooms of the temples have arches and their walls are flat, both at the top and bottom, adorned only with protruding stones above the moldings of the cornices, on which stucco sculptures possibly existed.

== See also ==
- Becan
- Calakmul
- Campeche
- Maya civilization
- Dzibilnocac
- Edzna
- Hormiguero
