= Campeche Light Train =

Guided bus line in Campeche, Mexico

Tren Ligero de Campeche
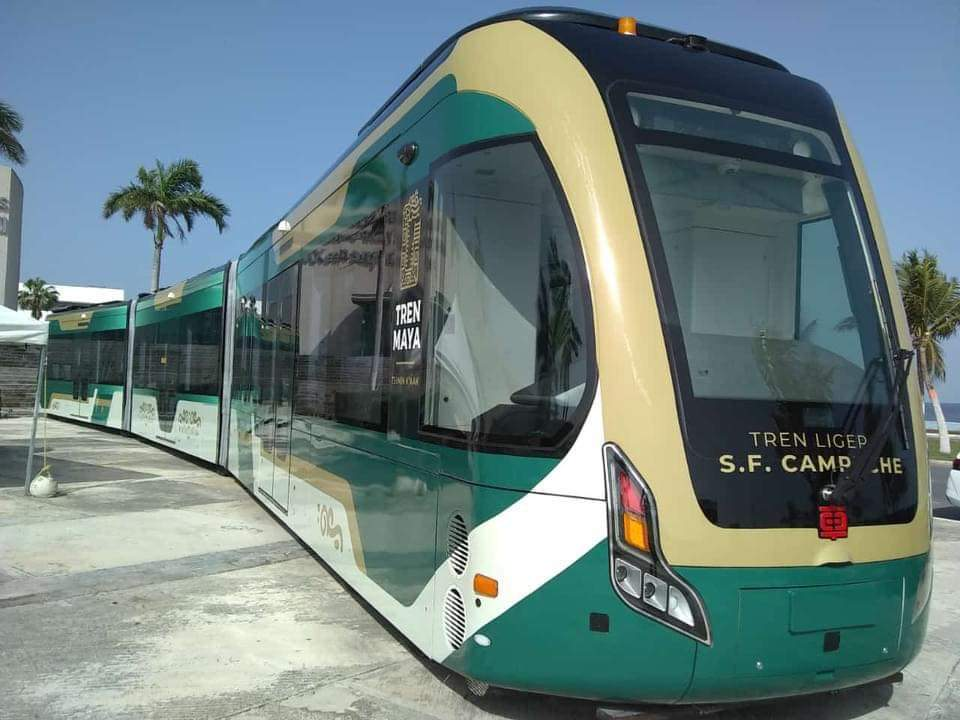

Overview
- Owner: Government of the State of Campeche
- Area served: City of Campeche, Campeche
- Locale: Campeche
- Transit type: Autonomous Rapid Transit; Guided bus Bi-articulated bus
- Number of stations: 14 (14 major stations and 1 minor stop)

Operation
- Began operation: July 20, 2025
- Number of vehicles: 5 vehicles

Technical
- System length: 15.2 km (9.4 mi)
System map
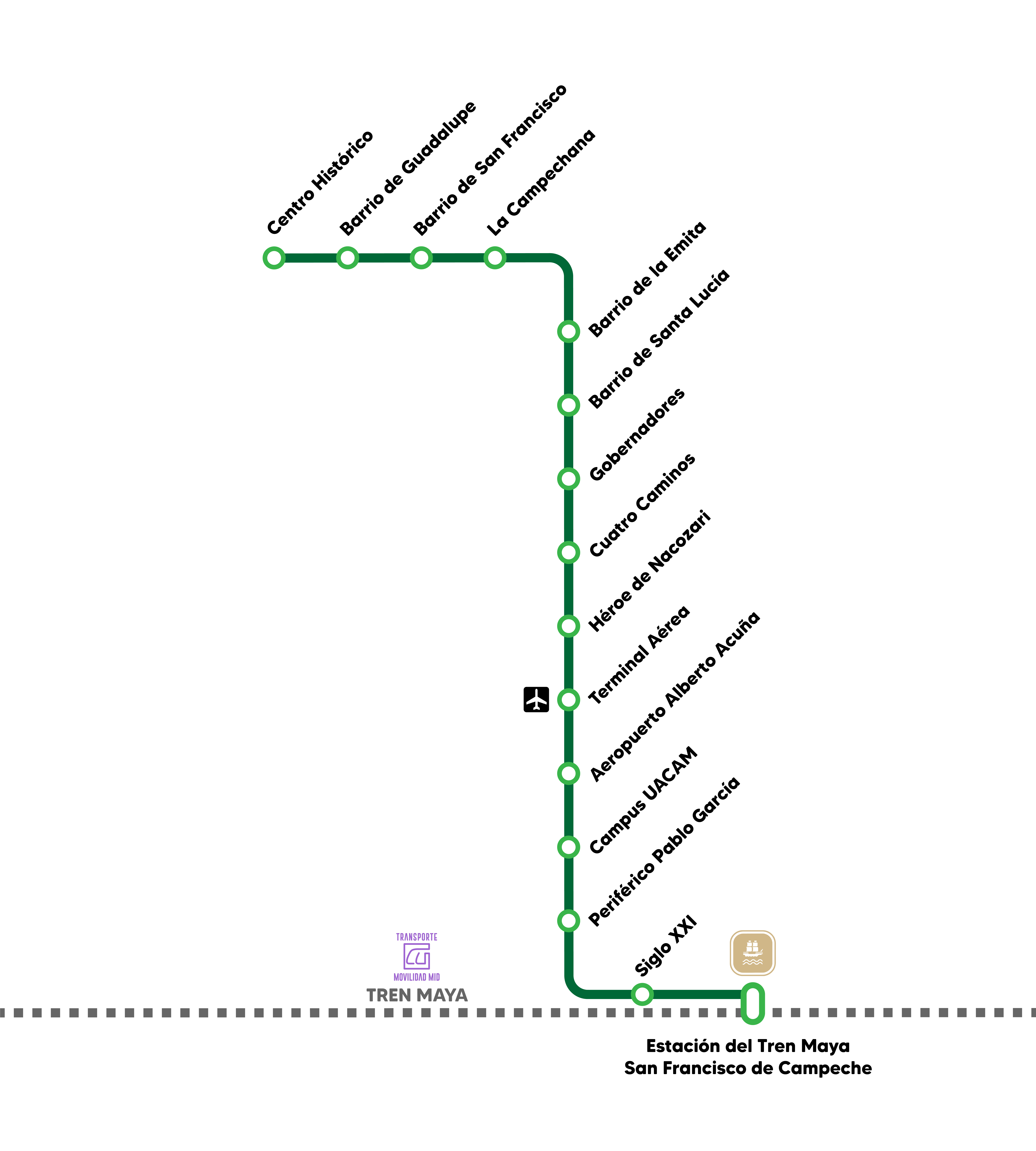

The Campeche Light Train (Spanish: Tren Ligero de Campeche) is an Autonomous Rapid Transit (ART) bus line which connects the historic center of San Francisco de Campeche with its airport and its train station. It was originally planned to be a light rail line, but to save time and costs, it is now as an ART guided bus. It opened to the public on July 20, 2025.

== History ==
=== Planning ===
On December 22, 2021, the governor of Campeche, Layda Sansores, signed a collaboration agreement with the director of the Railway Transport Regulatory Agency (Spanish: Agencia Reguladora del Transporte Ferroviario, ARTF) David Camacho. This agreement sought to promote the expansion of the railways in the state of Campeche.

Through the Secretariat of Infrastructure, Communications and Transportation (SICT), 29 million pesos were requested to carry out the pre-investment studies of the project, which would consist of an extension of 20.7 km (12.9 mi). It was expected that the construction of the light rail would use the existing railway infrastructure that corresponds to the FA and FL lines, which were in disuse. Originally, it was expected that the project would be financed with resources from the National Infrastructure Fund (Spanish: Fondo Nacional de Infraestructura, FONADIN), but later it was announced that its financing would be carried out with funds from the Federal Government of Mexico.

The project had an initial investment of 5 billion pesos and for its construction it was expected not to enable new tracks, since it would pass through the old railroad tracks, which would save money in the construction of the project. On September 14, 2023, it was announced that the train would no longer be a light rail, but would be an ART guided bus, because all the railroad tracks that would pass through the city would be removed to build concrete roads. The Light Rail project include stations at Ermita, the historic center of Campeche, Héroe de Nacozari Avenue, and the Malecón de Campeche.

=== Construction ===
In April 2024, construction work began with the preparation of the land on Héroe de Nacozari Avenue, where sleepers and the railway track began to be removed. Due to the magnitude of the project, it was expected that a considerable number of trees and palm trees would be removed, although at the time there was no official information about it, reportedly due to election silence laws. The project was expected to be completed by August 2024. After a controversy over the lack of construction licenses and various permits such as the presentation of the Executive Project and the Environmental Impact Statement (EIS), the construction work would be suspended. This suspension would later be overturned after a resolution of the Court of Administrative Justice.

After this, the head of the Mayan Train Operations Coordination Center of the Secretariat of National Defense (SEDENA), Blas Andrés Núñez, changed the start date of operations of the Light Rail to April 2025. In the end, it opened for public free rides on July 20, 2025.

== Vehicle fleet ==
It was initially expected that the trains used for the project would be road–rail vehicles, which would allow them to go on railroad tracks and also on normal streets. However, after it was decided to build concrete roads instead of railroad tracks, it was decided to buy ART guided buses. Despite the name, these vehicles are not autonomous. By the end of July 2024, CRRC brought a demonstration unit to Campeche that was previously tested on the Ecovía line in Monterrey, Nuevo León. This vehicle is similar to those that are expected to be used on Metrorrey Line 5 in the same city.

There are five three-car articulated units each with a capacity of 304 people. They run every 15 to 30 minutes and the service as a whole has a total capacity of 1,200 passengers per hour and direction.
