= Tenabo railway station =

Railway station in Campeche, Mexico

Tenabo

General information
- Location: Tenabo, Campeche, Mexico
- Coordinates: 20.04002°N 90.24448°W
- Platforms: 2
- Tracks: 3

Services
Preceding station	Tren Maya	Following station
San Francisco de Campeche toward Palenque	Tren Maya	Hecelchakán toward Cancún Airport

Tenabo is a train station located near Tenabo, Campeche.

== Tren Maya ==
Andrés Manuel López Obrador announced the Tren Maya project in his 2018 presidential campaign. On 13 August 2018, he announced the complete outline. The route of the new Tren Maya put Tenabo station on the route that would connect San Francisco de Campeche railway station and Teya Mérida railway station.

The Tenabo Station serves as a station on Section 2 of the Maya Train, in the state of Campeche.
