= Calkiní railway station =

Railway station in Campeche, Mexico

Calkiní

General information
- Location: Calkiní, Campeche, Mexico
- Coordinates: 20.37775°N 90.06771°W
- Platforms: 2
- Tracks: 3

History
- Opened: December 15, 2023

Services
Preceding station	Tren Maya	Following station
Hecelchakán toward Palenque	Tren Maya	Maxcanú toward Cancún Airport

Calkiní is a train station near Calkiní, Campeche.

== Tren Maya ==
Andrés Manuel López Obrador announced the Tren Maya project in his 2018 presidential campaign. On 13 August 2018, he announced the complete outline. The route of the new Tren Maya put Calkiní station on the route that would connect with San Francisco de Campeche railway station and Teya Mérida railway station.

Calkiní station will serve as a station on Section 3 of the Maya Train, in the state of Campeche.
