= Xtampak =

Mayan archaeological site in Mexico

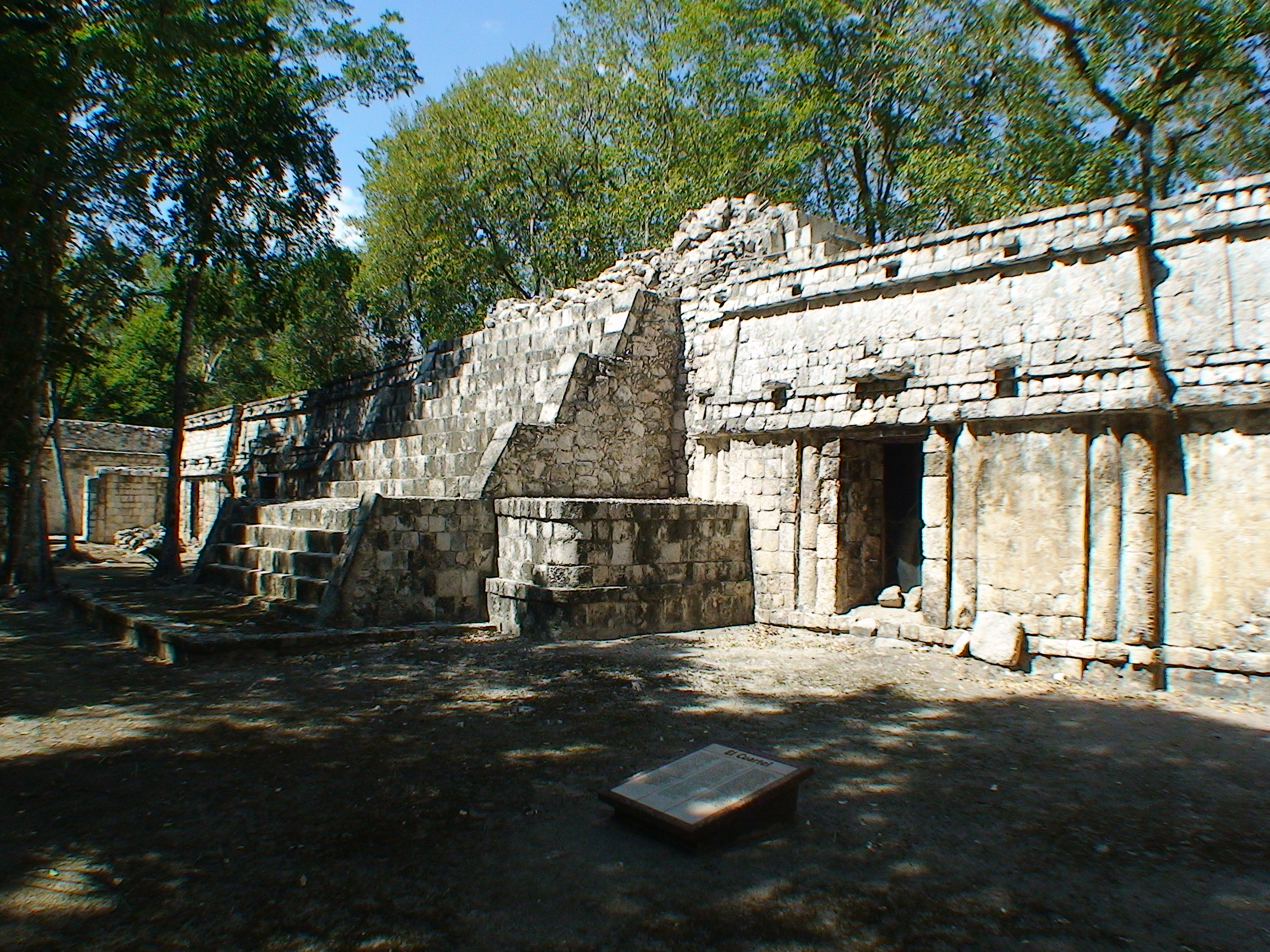

- Location within
- 19.7713°N 89.5981°W
- Periods: Late Preclassic to Terminal Classic
- Cultures: Maya
- Location: Yaxché Akal, Campeche, Mexico
- Region: Campeche

History
- Built: 400 BC
- Abandoned: 1000

Site notes
- Architectural style: Chenes architecture

Xtampak (also known as Santa Rosa Xtampak) is a Maya archaeological site in the Mexican state of Campeche. A major town in the Chenes region, it flourished during the Late Classic era.

== History ==
The name Xtampak comes from a Maya meaning "old / ancient walls". It is a very old site. The cities origins date back to 400 BC. The top of the hill has been aligned and surrounded by falling terraces intended for cultivation. The city grew by 850 years, reaching its peak of development between 550 and 950. It was planned and beautifully decorated, and contributed to this undoubtedly specific location of the city: it lay in a place where interacted Chenes architectural styles and Puuc. Thanks in Santa Rosa Xtampak find magnificent monuments showing the typical features of each of these styles. Xtampak was the historical capital of the Chene Maya people. The city is built on a natural elevation with a flattened and divided summit, it covers an approximate area of 9 square kilometers. Xtampak had over ten interlocked ceremonial plazas. During its golden age, the city was inhabited by 10,000 people. The buildings have a marked Chenes style, although there are some structures with a Puuc influence.

== Monuments ==
The largest structure in Xtampak is Hill Stars, a large platform with stairs. The building is made up of at least ten buildings. This is where archaeologists found eight stele, all smooth and sculpted. Xtampak was one of the few cities built by the Chenes, which erected stelae.

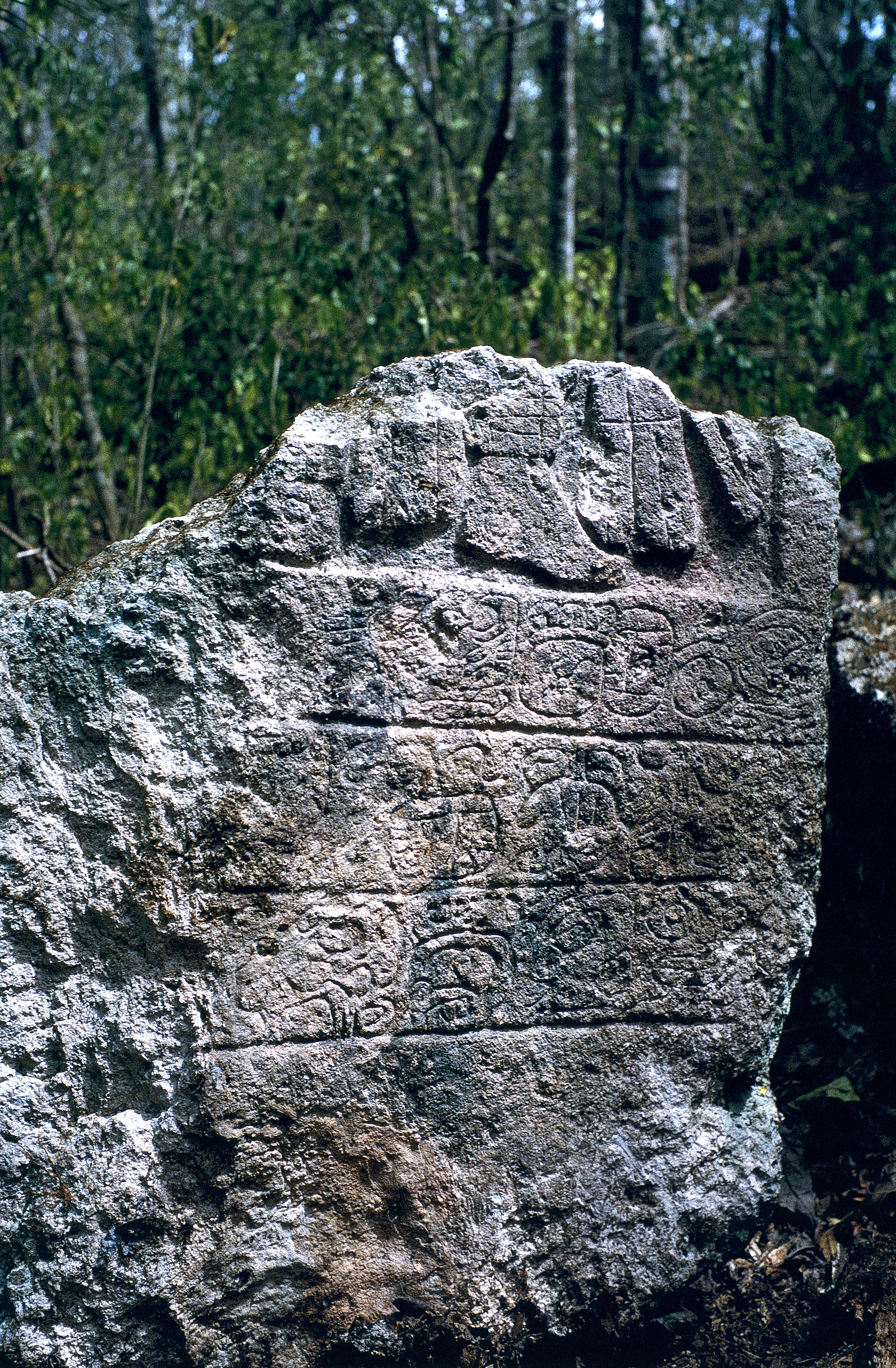
Stele 2

Monument	Maya Date	Gregorian Date
Stele 5	9.10.19.2.3	2 December 651
Stele 7	9.15.19.17.14	3 May 751
Vault capstone 3	9.18.1.0.0	6 October 791
Stele 8	10.0.0.0.0	15 March 830
Vault capstone 1	10.2.1.0.0	12 August 870
Stele 3	10.2.2.0.0	7 August 871
Stele 1	10.3.0.0.0	4 May 889
Stele 6	10.3.0.0.0	4 May 889
Stele 4	10.4.2.0.0	10 January 911
Vault capstone 2	10.6.0.0.0	24 June 948
Stele 2	?	?

== Buildings ==
=== The Palace ===
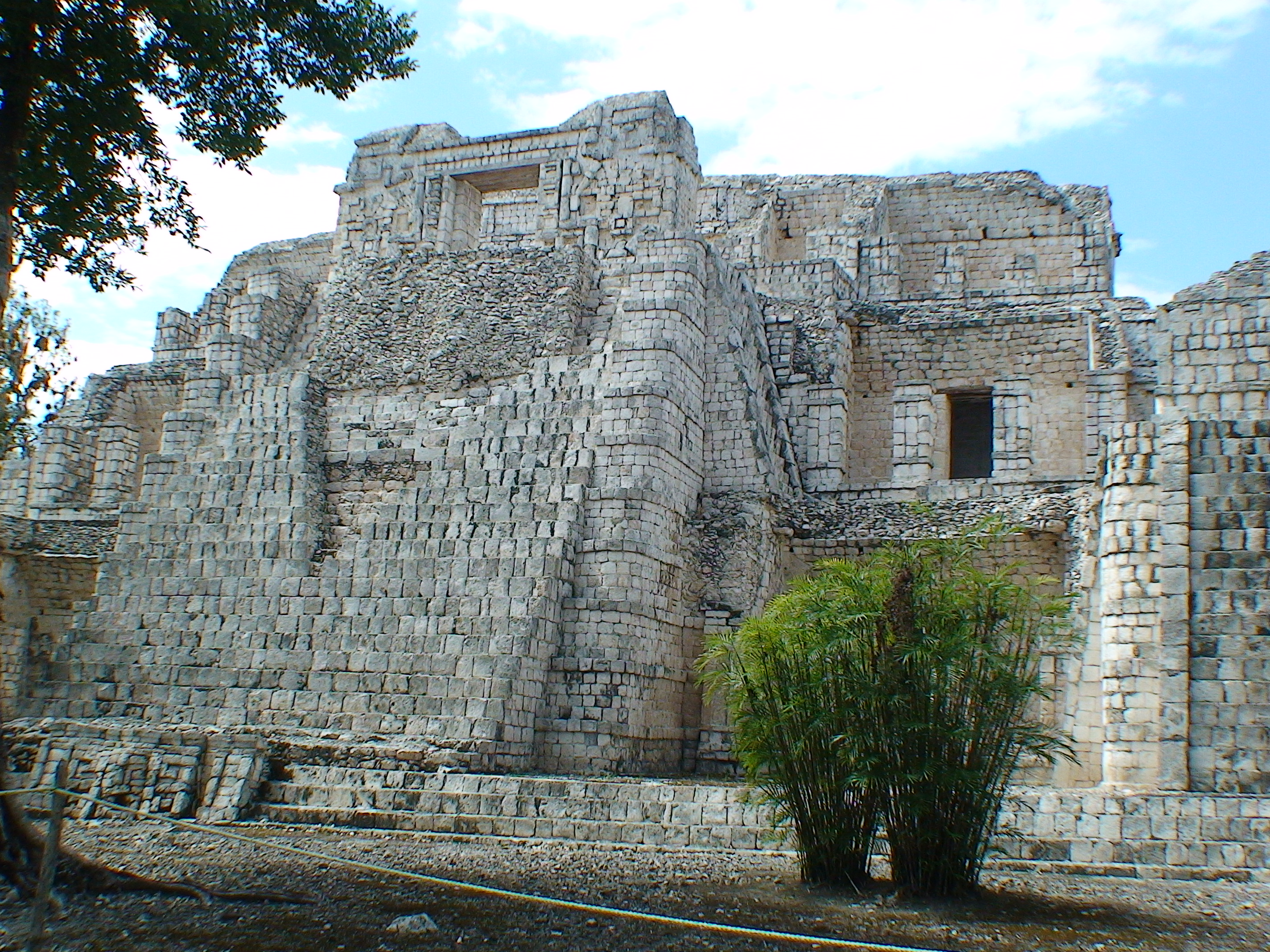
The front of the palace

The large three-story building known as the Palace, is the most unusual structure still standing at Xtampak. There are 27 rooms on the ground level; 12 on the second level, including the two one-room buildings at the southeast and southwest corners; and five on the third level, making a total of 44 rooms. A broad stairway on the east side leads from the plaza level to a doorway in the free-standing wall at the head of the stairs, giving access to the open courtyard and rooms behind. There is no indication that this stairway would allow access to the second level, nor is there any real indication of secondary stairways on the west side leading to the second level.

The interior stairways, starting in Rooms 6 and 10 on the ground floor, wind up through all three levels, providing the only visible means of reaching the second level. At the second and third levels, these stairways open directly to the exterior, in contrast to the ground floor where it is necessary to pass through anterooms before gaining access to the stairways. The organization of the rooms on the ground floor is unusual, as all of the rooms, with the exception of the three central rooms on the west side, consist of "suites" of two, three and four interconnected rooms. Six rooms (Rooms 3, 15, 17, 18, 24, 26) contain beds and all of these are interior rooms.

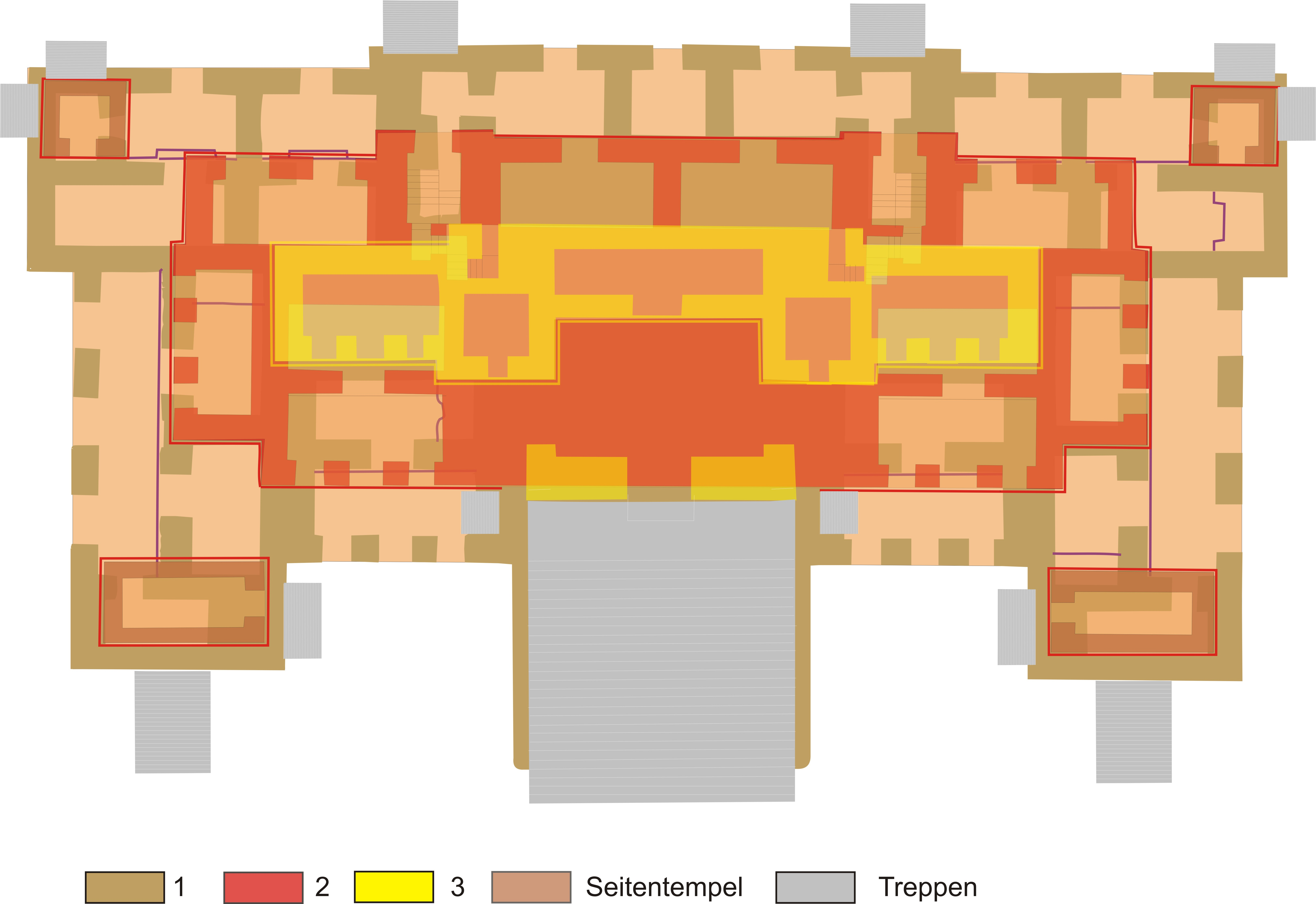
Floor plan of the palace

The four-room suites at the northern and southern ends were singled out for special attention since the outermost gallery-like rooms (Rooms 16 and 25) have sculptured panels centered between the doorways to the rear rooms and there are groups of three inset colonnettes on the west and east sides of these doorways. The central colonnette of both groups is covered with relief carvings. The pier-like doorjambs of the outer rooms, and presumably the central piers as well, show recessed panels and capitals with Puuc-like profiles.

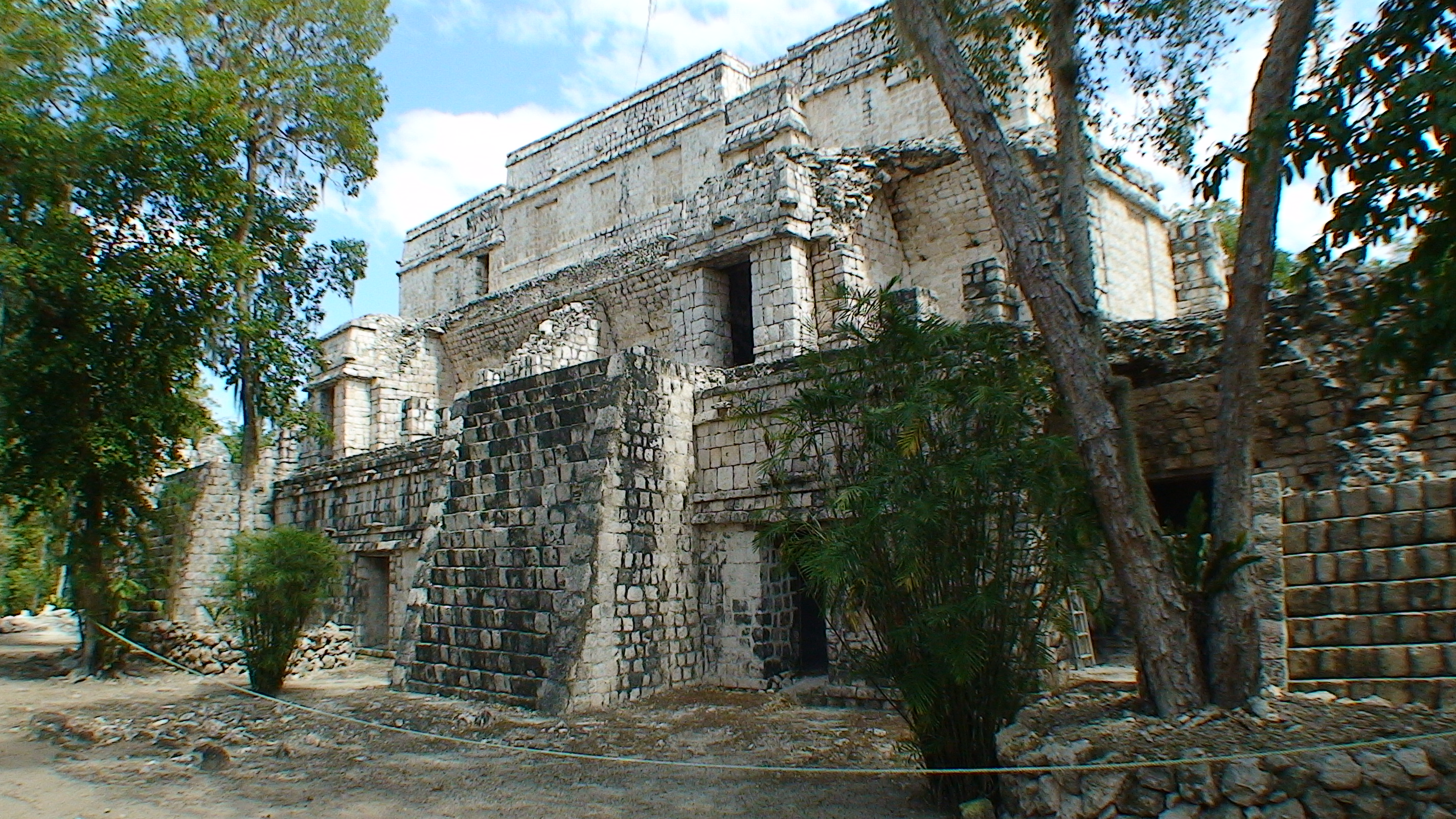
The back of the palace

The rooms on the second level, which are the least accessible, are spacious. Six of the eight rooms have multiple doorways, which is seemingly at odds with the level of privacy afforded by the restricted access system. The free-standing rooms at the southeast and southwest corners seem almost symbolic, since the space in front of the doorways is too narrow to allow entry from the adjacent terraces. The tower-like buildings on the second level, with their ornaments in stucco, might well have carried large zoomorphic masks on their east facades, and that there were non-functional stairways in front, now fallen or covered with debris, creating modified Rio Bee style symbolic pyramid-temples similar to the variant Chenes forms seen at Hochob, Tabasqueno, and Dzibilnocac.

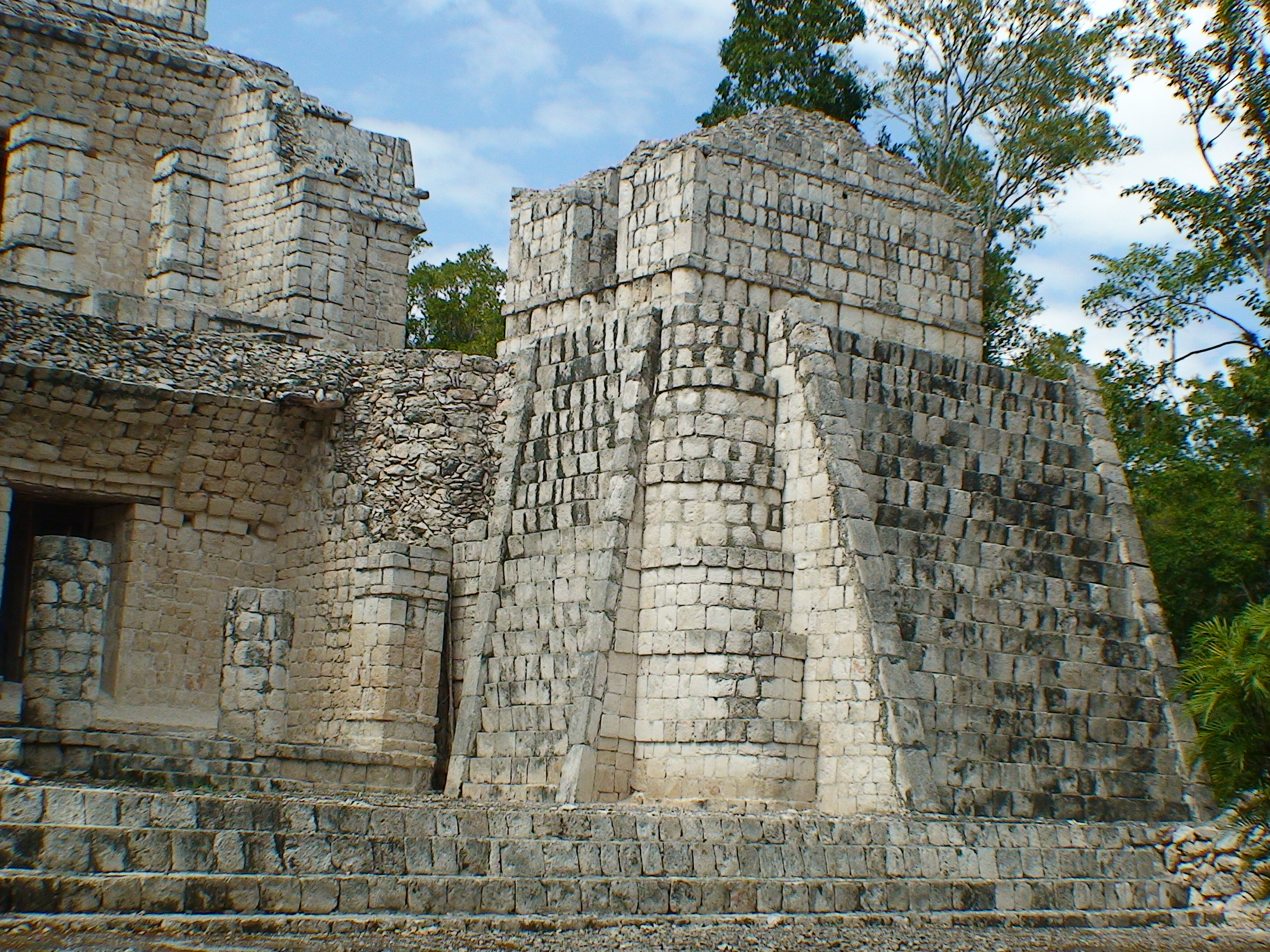

The rooms on the third level, which can be reached by means of both the interior stairways on the west side and the monumental stairway on the east side, seem to represent the ceremonial portion of the building. Both the courtyard and the room behind seem ideally suited for formal rituals involving processionals proceeding up the stairway and into a sacred precinct while the general populace watched from the plaza below. The central portion of the east facade may have been conceived as a symbolic pyramid-temple in which the monumental east stairway with its stepped ramps represent the pyramid, while the free-standing wall on the third level, with its portal surrounded by a gigantic zoomorphic mask, represents the temple. The combined stairway and symbolic temple have the same steep-sided tower-like configuration as seen in typical Rio Bee tower forms.

The monumental stairway on the east side, leading to a portal in a free-standing wall with an open court behind, immediately calls to mind Structure IV at Becan, which shows a very similar organization. The Palace also shows a vague similarity to the three-story Palace at Sayil, although the latter is larger and lacks the open courtyard on the third level at the head of the main stairway.

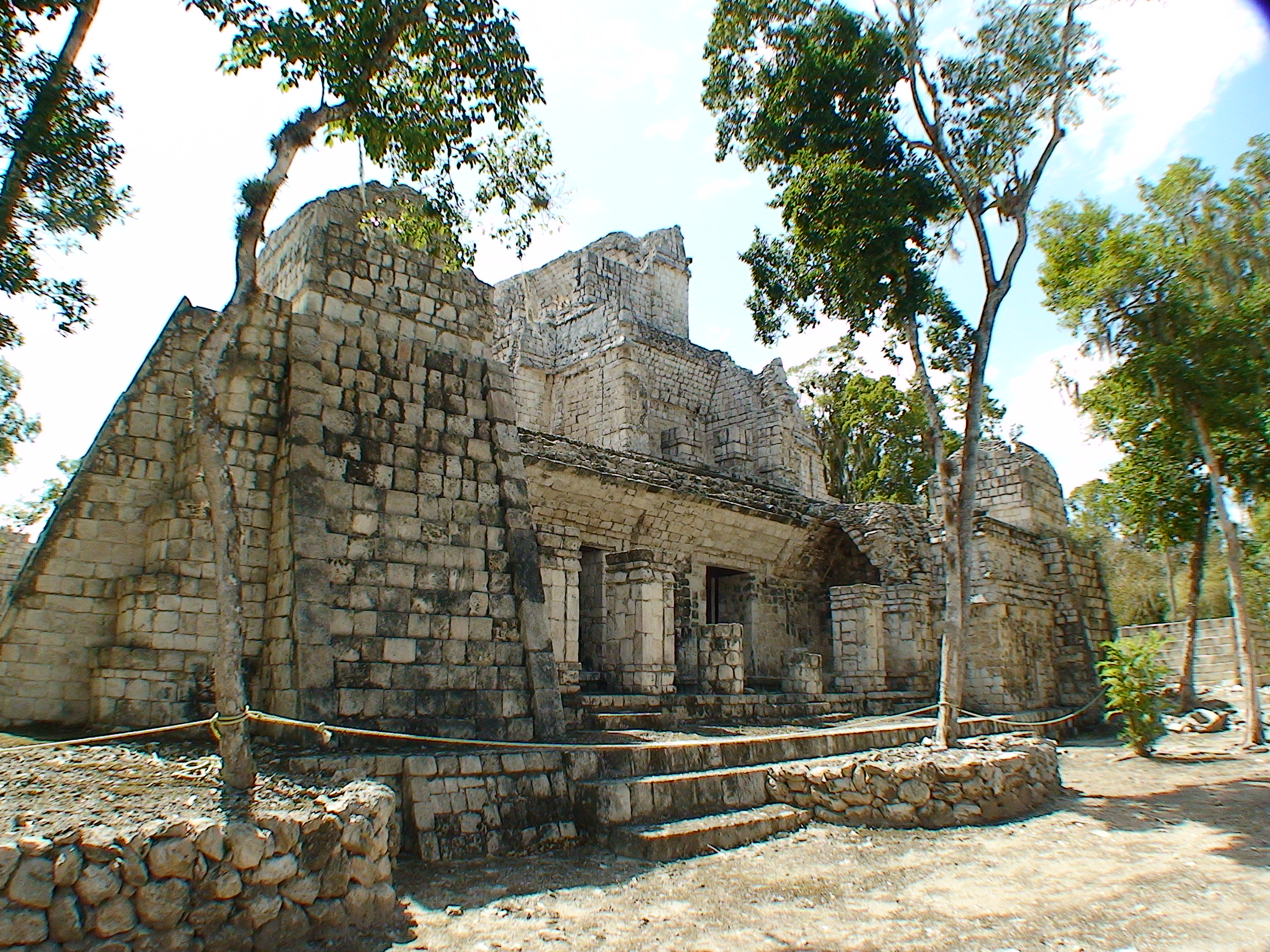

Perhaps the most unusual aspect of the Palace in Xtampak is that it appears to have been conceived at the outset as a multi-story structure, in contrast to multi-level buildings elsewhere in which the various levels were accretions over time. This is particularly noticeable in the Palace at Sayil, where the architectural and decorativefeatures of the facades on the various levels are considerably different. In contrast, the architectural and decorative features on all three levels of the Palace at Santa Rosa are virtually identical and there are only minor variations in the details of base, medial, and cornice moldings. The interior stair system also points to an initial three-story conception as it is difficult to see how these stairways could have been added at a later date. Several architectural features have been incorporated into this building which seem to anticipate certain elements of the classic Puuc architectural styles. These include the column-like piers creating the multiple doorways to several of the exterior rooms on all three levels.

Other unusual architectural features include the numerous recessed wall panels which are particularly prominent on the west side of the rooms on the third level. Because of the palatial appearance of the building, it is tempting to accept this designation out of hand, but there is little to go on in the way of hard data which has any reference to the function(s) of the various rooms.

The circulation system does, however, establish a fairly clear hierarchy in terms of the degree of privacy or difficulty of entry with regard to the rooms on the several levels. The rooms on the second level are the most difficult to reach and access is easily controlled by means of the interior stair system. The rooms on the third level can be reached from either the interior or exterior stairways, but here again, checkpoints are provided at the points of entry. The outermost rooms on the ground level open directly to the plaza level and are therefore the easiest to reach and the least private. The inner rooms are well protected, however, and are suited for more private activities.

None of the above tells us much about the specific functions of the rooms on different levels, but the obvious advantages afforded by the restrictive access system could be put to use in a variety of ways. Nevertheless, it is impossible to imagine the Palace as anything other than an elite residential-ceremonial-administrative structure where the highest-ranking members of the ruling class at Xtampak held sway.

=== The snake mouth portal ===
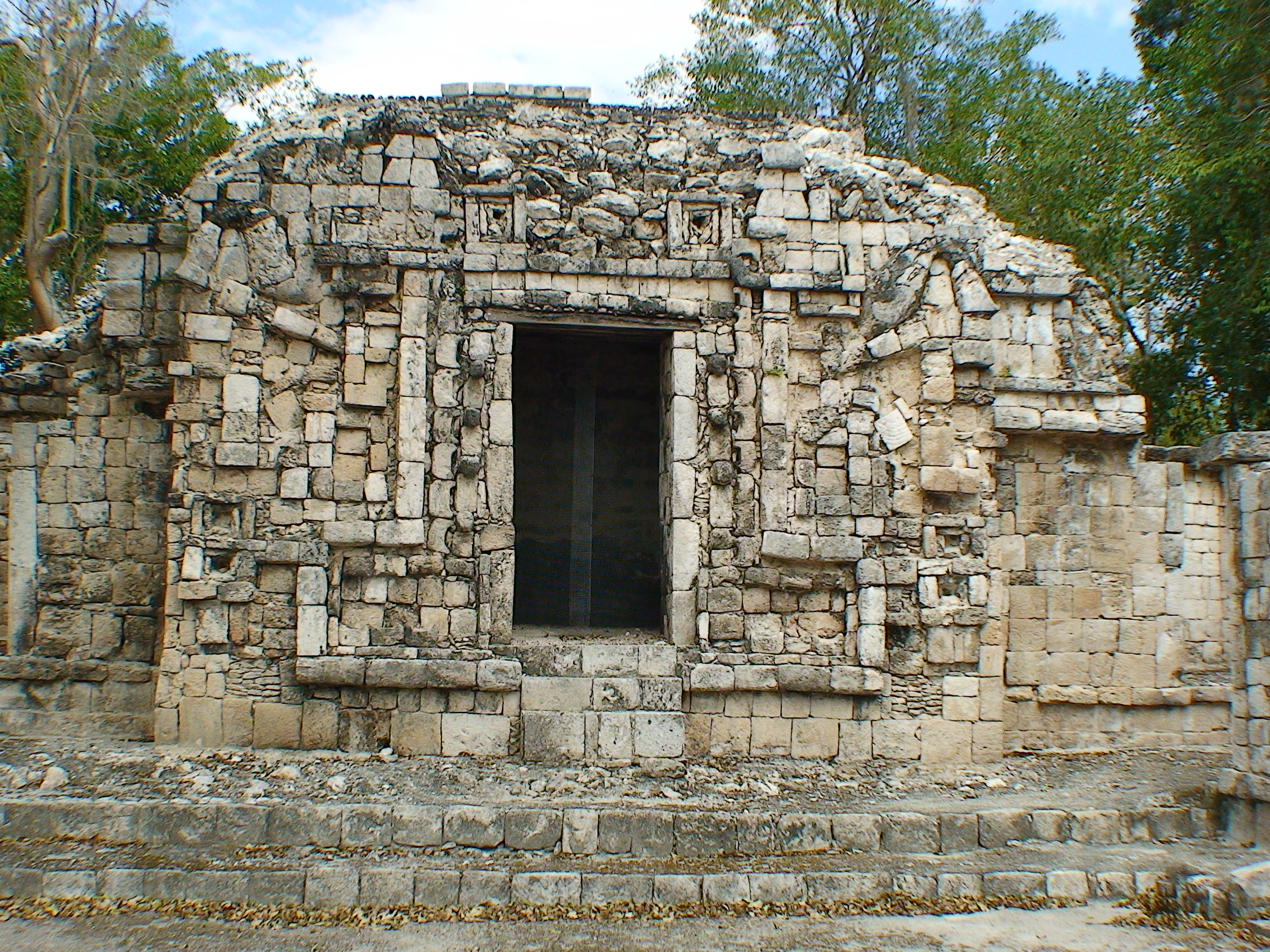
The snake portal

The snake mouth portal decorates the facade of a small room, which is located laterally in a long series of rooms. The space jumps from the series of spaces in front of more than half a meter, and thus creates the typical for the Chenes style impression of individual buildings. The actual entrance is unusually narrow, and is three steps above the ground. The otherwise mostly encountered platform in front of the entrance, which is pushed forward lower jaw is missing here.

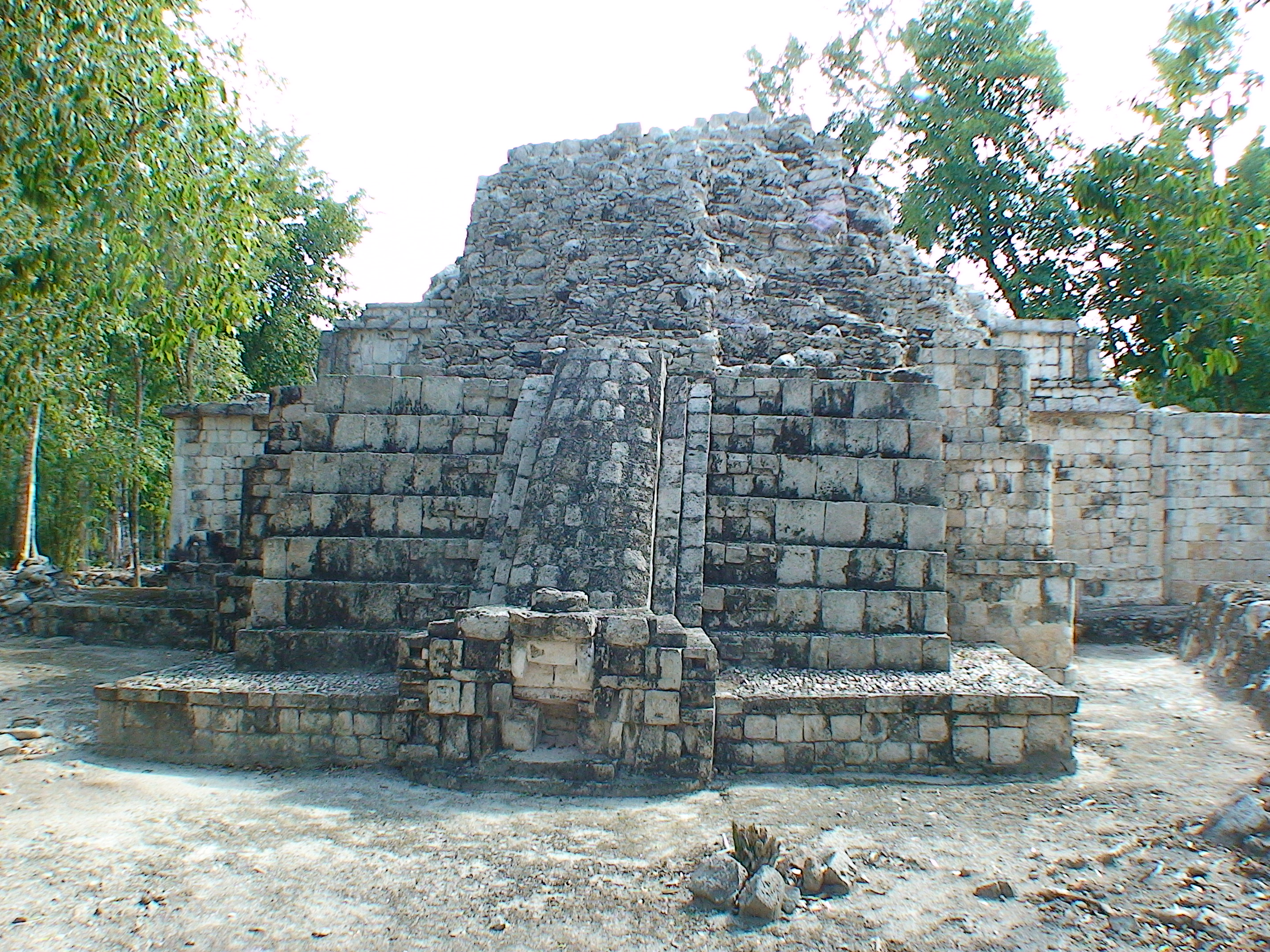
Behind the snake portal

After the completion of the building a staircase was set on the back that leads up to the roof of the room. There, a small room was probably built or at least planned. In order to stabilize the roof for that extra space, the back wall was reinforced to almost half of the vault with a masonry core, which was covered on the front with stucco. From the back of a reconstructed in its lower part staircase leads to the upper room. The staircase has at its center a central stair stringer, which is designed as a tail or abdomen of the reptile, and the turn ends in a small snake throat.
