= Landy Berzunza Novelo =

Mexican politician

- Born: 5 July 1965 (age 61); Campeche, Campeche, Mexico
- Occupation: Politician
- Political party: PRI

Landy Margarita Berzunza Novelo (Note: In this Mexican name, the surname is Berzunza and the second or maternal family name is Novelo.) (born 5 July 1965) is a Mexican politician affiliated with the Institutional Revolutionary Party (PRI). From 2012 to 2015 she served as a deputy during the 62nd Congress representing Campeche.
