= Dzibilnocac =

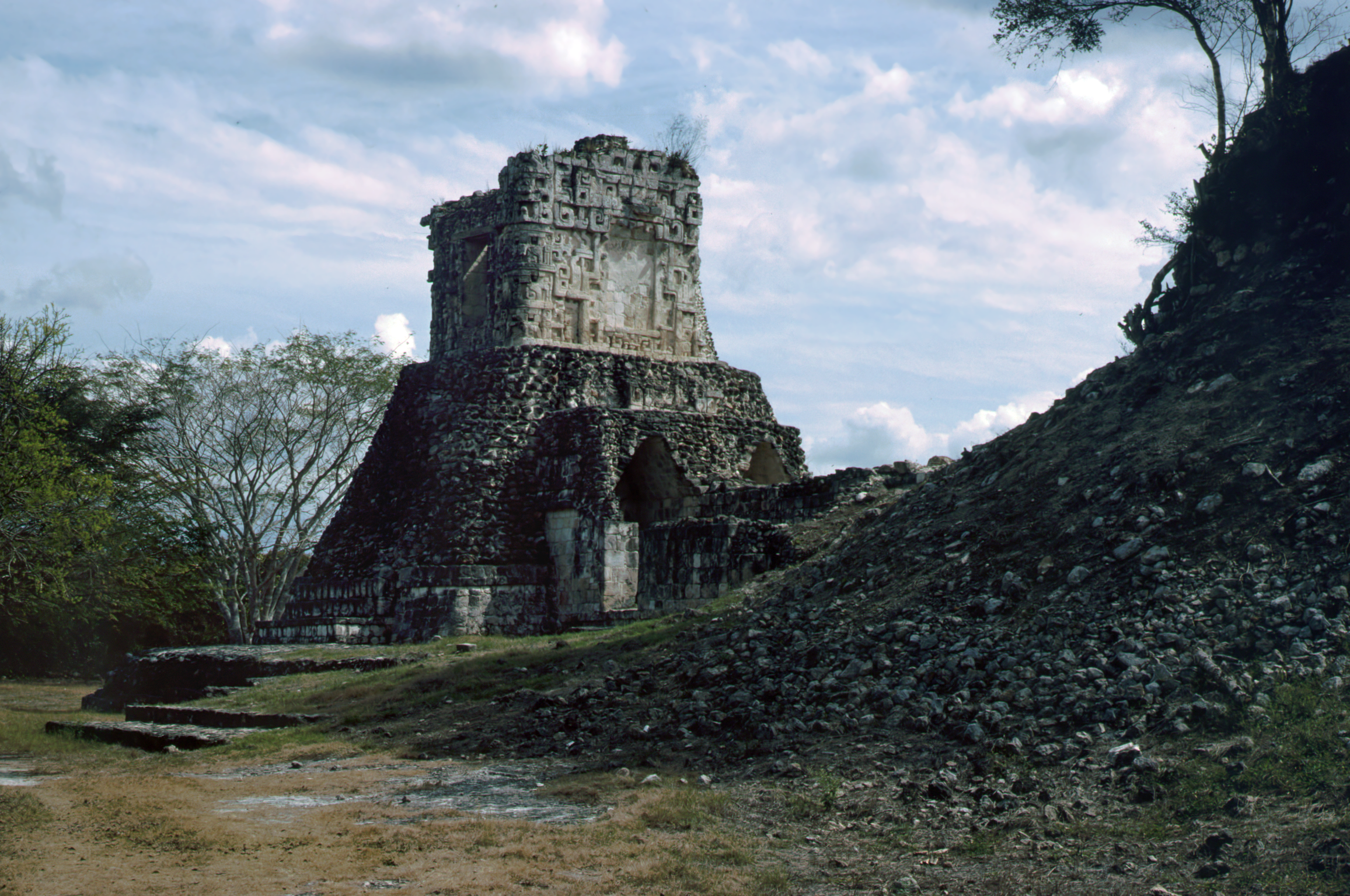
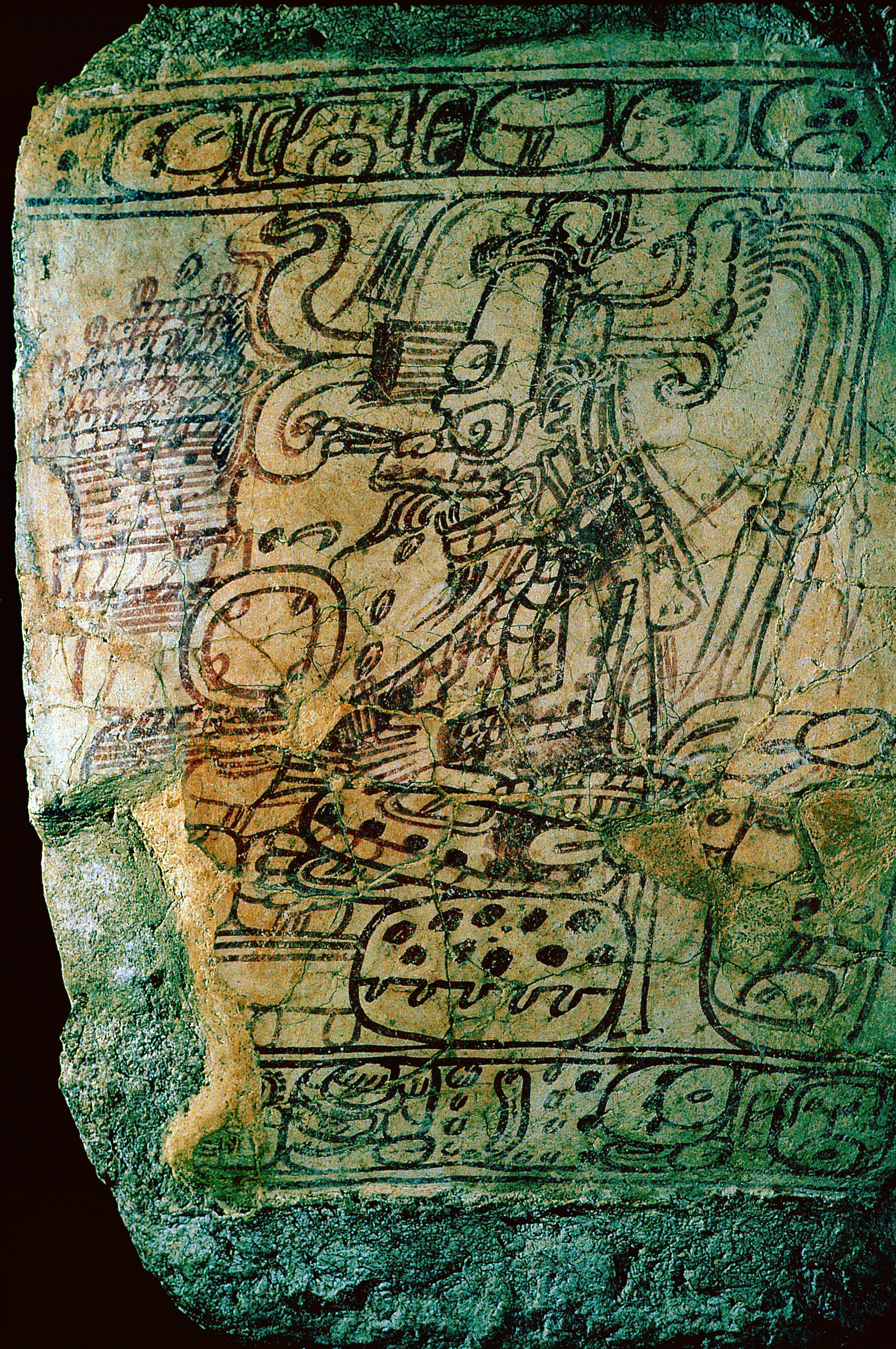
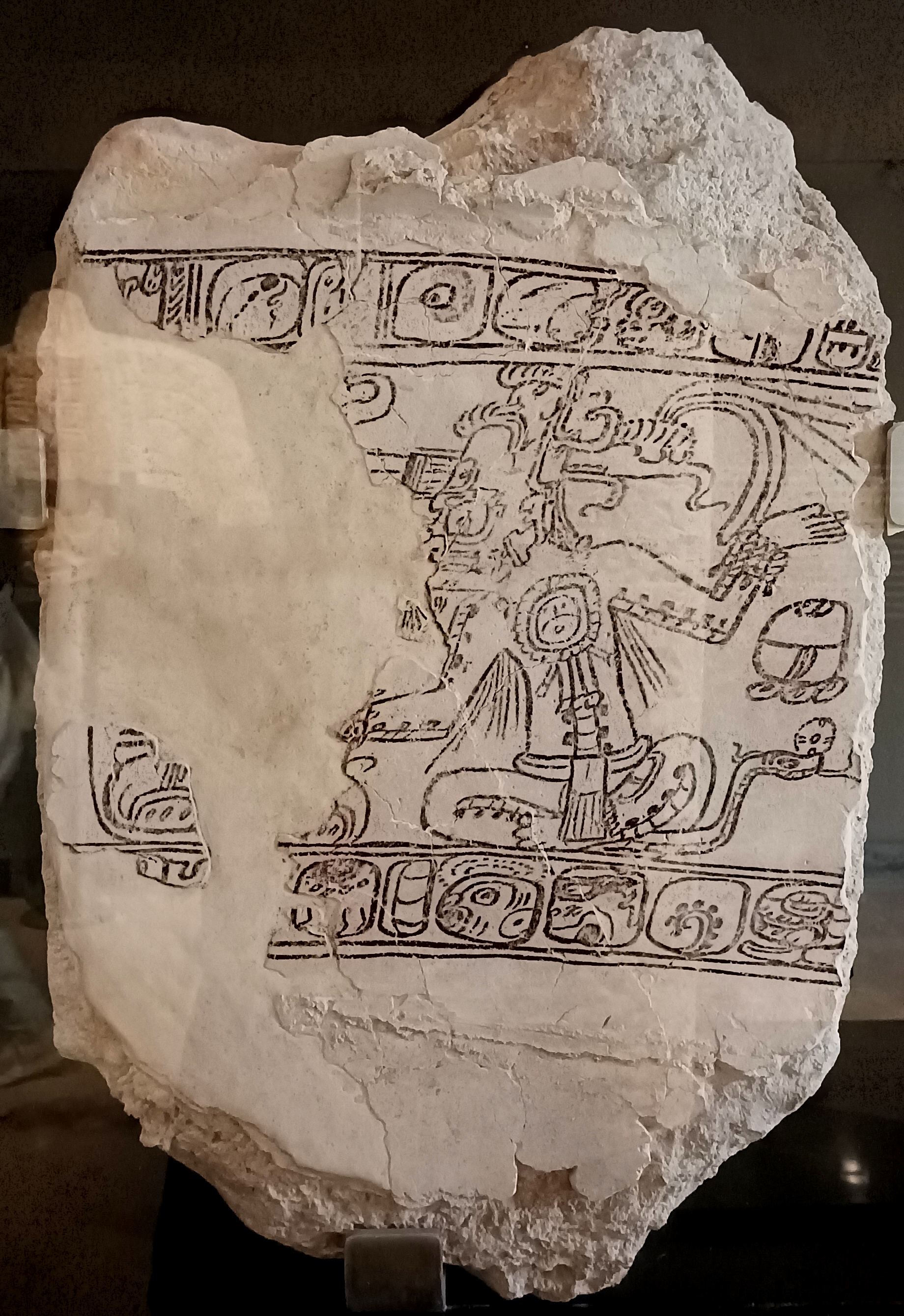
- Palace-Temple of Dzibilnocac and paintings of god K'awiil
- Interactive map of Dzibilnocac
- Periods: Middle Preclassic - Late Classic
- Cultures: Maya civilization
- Location: Mexico
- Region: Chenes

History
- Built: 500 BC - 1000 AD

Site notes
- Architectural style: Chenes
- Discovered: 1842

Dzibilnocac is an archaeological Maya site located in Campeche, Mexico near the community of Vicente Guerrero in the Hopelchén Municipality, in the central part of the Chenes region. The initial occupation of the site dates back to the Middle Preclassic period around 500 BC, but it was until the Late Classic period of the Maya civilization when it reached its greatest development becoming a large Maya city in the Chenes region and an important regional political center with its own emblem glyph and control over a large territory.

The main plaza of the site extends over 1.32 km^{2} with large mounds that still remain buried, pyramids, buildings, rooms and platforms; all of this following a complex urban design. The main structure is a large palatial building in the Chenes architectural style, built on a long platform. The Palace-Temple of Dzibilnocac consists of several chambers and three stepped towers with temples at their top, richly decorated with masks of the rain god Chaac and monumental masks on their facades simulating the open jaws of the Earth Monster or Itzamna, representing a portal to the underworld. Inside the vaulted chambers of this structure were discovered numerous capstones decorated with fine mural paintings with hieroglyphic inscriptions and images of the god K'awiil symbolizing abundance in agriculture and food. The name of Dzibilnocac comes from the Maya language and means Painted Vault as reference to the painted capstones found at the site.

The painted capstones of Dzibilnocac are part of the Maya art of the Chenes region, whose artistic style in mural paintings is similar to the codex style. These represent the image of the god K'awiil sitting on a jaguar skin throne, surrounded by food offerings, carrying baskets of food or scattering cacao or maize seeds as a symbol of abundance. In some of the capstones, hieroglyphic texts delimit the upper and lower parts with inscriptions related to cacao, food (tamal), maize, and water.

== History ==
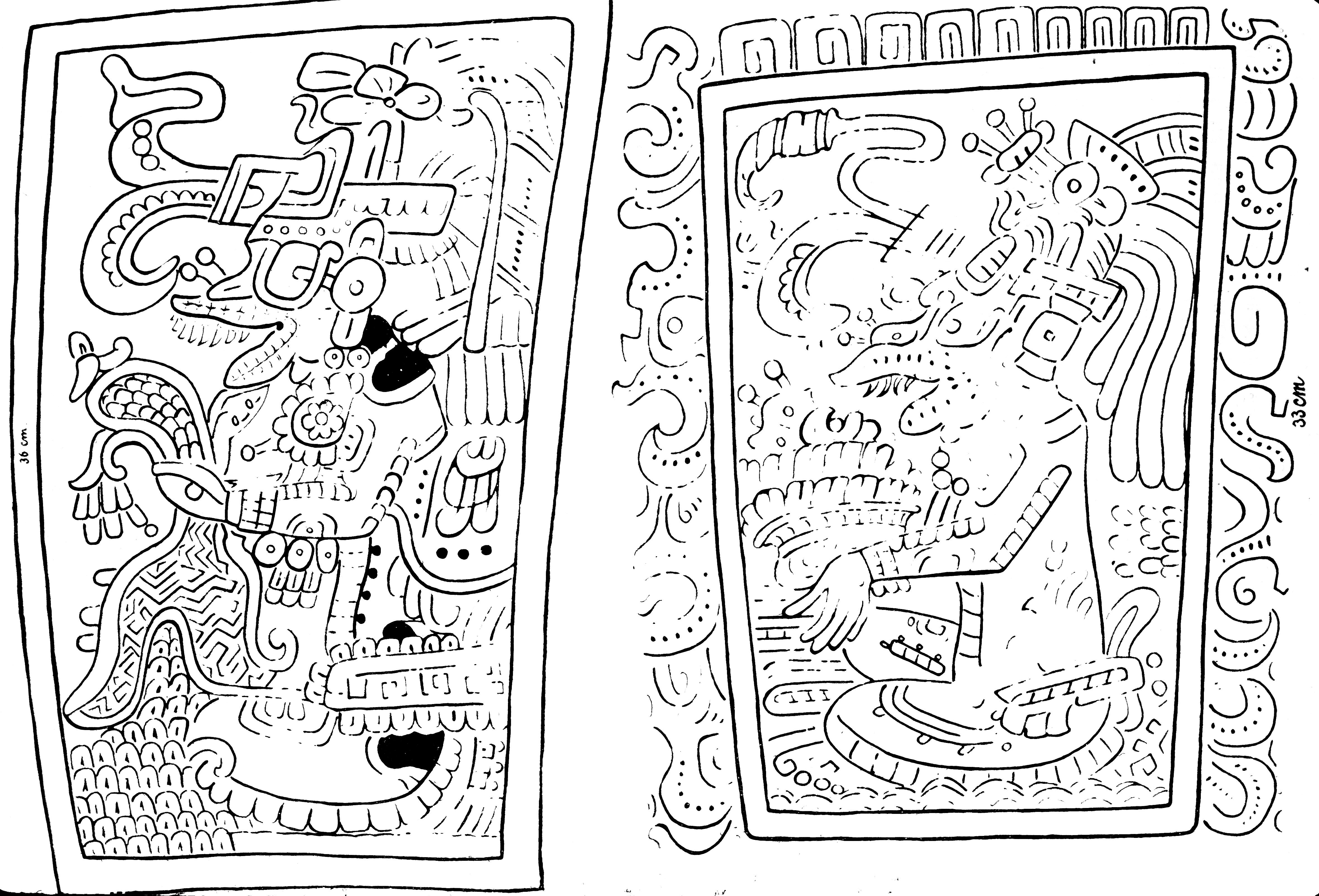
Drawings of some capstones of Dzibilnocac made by Teobert Maler in 1887

The earliest evidence of occupation recorded to date at the site dates back to around 500 BC in the Middle Preclassic period of the Maya civilization. Dzibilnocac was first documented in February 1842 during an expedition by explorers John Lloyd Stephens and Frederick Catherwood, following reports from inhabitants of the nearby town of Iturbide, now called Vicente Guerrero, about the presence of pre-Columbian structures in the site. In 1887 the archaeologist Teoberto Maler arrived at Dzibilnocac for an archaeological exploration in which he took some photographs of the ruins and documented through drawings the paintings on some of the capstones that he found during his expedition.
