= San Francisco de Campeche railway station =

Railway station in Campeche, Mexico

San Francisco de Campeche
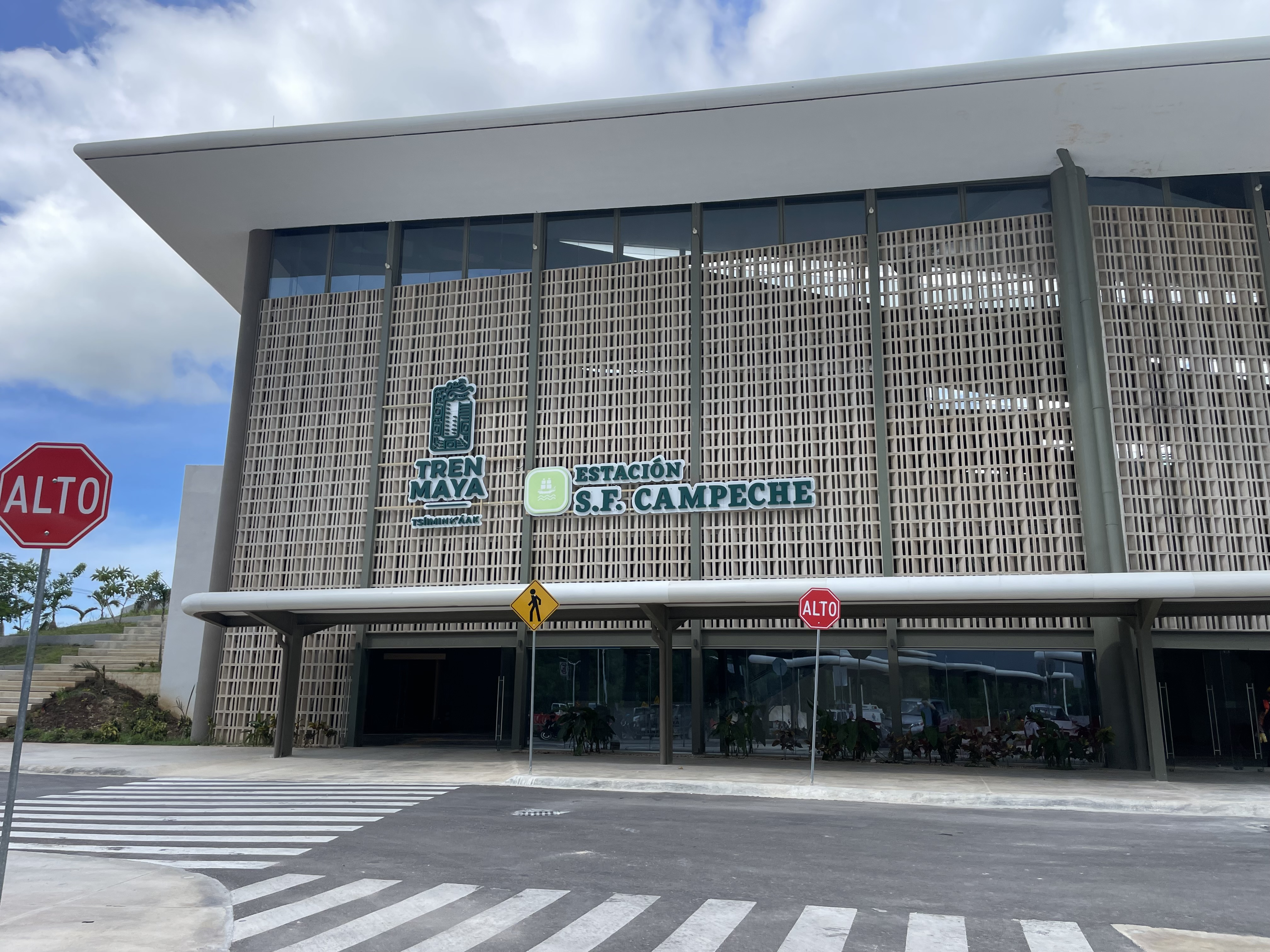

General information
- Location: San Francisco de Campeche, Campeche, Mexico
- Coordinates: 19.82259°N 90.47656°W
- Platforms: 2
- Tracks: 3
- Connections: Campeche Light Train

History
- Opened: December 15, 2023

Services
Preceding station	Tren Maya	Following station
Edzná toward Palenque	Tren Maya	Tenabo toward Cancún Airport
Connecting guided bus service
Terminus	Campeche Light Train	Siglo XXI toward Centro Histórico
Location

San Francisco de Campeche is a railroad station near San Francisco de Campeche, the capital of the Free and Sovereign State of Campeche. The route of the Tren Maya includes a 235 km (146 mi) section extending from Escárcega to Calkiní, and this section includes a station in San Francisco de Campeche.

== History ==
=== Beginning ===
Andrés Manuel López Obrador announced the Tren Maya project in his 2018 presidential campaign. On August 13, 2018, he announced the complete outline. The route of the new Tren Maya put San Francisco de Campeche on the route that would connect with Escárcega, Campeche and Mérida, Yucatán.

=== Construction ===
At first, the station was expected to be built on land owned by the Ferrocarril Transístmico. The station would be close to an older station and would be part of an urban regeneration project for the city. Some time later, the location of the station was changed to be built on the Periférico in Campeche. The railway station officially opened on December 15, 2023.

== See also ==
- Rail transport in Mexico
