= Hecelchakán Municipality =

Municipality in the Mexican state of Campeche

Hecelchakán
- Municipality
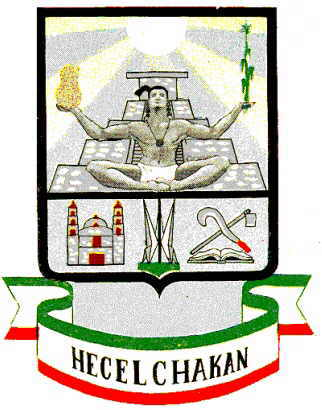
- Coat of arms

- Location of the municipality within Campeche

- Location within Campeche Location within Mexico
- Coordinates: 20°10′0″N 90°8′0″W
- Country: Mexico
- State: Campeche
- Municipal seat: Hecelchakán
- Settled: 1500s

Area
  - Total: 1,294.85 km^{2} (499.94 sq mi)
- Elevation: 10 m (33 ft)

Population (2015)
  - Total: 31,230
  - Density: 24.12/km^{2} (62.47/sq mi)
- Time zone: UTC−6 (CST)
- Website: www.hecelchakan.gob.mx

Hecelchakán (Spanish pronunciation: [xeseltʃaˈkan]) is one of the 13 municipalities in the Mexican state of Campeche. The municipal seat, and largest settlement, is the city of Hecelchakán.

The municipality had a 2005 census population of 28,306, with 10,285 in the municipal seat. The municipality covers an area of 1,331.99 km^{2} (514.284 sq mi) and includes numerous smaller outlying communities, the largest of which is the town of Pomuch.

The name comes from the Yucatec Maya words jeʼelel (rest) and chakʼan (savanna).

== Geography ==
Hecelchakán borders to the north with Calkiní Municipality, to the south with Tenabo Municipality, to the east with Yucatán State and Hopelchén Municipality, and to the west with the Gulf of Mexico, with 24 km of shoreline.

It is at an average altitude of 10 m above sea level.

== Demographics ==
As of 2010, the municipality had a total population of 28,306.

As of 2010, the city of Hecelchakán had a population of 10,285. Other than the city of Hecelchakán, the municipality had 80 localities, the largest of which (with 2010 populations in parentheses) were: Pomuch (8,694), classified as urban, and Pocboc (1,624), Cumpich (1,587), Campo Menonita Yalnón (1,151), and Santa Cruz (1,118), classified as rural.

== History ==
On 7 December 1915, when decree no. 51 approved a new law of interior administration, Hecelchakán became one of the eight free municipalities of the new state of Campeche. That law came into effect on 1 January 1916.
