= Oznerol Pacheco Castro =

Mexican politician (born 1970)

- Born: 7 October 1970 (age 55); Campeche, Campeche, Mexico
- Occupation: Politician
- Political party: PRI

Carlos Oznerol Pacheco Castro (born 7 October 1970) is a Mexican politician from the Institutional Revolutionary Party. From 2009 to 2012 he served as Deputy of the LXI Legislature of the Mexican Congress representing Campeche.
