= Enrique Escalante Arceo =

Mexican politician

- Born: 23 May 1969 (age 56); Campeche, Campeche, Mexico
- Education: Autonomous University of Campeche
- Occupation: Politician
- Political party: PRI

Enrique Ariel Escalante Arceo (born 23 May 1969) is a Mexican politician affiliated with the Institutional Revolutionary Party. He served as Deputy of the LIX Legislature of the Mexican Congress representing Campeche, as well as a local deputy in the LVII Legislature of the Congress of Campeche.
