= Tenabo Municipality =

Municipality in the Mexican state of Campeche

Tenabo
- Municipality
- Coat of arms

- Location within Mexico
- Coordinates: 19°50′N 90°00′W
- Country: Mexico
- State: Campeche
- Municipal seat: Tenabo

Government
  - Municipal president: Julio Cesar Sánchez Caamal (2006–09)

Area
  - Total: 1,058.42 km^{2} (408.66 sq mi)
- Elevation: 10 m (33 ft)

Population (2015)
  - Total: 10,665
  - Density: 10.076/km^{2} (26.098/sq mi)
- municipal seat
- Time zone: UTC−6 (CST)
- Encomienda: 1549
- Municipality created: 1786
- City status: 1960
- Website: www.tenabo.gob.mx

Tenabo (Yucatec Maya: "place where they measure by hand-spans") is one of the 13 municipalities in the Mexican state of Campeche. It is situated on the coast in the north of the state. The municipal seat, and largest settlement, is the city of Tenabo, 36 km from state capital Campeche, Camp. As of 2015, the municipality had a total population of 10,665.

== Geography ==
The municipality of Tenabo borders to the north with Hecelchakán Municipality, to the east with Hopelchén Municipality, to the south with Campeche Municipality, and to the west with the Gulf of Mexico.

It covers 882 km^{2}, accounting for 1.5% of the state's total surface area.

== Demographics ==
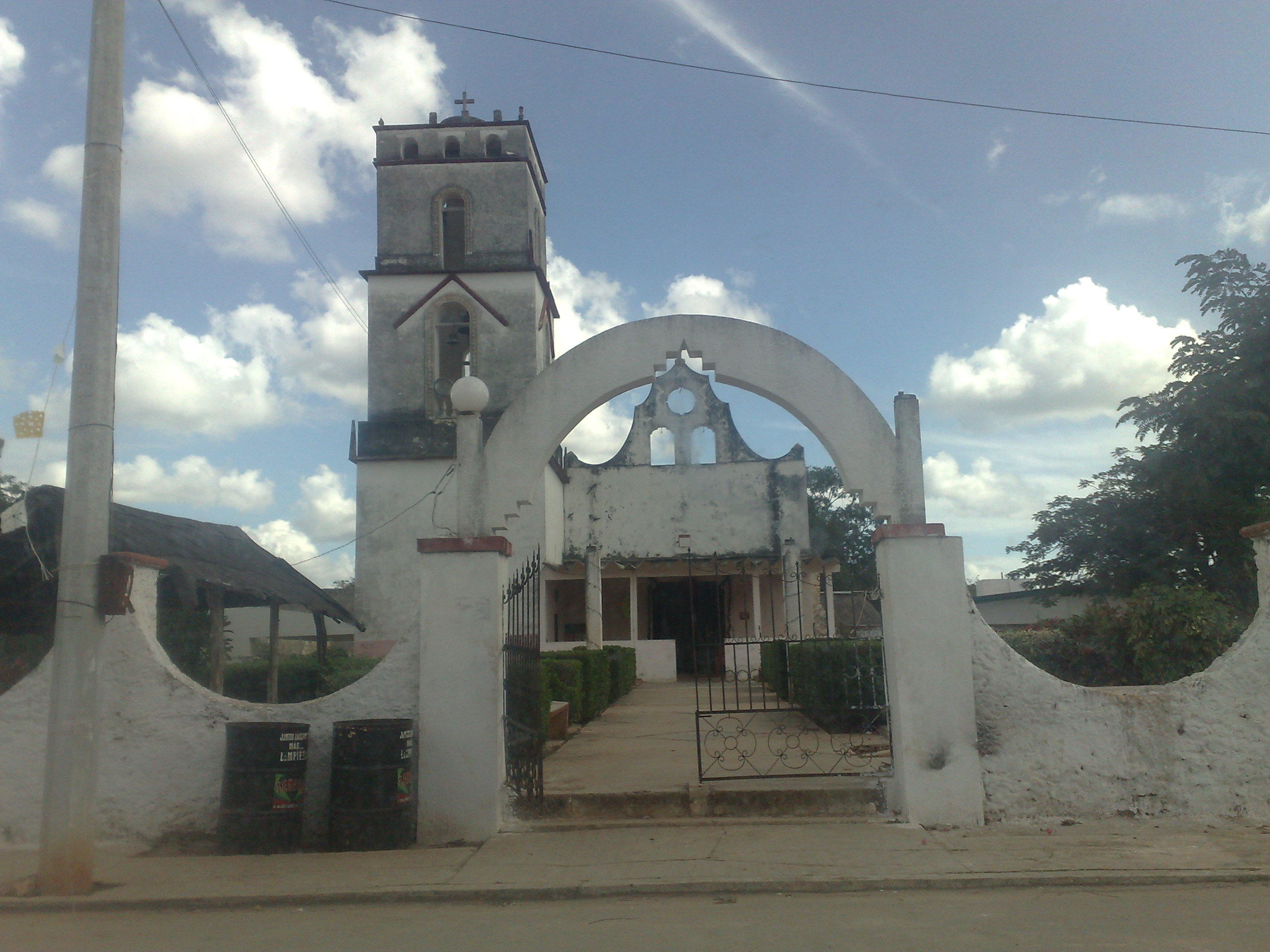
Church at Tinún

As of 2010, the municipality had a total population of 9,736.

As of 2010, the city of Tenabo had a population of 7,543. Other than the city of Tenabo, the municipality had 90 localities, none of which had a population over 1,000.
