= Tenabo =

City in the Mexican state of Campeche

- Coat of arms

- Location within Campeche Location within Mexico
- Coordinates: 20°02′N 90°13′W
- Country: Mexico
- State: Campeche
- Municipality: Tenabo
- Founded: 1450
- Encomienda: 1544
- Elevation: 10 m (33 ft)

Population (2010)
  - Total: 7,543
- Time zone: UTC−6 (Central (US Central))
- Postal code: 24700
- Area code: 996
- Demonym: Tenabeño
- Website: www.tenabo.gob.mx

Tenabo is a city in the Mexican state of Campeche. It is located in the north of the state, 35 km from the state capital Campeche, Camp., and 110 km from Mérida, Yucatán, along Federal Highway 180. It serves as the municipal seat for the municipality of the same name.

As of 2010, the city of Tenabo had a population of 7,543.

== Geography ==
=== Climate ===
Climate data for Tenabo (1951–2010)
| Month | Jan | Feb | Mar | Apr | May | Jun | Jul | Aug | Sep | Oct | Nov | Dec | Year |
|---|---|---|---|---|---|---|---|---|---|---|---|---|---|
| Record high °C (°F) | 38.2 (100.8) | 39.0 (102.2) | 41.9 (107.4) | 44.0 (111.2) | 46.2 (115.2) | 42.5 (108.5) | 39.5 (103.1) | 39.5 (103.1) | 38.5 (101.3) | 37.3 (99.1) | 39.3 (102.7) | 38.8 (101.8) | 46.2 (115.2) |
| Mean daily maximum °C (°F) | 30.3 (86.5) | 32.0 (89.6) | 34.6 (94.3) | 36.9 (98.4) | 36.9 (98.4) | 35.4 (95.7) | 34.5 (94.1) | 34.5 (94.1) | 33.6 (92.5) | 32.4 (90.3) | 31.3 (88.3) | 30.1 (86.2) | 33.5 (92.3) |
| Daily mean °C (°F) | 24.0 (75.2) | 25.0 (77.0) | 27.5 (81.5) | 29.7 (85.5) | 30.0 (86.0) | 29.4 (84.9) | 28.6 (83.5) | 28.6 (83.5) | 28.2 (82.8) | 26.8 (80.2) | 25.2 (77.4) | 23.9 (75.0) | 27.2 (81.0) |
| Mean daily minimum °C (°F) | 17.7 (63.9) | 18.1 (64.6) | 20.5 (68.9) | 22.5 (72.5) | 23.1 (73.6) | 23.5 (74.3) | 22.8 (73.0) | 22.7 (72.9) | 22.8 (73.0) | 21.1 (70.0) | 19.1 (66.4) | 17.7 (63.9) | 21.0 (69.8) |
| Record low °C (°F) | 9.5 (49.1) | 8.5 (47.3) | 8.5 (47.3) | 10.5 (50.9) | 16.1 (61.0) | 15.6 (60.1) | 19.0 (66.2) | 19.1 (66.4) | 19.1 (66.4) | 10.5 (50.9) | 10.0 (50.0) | 8.3 (46.9) | 8.3 (46.9) |
| Average precipitation mm (inches) | 21.7 (0.85) | 8.9 (0.35) | 13.4 (0.53) | 20.7 (0.81) | 88.3 (3.48) | 161.0 (6.34) | 145.0 (5.71) | 174.6 (6.87) | 219.9 (8.66) | 102.9 (4.05) | 41.5 (1.63) | 29.4 (1.16) | 1,027.3 (40.44) |
| Average precipitation days (≥ 0.1 mm) | 2.7 | 1.2 | 1.1 | 1.4 | 4.7 | 9.9 | 11.5 | 11.8 | 12.8 | 8.0 | 3.5 | 2.1 | 70.7 |
Source: Servicio Meteorológico National
