= List of radio stations in Tabasco =

This is a list of radio stations in the state of Tabasco, Mexico.

Radio stations in Tabasco
| Call sign | Frequency | Location | Owner | Name | Format |
|---|---|---|---|---|---|
| XEGMSR-AM | 620 AM | Villahermosa | Grupo Multimedios Sin Reservas, S.A. de C.V. | 620 AM, La Radio Que Se Ve | News/talk |
| XEKV-AM (Note: Combo with XHKV-FM 88.5) | 740 AM | Villahermosa | Radio Cañón, S.A. de C.V. | W Radio | News/talk |
| XECSCI-AM | 790 AM | Buena Vista Segunda Sección | Álvaro Hernández Hernández | —N/a | —N/a |
| XETQE-AM | 1120 AM | Tenosique | Government of the State of Tabasco | La Radio de Tabasco | Public radio |
| XETVH-AM | 1230 AM | Cunduacán | Government of the State of Tabasco | La Radio de Tabasco | Public radio |
| XHSCEG-FM | 88.1 FM | Buena Vista Primera Sección | Yokotanop, A.C. | Yokot'anop Radio | Community radio |
| XHKV-FM | 88.5 FM | Villahermosa | Radio Cañón, S.A. de C.V. | W Radio | News/talk |
| XHZX-FM | 89.3 FM | Tenosique | XEZX Voz del Usumacinta, S.A. de C.V. | ZX Radio | |
| XHQQQ-FM | 89.3 FM | Villahermosa | Triple Q Radio, S.A. de C.V. | La Ke Buena | Regional Mexican |
| XHVX-FM | 89.7 FM | Comalcalco | Diana Patricia Chamelis Ruiz | La Grande de Tabasco | |
| XHSAT-FM | 90.1 FM | Villahermosa | Radio XHSAT, S. de R.L. de C.V. | La Q | Adult contemporary |
| XHUTU-FM | 90.5 FM | Emiliano Zapata | Universidad Tecnológica del Usumacinta | XHUTU 90.5 FM | University |
| XHVET-FM | 90.5 FM | Villa La Venta | Government of the State of Tabasco | La Radio de Tabasco | Public radio |
| XHJAP-FM | 90.9 FM | Villahermosa | Grupo Cantón Radio, S.A. de C.V. | Tabasco Hoy Radio | Regional Mexican |
| XHVA-FM | 91.7 FM | Villahermosa | Radio Tabasco, S.A. | XEVA | News/talk |
| XHTR-FM | 92.5 FM | Villahermosa | Radiodifusora XHTR-FM, S.A. de C.V. | La Poderosa | Regional Mexican |
| XHZQ-FM | 93.7 FM | Cunduacan | María de Los Ángeles Espinosa de Los Monteros de la Cruz, Oscar and Carlos Zerecero Espinosa de Los Monteros | Radio Futurama | |
| XHHGR-FM | 94.1 FM | Villahermosa | Transmisora Regional Radio Fórmula, S.A. de C.V. | Radio Fórmula | News/talk |
| XHPJON-FM | 94.3 FM | Jonuta | FM Comunicación Efectiva, S.A.P.I. de C.V. | Radio Río | Regional Mexican |
| XHTVH-FM | 94.9 FM | Villahermosa | Government of the State of Tabasco | Mega FM | Public radio, youth |
| XHTAB-FM | 95.7 FM | Villahermosa | La Voz de Tabasco, S.A. de C.V. | Ya! FM | Contemporary hit radio |
| XHCPEK-FM (Note: Was XHUJAT-FM 107.3 until January 18, 2023.) | 96.1 FM | Villahermosa | Universidad Juárez Autónoma de Tabasco | Radio UJAT | University |
| XHOP-FM | 96.5 FM | Villahermosa | Radio XHOP Villahermosa, S. de R.L. de C.V. | Radio Cañon | Romantic |
| XHVB-FM | 97.3 FM | Villahermosa | Súper Stéreo de Tabasco, S.A. de C.V. | Extremo FM | Regional Mexican |
| XHSCGL-FM | 97.9 FM | Jalapa | Shal Apan Rivera de Arena Jalapa, A.C. | Choquita Stereo | Community radio |
| XHLI-FM | 98.3 FM | Villahermosa | Estéreo Sistema, S.A. | Radio Mexicana | Regional Mexican |
| XHCPBS-FM | 98.7 FM | Nacajuca | Instituto Nacional de los Pueblos Indígenas | La Voz de los Chontales | Indigenous |
| XHVHT-FM | 99.1 FM | Miguel Hidalgo Primera Sección | Radiodifusora XEVHT-AM, S.A. de C.V. | La Rancherita | Regional Mexican |
| XHRTM-FM | 99.5 FM | Macuspana | Radio y Televisión de Calidad, S.A. de C.V. | La Z | Regional Mexican |
| XHEMZ-FM | 99.9 FM | Emiliano Zapata | Nora María Cantón Martínez de Escobar | Oye 99.9 | Contemporary hit radio |
| XHJON-FM | 100.7 FM | Jonuta y Macuspana | Government of the State of Tabasco | La Radio de Tabasco | Public radio |
| XHPECV-FM | 100.9 FM | Comalcalco | Nelin Rodríguez Pérez | Estéreo Vida | Religious |
| XHEPAR-FM | 101.5 FM | Villahermosa | Radio Promotora de Tabasco, S.A. de C.V. | Los 40 | Contemporary hit radio |
| XHUTT-FM | 102.5 FM | Villahermosa | Universidad Tecnológica de Tabasco | Sintonía UTTAB | University |
| XHSCBI-FM | 102.9 FM | Centro (Villahermosa) | Kahal Sembradores de Futuro, A.C. | Radio Grijalva | Community radio |
| XHTQE-FM | 102.9 FM | Tenosique | Government of the State of Tabasco | Mega FM | Public radio, youth |
| XHVILL-FM | 103.3 FM | Villahermosa | Radio XEVILL, S.A. de C.V. | | |
| XHVT-FM | 104.1 FM | Villahermosa | Jasz Radio, S.A. de C.V. | XEVT | News/talk |
| XHREC-FM | 104.9 FM | Miguel Hidalgo Primera Sección | Radiodifusora XEREC-AM, S.A. de C.V. | Oreja FM | Variety Hits |
| XHRVI-FM | 106.3 FM | Ixtacomitán | Radiodifusoras Capital, S.A. de C.V. | Titán FM | Regional Mexican |
| XHSIBI-FM | 107.9 FM | Ejido Ignacio Allende | Comunidad Indígena Ejido Ignacio Allende | —N/a | Indigenous |

== Defunct stations ==
- XENAC-AM 1440, Nacajuca
- XHACM-FM 104.5, Cárdenas
