= 104.1 FM =

FM radio frequency

The following radio stations broadcast on FM frequency 104.1 MHz:

== Argentina ==
- Cóndor in Laguna Paiva, Santa Fe
- Frecuencia Mutual in Rosario, Santa Fe
- LRM417 in Venado Tuerto, Santa Fe
- LRM947 in Calchaqui, Santa Fe
- Radio María in Mercedes, Corrientes
- Radio Valle Viejo in San Isidro, Catamarca

== Australia ==
- 104.1 Territory FM in Darwin, Northern Territory
- 2CHY in Coffs Harbour, New South Wales
- 2DAY in Sydney, New South Wales
- ABC Classic in Mount Gambier, South Australia
- ABC Classic in Wodonga, Victoria
- Radio TAB in Charleville, Queensland
- Triple J in Mount Isa, Queensland
- Triple J in Woomera, South Australia
- 6PNN in Karratha, Western Australia

== Canada (Channel 281) ==
- CBGA-14-FM in Grande-Vallee, Quebec
- CBYO-FM in Barriere, British Columbia
- CFOI-FM in Quebec City, Quebec
- CFQX-FM in Selkirk, Manitoba
- CFZY-FM in Stockholm, Saskatchewan
- CFZZ-FM in St-Jean-sur-Richelieu, Quebec
- CHAD-FM in Dawson Creek, British Columbia
- CHRT-FM in Trail, British Columbia
- CHYK-FM in Timmins, Ontario
- CICZ-FM in Midland, Ontario
- CIFA-FM in Yarmouth, Nova Scotia
- CIOT-FM in Nipawin, Saskatchewan
- CIRA-FM-4 in Rimouski, Quebec
- CIRN-FM in Saskatoon, Saskatchewan
- CITU-FM in Petit-de-Grat, Nova Scotia
- CJCJ-FM in Woodstock, New Brunswick
- CKBF-FM in Suffield, Alberta
- CKFF-FM in Kipawa, Quebec
- CKNA-FM in Natashquan, Quebec
- CKTF-FM in Gatineau, Quebec
- VF2221 in Valemount, British Columbia
- VF2452 in Voisey Bay, Newfoundland and Labrador
- VF2526 in Nakusp, British Columbia

== Cayman Islands ==
- ZFKH-FM at Grand Cayman

== China ==
- CNR Business Radio in Qingdao
- Radio Guangdong Pearl River Radio in Doumen District

== Ireland ==
- Shannonside FM in counties Longford and Roscommon

== Jamaica ==
- BBC World Service

== Malaysia ==
- Best FM in Johor Bahru and Singapore
- Pahang FM in Eastern Pahang and Klang Valley
- Perak FM in Northern Perak

== Mexico ==
- XEDF-FM in Mexico City
- XHADA-FM in Ensenada, Baja California
- XHBA-FM in Mexicali, Baja California
- XHCCG-FM in Monclova, Coahuila
- XHCDH-FM in Ciudad Cuauhtémoc, Chihuahua
- XHECQ-FM in Culiacán, Sinaloa
- XHGR-FM in Xalapa, Veracruz
- XHMD-FM in León, Guanajuato
- XHPEP-FM in Teposcolula, Oaxaca
- XHRPV-FM in Ciudad Victoria, Tamaulipas
- XHSJR-FM in San Juan del Río, Querétaro
- XHTEN-FM in Tepic, Nayarit
- XHUACS-FM in Saltillo, Coahuila
- XHVT-FM in Villahermosa, Tabasco

== Philippines ==
- DXIV in Iligan City
- DYKO in Kalibo, Aklan (now vacant/defunct formerly as Star FM)
- DZVM in Urdaneta, Pangasinan
- DXAT in Valencia, Bukidnon
- Radyo Dansalan in Marawi City

== United Kingdom ==
- BBC Radio Shropshire in Clun
- BBC Radio Sheffield in South Yorkshire
- BBC Radio Stoke in Stafford
- BBC Radio Berkshire in Basingstoke
- BBC Radio Cumbria in Keswick
- BBC Radio 4 in Dumbarton
- BBC Radio Cymru in Cwmavon, Torfaen
- BBC Radio nan Gàidheal in Edinburgh

== United States (Channel 281) ==
- KAFE in Bellingham, Washington
- KANT (FM) in Guernsey, Wyoming
- KBEJ-LP in Beaumont, Texas
- KBFM in Edinburg, Texas
- KBOT in Pelican Rapids, Minnesota
- KBOX in Lompoc, California
- KBRI in Clarendon, Arkansas
- KBRJ in Anchorage, Alaska
- KBVC in Buena Vista, Colorado
- KCDY in Carlsbad, New Mexico
- KCGK in Lutesville, Missouri
- KCGL in Powell, Wyoming
- KCKB in Moran, Texas
- KCNF-LP in Macon, Missouri
- KCUN-LP in Livingston, Texas
- KEJC-LP in Dallas, Texas
- KENA-FM in Hatfield, Arkansas
- KFIS in Scappoose, Oregon
- KFLT-FM in Tucson, Arizona
- KFMU-FM in Oak Creek, Colorado
- KFRR in Woodlake, California
- KGGF in Fredonia, Kansas
- KHCI-LP in Moberly, Missouri
- KHKK in Modesto, California
- KIBZ in Crete, Nebraska
- KIHW-LP in West Helena, Arkansas
- KIQK in Rapid City, South Dakota
- KJLO-FM in Monroe, Louisiana
- KJOR in Windsor, California
- KJPZ in East Helena, Montana
- KKLM in Murrieta, California
- KKUS in Tyler, Texas
- KLCJ in Oak Grove, Louisiana
- KLEJ-LP in Fort Worth, Texas
- KLXN in Rosepine, Louisiana
- KMGL in Oklahoma City, Oklahoma
- KMOX in Hazelwood, Missouri
- KMSN in Mason, Texas
- KNAB-FM in Burlington, Colorado
- KOEZ in Ames, Iowa
- KORR in American Falls, Idaho
- KOWO-LP in Wimberley, Texas
- KPOC-FM in Pocahontas, Arkansas
- KPPQ-LP in Ventura, California
- KQFA-LP in Lafayette, Louisiana
- KRBE in Houston, Texas
- KRDS in Silverton, Colorado
- KRWJ-LP in Rockwall, Texas
- KSAF-LP in Minot, North Dakota
- KSAH-FM in Pearsall, Texas
- KSDM in International Falls, Minnesota
- KSGF in Ash Grove, Missouri
- KTCG in Sanger, Texas
- KTEG in Santa Fe, New Mexico
- KUEZ in Fallon, Nevada
- KVDU in Houma, Louisiana
- KWOW in Clifton, Texas
- KWPK in Sisters, Oregon
- KXDD in Yakima, Washington
- KYRE-LP in Mansfield, Texas
- KZGP-LP in Grand Prairie, Texas
- KZJK in Saint Louis Park, Minnesota
- KZTW in Tioga, North Dakota
- KZYN in Toquerville, Utah
- W281BE in Fort Mill, South Carolina
- WAEB in Allentown, Pennsylvania
- WALR-FM in Palmetto, Georgia
- WBWN in Le Roy, Illinois
- WCKQ in Campbellsville, Kentucky
- WCLE-FM in Calhoun, Tennessee
- WCXL in Kill Devil Hills, North Carolina
- WCYI-LP in Bloomington, Indiana
- WDLT-FM in Saraland, Alabama
- WDYO-LP in Nashville, Tennessee
- WEPV-LP in Hampton, Virginia
- WERR in Vega Alta, Puerto Rico
- WGLF in Tallahassee, Florida
- WGVC-LP in Gainesville, Florida
- WHRZ-LP in Spartanburg, South Carolina
- WHTT in Buffalo, New York
- WIKY-FM in Evansville, Indiana
- WIOF-LP in Woodstock, New York
- WJFY-LP in Newark, Ohio
- WJNN-LP in Fallsburg, New York
- WKGV in Swansboro, North Carolina
- WLBC in Muncie, Indiana
- WMJA-LP in Loudon, Tennessee
- WMNV in Rupert, Vermont
- WMQZ in Colchester, Illinois
- WMRQ in Waterbury, Connecticut
- WNAX in Yankton, South Dakota
- WNCC in Franklin, North Carolina
- WNHC-LP in Lima, Ohio
- WNNK in Harrisburg, Pennsylvania
- WOGY in Jackson, Tennessee
- WOVE-LP in Forest City, North Carolina
- WPRS in Waldorf, Maryland
- WPXZ in Punxsutawney, Pennsylvania
- WPYK in Portsmouth, Ohio
- WQAL in Cleveland, Ohio
- WQOU-LP in Mt. Gilead, Ohio
- WRBX in Reidsville, Georgia
- WRJY in Brunswick, Georgia
- WRLU in Algoma, Wisconsin
- WSAG in Linwood, Michigan
- WTKS in Cocoa Beach, Florida
- WTQR in Winston-Salem, North Carolina
- WUCZ in Carthage, Tennessee
- WVGR in Grand Rapids, Michigan
- WVIW in Bridgeport, West Virginia
- WVXS in Romney, West Virginia
- WWBX in Boston, Massachusetts
- WWUS in Big Pine Key, Florida
- WWYL in Chenango Bridge, New York
- WXRW-LP in Milwaukee, Wisconsin
- WXVM in Merrill, Wisconsin
- WYAV in Myrtle Beach, South Carolina
- WYDX-LP in Frankfort, Kentucky
- WZEE in Madison, Wisconsin
- WZIG-LP in Palm Harbor, Florida
- WZKS in Union, Mississippi
