= XHKV-FM =

Radio station in Villahermosa, Tabasco, Mexico

XHKV-FM/XEKV-AM
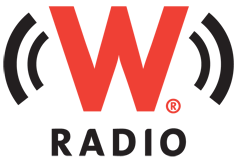
- Villahermosa, Tabasco; Mexico
- Frequencies: 88.5 MHz, 740 kHz
- Branding: W Radio

Programming
- Format: News/talk
- Affiliations: Radiópolis

Ownership
- Owner: Radio Cañón; (Radio Cañón, S.A. de C.V.)
- Sister stations: XHSAT-FM XHOP-FM

History
- First air date: March 20, 1971; 1994 (FM)

Technical information
- Power: AM: 10 kW day/1 kW night
- ERP: FM: 2.747 kW
- Transmitter coordinates: 17°59′15.5″N 92°54′41.7″W

Links
- Webcast: Listen live
- Website: radiocanon.com.mx

XHKV-FM 88.5/XEKV-AM 740 is a combo radio station in Villahermosa, Tabasco, Mexico. The station carries the W Radio news/talk format from Radiópolis. XEKV and XHKV are broadcast from a transmitter facility in Col. Las Gaviotas, on Villahermosa's east side.

== History ==
Logo as Exa FM, used from 2017 to 2023

The concession for 740 AM was awarded in March 1971 to Enrique Lodoza Gómez. In 1994, the FM station was added. The station then known as "Stereo Vida" carrying a Spanish contemporary format until the launch of Exa FM pop format in Villahermosa, effective 2002.

In 2012, XEKV/XHKV was sold to Radio Dinámica del Sureste, which was primarily owned by México Radio, S.A. de C.V., the radio subsidiary of Organización Editorial Mexicana (OEM).

In 2021, NTR acquired the ABC Radio group from OEM. The station continued to broadcast the Exa FM pop format from MVS Radio until April 16, 2023, when NTR's four Exa FM stations left the network. On April 24, 2023, as part of a national alliance between the company and Radiópolis, 22 NTR-owned stations adopted franchise formats from Radiópolis. With Ke Buena, Vox and Los 40 already represented in Villahermosa, XHKV–XEKV joined the W Radio news/talk network. W Radio had previously been in Villahermosa on XEREC-AM 940 and XHVHT-FM 99.1/XEVHT-AM 1270 on Radiorama.
