= Channel 34 =

Channel 34 refers to several television stations:

== Canada ==
The following television stations broadcast on digital or analog channel 34 (UHF frequencies covering 590-596 MHz) in Canada:

- CFGS-DT in Gatineau, Quebec
- CFKM-DT in Trois-Rivières, Quebec
- CFTV-DT in Leamington, Ontario
- CIHF-TV-8 in New Glasgow, Nova Scotia

The following television stations operate on virtual channel 34 in Canada:

- CFGS-DT in Gatineau, Quebec
- CFTV-DT in Leamington, Ontario

== Mexico ==
One regional television network uses virtual channel 34 in Mexico:

- Mexiquense Televisión in the State of Mexico and Mexico City area

== Vietnam ==
One regional television network uses virtual channel 34 in Vietnam:

- LA34 in Long An province.

== See also ==
- Channel 34 TV stations in Mexico
- Channel 34 digital TV stations in the United States
- Channel 34 virtual TV stations in the United States
- Channel 34 low-power TV stations in the United States
