= WPFF =

- Sturgeon Bay, Wisconsin; United States
- Broadcast area: Green Bay, Wisconsin
- Frequency: 90.5 MHz

Programming
- Format: Contemporary Christian
- Network: K-Love

Ownership
- Owner: Educational Media Foundation

History
- First air date: 1991
- Call sign meaning: Praise, Family, and Fellowship

Technical information
- Licensing authority: FCC
- Facility ID: 20612
- Class: C1
- ERP: 100,000 watts
- HAAT: 195 meters
- Transmitter coordinates: 44°54′14″N 87°22′13″W
- Translator: see table

Links
- Public license information: Public file; LMS

WPFF FM 90.5 is an American radio station broadcasting a contemporary Christian format. Licensed to Sturgeon Bay, Wisconsin, United States, the station serves the Green Bay area, transmitting 5 miles (8.0 km) north of Sturgeon Bay from a transmitter at the corner of County Trunk Highway HH and Whitefish Bay Road. The station is owned by Educational Media Foundation and features the standard K-Love schedule.

== History ==
WPFF was founded by Mark Schwarzbauer and operated through Family Educational Broadcasting with a broadcast largely provided by CCM. This format remained in place until just before his retirement in 2008. WPFF was sold to Bethesda Christian Broadcasting in December 2007. On October 23, 2013, it was announced that WPFF, WNLI and their associated translators would be sold to Educational Media Foundation, owners of the K-Love and Air1 Christian music networks. In mid-January 2014, the station announced that, with the sale to EMF closing, it would switch to K-Love, with sister station WNLI carrying Air1. The sale, at a price of $825,000, was completed on February 14, 2014. WNLI has since been sold to Suring, Wisconsin-based WRVM and now operates as a rebroadcaster of WRVM with calls WPVM.

On January 8, 2020, WPCK (104.9), a former commercial station licensed to Denmark that was recently acquired by EMF from Cumulus Media, began to also carry K-Love, with both stations used to cover most of the market rather than being split among K-LOVE or Air1.

== Translators ==
In addition to the main station, WPFF is relayed by a translator network serving northeastern Wisconsin and the Upper Peninsula of Michigan.

Call sign	Frequency	City of license	FID	ERP (W)	Class	FCC info
W291CM	106.1 FM	Appleton, Wisconsin	155872	13	D	LMS
W298BW	107.5 FM	Iron Mountain, Michigan	20613	10	D	LMS
W271AC	102.1 FM	Appleton, Wisconsin	20616	38	D	LMS
