= Televisión Tabasqueña =

Public TV network of the Mexican state of Tabasco

Coordinates: 17°58′07″N 92°56′01.6″W

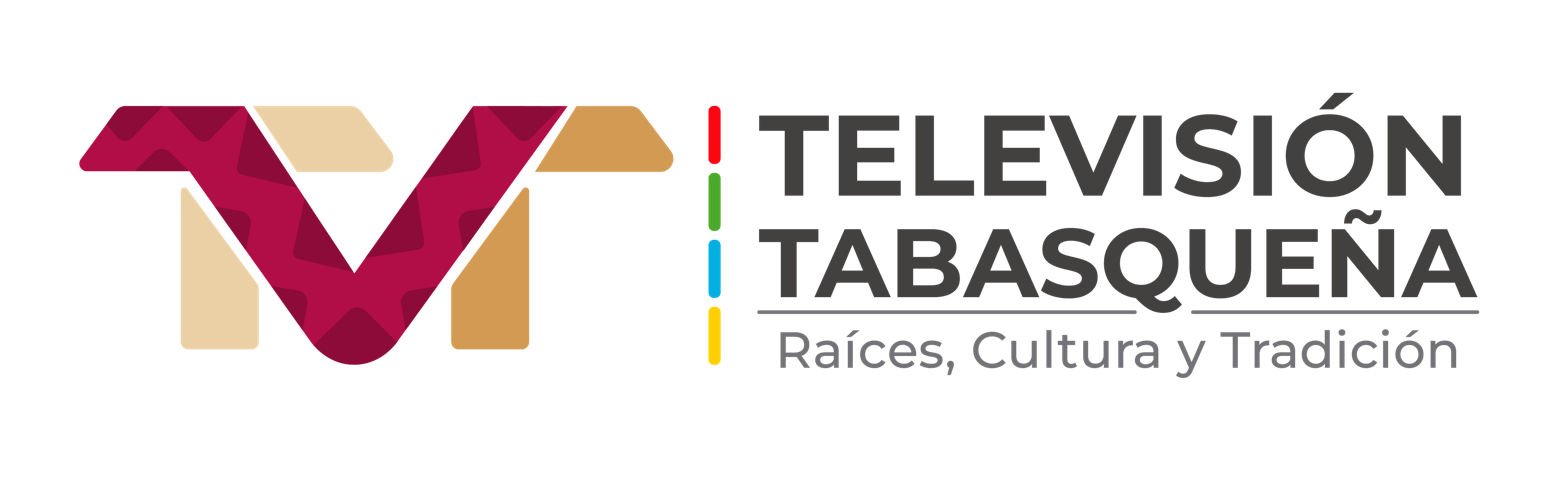
- Type: Mexican broadcast state network
- Founded: October 30, 1997 (with current concession)
- TV transmitters: see below
- Headquarters: Villahermosa
- Broadcast area: Tabasco
- Owner: Televisión Tabasqueña, S.A. de C.V. (Comisión de Radio y Televisión de Tabasco)
- Key people: Héctor Damián Pérez Ruiz, Director General
- Digital channel: 46-1
- IZZI: 46
- Callsigns: XHSTA-TDT, XHTET-TDT, XHVET-TDT
- Official website: tvtenlinea.mx

Televisión Tabasqueña (TVT) is a state-owned public television network serving the Mexican state of Tabasco on three broadcast transmitters. The network is operated by CORAT, the Tabasco Radio and Television Commission, along with La Radio de Tabasco and Mega 94.9. TVT programming primarily consists of cultural and educational content.

TVT's studios are currently located in the Tabasco Convention Center, but will be moved to allow for the center's renovation.

== History ==
In 1983, the state government of Enrique González Pedrero created CORAT, and the state government received permits for noncommercial television stations, as well as AM and FM networks.

In October 1997, Televisión Tabasqueña, S.A. de C.V., a company owned 99.93 percent by the state of Tabasco with the remainder owned by Juan Manuel Cervantes Martínez, received commercial television station concessions for stations at Villahermosa (XHSTA-TV channel 7), La Venta (XHVET-TV channel 5) and Tenosique (XHTET-TV channel 10). TVT was one of three state networks (along with Telemax in Sonora and XHST-TDT in Yucatán) where part or all of the network had commercial concessions, not noncommercial permits.

In 2015, TVT migrated to digital television. In December 2015, the IFT allowed Televisión Tabasqueña to convert its concessions from commercial to public as part of renewing them.

In March 2018, in order to facilitate the repacking of TV services out of the 600 MHz band (channels 38–51), XHSTA was assigned channel 34 for continued digital operations. The other two transmitters are already on channel 34.

== Transmitters ==
RF	VC	Call sign	Location	ERP
34	46	XHVET-TDT	La Venta	82.2 kW
34	46	XHMET-TDT	Tenosique	75.8 kW
46	46	XHSTA-TDT	Villahermosa	74.3 kW
