= Edmundo Cetina Velázquez =

Mexican philosopher

Don Edmundo Cetina Velázquez (1896–1959) was a Mexican physician and philosopher.

== Early life and education ==
Edmundo Cetina Velázquez, nicknamed Don Mundo (short for Edmundo), was born in 1896 in Tenosique, Tabasco, Mexico. He was the son of Joaquín Cetina Moreno and María de Jesús Velázquez, descendants of early founders of Mérida, Yucatán. He was raised in San Juan Bautista de Tabasco, where he attended the Manuel Romero Rubio elementary school before enrolling at the Instituto Juárez.

== Career ==
Cetina Velázquez began his career as an accountant before training as a physician. He become known for his assertive diagnoses and the development of his own medical remedies. He later pursued philosophy as a self-taught scholar. He received a civic award from the Tabasco governor Manuel Bartlett Bautista for his scientific investigations.

He wrote several essays throughout his career, including several around the theory of relativity. Among his works include the Algunos balbuceos sobre una filosofía de la vida (Some Babblings on a Philosophy of Life) and Algunos aspectos de la Relatividad (Some Aspects of Relativity).

== Death ==
Cetina Velázquez died in 1956.
