= WSCG (TV) =

Television station in Baxley, Georgia

- Baxley–Savannah, Georgia; Beaufort–Hilton Head, South Carolina; United States
- City: Baxley, Georgia
- Channels: Digital: 35 (UHF); Virtual: 34

Programming
- Affiliations: 34.1: TCT; for others, see § Subchannels

Ownership
- Owner: Total Christian Television; (Radiant Life Ministries, Inc.)

History
- Founded: November 1, 1991
- First air date: May 1, 1992
- Former call signs: WUBI (1992–1998); WGSA (1998–2018)
- Former channel number: Analog: 34 (UHF, 1992–2009)
- Former affiliations: Independent (1992–1995, 2016–2018); The WB (1995–1997); UPN (1997–2006); The CW (2006–2016); Heroes & Icons (2016–2020)
- Call sign meaning: We're in South Carolina and Georgia

Technical information
- Licensing authority: FCC
- Facility ID: 69446
- ERP: 1,000 kW
- HAAT: 349 m (1,145 ft)
- Transmitter coordinates: 32°2′46.2″N 81°20′26.2″W
- Translator(s): see § Translators

Links
- Public license information: Public file; LMS
- Website: www.tct.tv

WSCG (channel 34) is a religious television station licensed to Baxley, Georgia, United States, serving the Savannah area. The station is owned by Total Christian Television (TCT). WSCG's studios are located on Sams Point Road in Beaufort, South Carolina, and its transmitter is located on Fort Argyle Road/SR 204 in unincorporated western Chatham County, Georgia. It is one of a few TCT stations to maintain its own studio facilities as others ended their local operations in 2018.

== History ==
The station signed on as WUBI on May 1, 1992, and aired an analog signal on UHF channel 34. It was an independent station at first but joined The WB in 1995 and became known as "WB 34". The station switched to UPN in early 1997 as "UPN 13" (using the station's cable channel for branding) after ABC affiliate WJCL (channel 22) originally carried UPN as a secondary affiliation. From 1997 to 1998, The WB's programming was only seen on cable and satellite providers in the Baxley and Savannah areas via the national feed of Chicago-based superstation WGN-TV. From 1998 onwards, WGN was displaced on those providers by a cable-only WB-affiliated station using the fictional call letters "WBVH" (known on-air as "WB 15") as a member of The WB 100+ Station Group.

During the analog era, WGSA's transmitter was located on the western fringe of the Savannah market and was too far away to provide most of the area with a good signal. As a result, it was seen in Savannah itself on Class A repeater WGSA-CA. That repeater was originally W34BO and was assigned in mid-November 1992 on channel 34 but the frequency proved problematic. It became WUBI-LP on channel 38 in late-April 1996 but there were still reception problems. It became WGSA-LP on channel 50 in mid-September 1998 with a further upgrade to Class A (-CA) status in August 2001. The WGSA-CA license was canceled by the Federal Communications Commission (FCC) on February 3, 2015, due to the station having been silent since May 2, 2012.

In January 2006, it was announced that The WB and UPN would end operations in September 2006 to form The CW, a combination of the best programs from both networks. It was made public on April 23 that WGSA would affiliate with The CW. In response to this announcement, Comcast removed "WBVH" from its channel lineup. Its successor, The CW Plus, affiliated with WGCW-LP, a low power station co-owned with WGSA on channel 38 and available exclusively on Comcast channel 240 as part of their digital lineup. WGCW was also available over-the-air via WGSA's second digital subchannel until September 11, 2016.

WGSA had a modified construction permit for digital television on channel 35 which made it high-power for the first time and put the station's transmitter site just west of Savannah. On September 28, 2007, the Savannah Morning News reported after years of being the only local station Comcast rebroadcast from an over-the-air signal, WGSA had a fiber-optic cable placed into their master control connecting directly to the cable company giving the station a much clearer signal.

On February 29, 2016, it was announced that WGSA would lose its CW affiliation to the second digital subchannel of WSAV-TV on September 12 of that year. Following a Chapter 11 bankruptcy auction in September 2017, Lowcountry 34 Media, LLC (operated by Jeff and Janet Winemiller) agreed to buy the station from Southern TV Corporation for $1.2 million. Lowcountry 34 Media had reserved the call sign WSCG for assignment when it took control February 1, 2018. WSCG resumed broadcasting April 1, 2018, under new ownership.

On May 21, 2019, it was announced that Lowcountry 34 Media would sell WSCG to HC2 Holdings for $2.6 million. The sale received FCC approval on July 2, 2019; however, Winemiller Television filed a notice of non-consummation of the purchase on November 7. Subsequently, on January 28, 2020, Lowcountry 34 Media announced it would sell the station to Marion, Illinois–based Total Christian Television for $3 million. The sale was completed on April 1, making WSCG an owned-and-operated station of the TCT Network and the first full-power religious station in the Savannah market. In addition, Lowcountry 34 Media also announced that it would sell WSCG-LD and translator WGCB-LD to Marquee Broadcasting.

== Newscast ==
In-early October 2013, WGSA established a news share agreement with NBC affiliate WSAV-TV, channel 3 (at the time owned by Media General). The arrangement resulted in a prime time newscast debuting on this station. Known on-air as WSAV News 3 at 10, the program was seen for thirty minutes on weeknights. It was effectively "moved" from previously airing at 7 p.m. on MyNetworkTV/MeTV outlet WSAV-DT2 (now a CW affiliate). With the switch to 10 o'clock, the show later broadcast in high definition on WGSA and was seen through a standard definition simulcast on WSAV-DT2. The newscast was also streamed live on WSAV's website.

== Technical information ==
=== Subchannels ===
The station's signal is multiplexed:

Subchannels of WSCG
Subchannel	Res.	Short name	Programming
34.1	1080i	WSCG HD	TCT
34.2	480i	TrueCri	True Crime Network
34.3	480i	Cozi	Cozi TV
34.4	480i	Quest	Quest
34.5	480i	SBN	Sonlife
34.6	480i	Buzzr	MeTV Toons
34.7	480i	Heroes	Heroes & Icons
34.8	480i	Start	Start TV
34.9	480i	INFO CH	Infomercials
34.10	480i	ONTV4U	OnTV4U (4:3)

=== Analog-to-digital conversion ===
WSCG (as WGSA) shut down its analog signal, over UHF channel 34, on February 17, 2009, the original target date on which full-power television stations in the United States were to transition from analog to digital broadcasts under federal mandate (which was later pushed back to June 12, 2009). The station's digital signal broadcasts on its pre-transition UHF channel 35, using virtual channel 34.

=== Translators ===
In addition to its main signal, WSCG operated two digital translators.

- Beaufort, etc.: W14EP-D
- Hinesville–Richmond Hill, GA: W36EZ-D

The two former translators now operate independently as WSCG-LD and WGCB-LD, respectively, with WSCG-LD broadcasting its own programming and WGCB-LD acting as its translator. WGSA's signal was also repeated by WGCW-LP in Savannah, Georgia. WGCW-LP's license was canceled by the FCC effective February 16, 2017, due to having been silent since September 12, 2016.

== See also ==
- Channel 34 virtual TV stations in the United States
- Channel 35 digital TV stations in the United States
