= KMSN =

KMSN may refer to:

- Dane County Regional Airport, Wisconsin, United States (ICAO code: KMSN)
- KMSN (FM), a radio station (104.1 FM) licensed to serve Mason, Texas, United States
