= Chy =

Chy or CHY may refer to:

- Chy Davidson (born 1959), American football player
- Chysis, a genus of orchids abbreviated Chy
- Cheyenne language, by ISO 639 code CHY
- Chertsey railway station, with station code CHY
- Choiseul Bay Airport, in the Solomon Islands by IATA code
- CHY FM, a youth-run community radio station in Coffs Harbour, New South Wales, Australia
