= WRGX =

WRGX may refer to:

- WRGX-LD, a low-power television station (channel 23) licensed to serve Dothan, Alabama, United States
- WPVM (FM), a radio station (88.5 FM) licensed to Sturgeon Bay, Wisconsin, United States, which used the call sign WRGX from 1998 to 2008
- WXPK, a radio station (107.1 FM) licensed to Briarcliff Manor, New York, United States, which used the call sign WRGX from 1994 to 1997
