= WNLI =

WNLI may refer to:

- WNLI (FM), a radio station (94.5 FM) licensed to serve State College, Pennsylvania, United States
- WPVM (FM), a radio station (88.5 FM) licensed to serve Sturgeon Bay, Wisconsin, United States, which held the call sign WNLI from 2008 to 2014
