= XHCCG-FM =

Radio station in Monclova, Coahuila

- Monclova, Coahuila; Mexico
- Broadcast area: Monclova, Coahuila
- Frequency: 104.1 MHz
- Branding: La Furia del Norte

Programming
- Format: Grupera

Ownership
- Owner: Radio Medios de Monclova; (Radio Medios de Coahuila, S.A. de C.V.)

History
- First air date: November 11, 1996 (concession)
- Call sign meaning: CuatroCiéneGas

Technical information
- Licensing authority: CRT
- Class: AA
- ERP: 5 kW
- HAAT: −93.2 m (−306 ft)

Links
- Website: web.archive.org/web/20160115180635/http://www.radiomedios.org/xhccg.php

XHCCG-FM is a radio station on 104.1 FM in Monclova, Coahuila. It is owned by Radio Medios de Monclova and is known as La Furia del Norte with a grupera format.

== History ==
XHCCG received its concession on November 11, 1996. It was originally slated to operate on 104.7 MHz from Cuatrociénegas and was owned by Radio Medios founder Melchor Sánchez Dovalina. The station later moved into Monclova and took the 104.1 MHz frequency.
