= WXVM =

Simulcasts WRVM, Suring
- Merrill, Wisconsin; United States
- Broadcast area: Wausau-Stevens Point
- Frequency: 104.1 MHz

Programming
- Format: Christian radio

Ownership
- Owner: WRVM, Inc.
- Sister stations: WRVM; WMVM; WHJL; WPVM; WYVM

History
- First air date: 1973 (as WJMT-FM)
- Former call signs: WJMT-FM (1973–1987); WMZK (1987–2017)
- Call sign meaning: disambiguation of WRVM's calls

Technical information
- Licensing authority: FCC
- Facility ID: 57224
- Class: C2
- ERP: 24,000 watts
- HAAT: 188 meters (617 ft)
- Transmitter coordinates: 45°6′14″N 89°43′5″W

Links
- Public license information: Public file; LMS
- Webcast: Listen live
- Website: www.wrvm.org

WXVM (104.1 FM is a radio station licensed to Merrill, Wisconsin. The station was originally titled as "Z104" broadcasting a classic rock format. On April 15, 2014, at 3PM, the station switched to "Magic 104", a hot adult contemporary format, keeping the WMZK call sign. The station's ratings fell quickly and badly, with many complaints of the switch (removing a well-known rock station for a format which failed earlier in the city on 96.7.) On January 12, 2015, the station switched back to Z104, again under the direction of Quicksilver, but slightly changed their format, to classic rock. The original format change to hot AC came when Radio One Communications agreed to acquire WMZK and WJMT from Barracuda Broadcasting/Quicksilver Broadcasting for $595,000 and immediate Time Brokerage Agreement. The sale never closed.

On January 24, 2017, WMZK was sold to WRVM, Inc. and went silent in preparation for a switch to a simulcast of Christian radio station WRVM. After a period of transmitter repair, on May 19, 2017, WMZK's calls were changed to WXVM and it returned to the air with a simulcast of WRVM.
