= Channel 34 TV stations in Mexico =

The following television stations broadcast on digital channel 34 in Mexico:

- XHABC-TDT in Chihuahua, Chihuahua
- XHAMC-TDT in Ciudad Acuña, Coahuila de Zaragoza
- XHAS-TDT in Tijuana, Baja California
- XHBM-TDT in Mexicali, Baja California
- XHCHN-TDT in Chilpancingo, Guerrero
- XHCIC-TDT in Cintalapa de Figueroa, Chiapas
- XHCJE-TDT in Ciudad Juárez, Chihuahua
- XHCLV-TDT on Cerro de las Lajas, Veracruz
- XHCNS-TDT in Cananea, Sonora
- XHCPA-TDT in Campeche, Campeche
- XHCPS-TDT in Cumpas, Sonora
- XHCTMO-TDT in Morelia, Michoacán
- XHGPD-TDT in Gómez Palacio, Durango
- XHKC-TDT in Fresnillo, Zacatecas
- XHLQR-TDT in Chetumal, Quintana Roo
- XHLSI-TDT in Mazatlán, Sinaloa
- XHMBT-TDT in Ciudad Mante, Tamaulipas
- XHMET-TDT in Tenosique, Tabasco
- XHMHG-TDT in Ciudad Hidalgo, Michoacán
- XHMPU-TDT in Puruándiro, Michoacán
- XHMTC-TDT in Tacámbaro, Michoacán
- XHMZA-TDT in Zacapu, Michoacán
- XHMZN-TDT in Mazatan, Sonora
- XHNQR-TDT in Cancún, Quintana Roo
- XHOXO-TDT in Oaxaca, Oaxaca
- XHPIX-TDT in Santiago Pinotepa Nacional, Oaxaca
- XHPTP-TDT on Pico Tres Padres, México
- XHQUE-TDT in Querétaro, Querétaro
- XHSAC-TDT in Santa Bárbara, Chihuahua
- XHSBC-TDT in Sabinas-Nueva Rosita, Coahuila
- XHSGE-TDT in Suaqui Grande, Sonora
- XHSLT-TDT in San Luis Potosí, San Luis Potosí
- XHSPRLA-TDT in León, Guanajuato
- XHSPY-TDT in Tepic, Nayarit
- XHSTA-TDT in Villahermosa, Tabasco
- XHTDJA-TDT in Guadalajara, Jalisco
- XHTGG-TDT in Tecpan de Galeana, Guerrero
- XHTHP-TDT in Tehuacán, Puebla
- XHTWH-TDT in Tulancingo, Hidalgo
- XHTZA-TDT in Zamora, Michoacán
- XHURU-TDT in Uruapan, Michoacán
- XHVET-TDT in La Venta, Tabasco
