= List of programs broadcast by independent stations =

The following is a list of programs broadcast by independent television stations in the United States.

== Cartoons ==
- Looney Tunes
- Tom and Jerry

== Sitcoms ==
- Sanford and Son (1970s)
- WKRP in Cincinnati (1981)
