= XHHGR-FM =

Radio Fórmula station in Villahermosa, Tabasco, Mexico

Villahermosa, Tabasco; Mexico
- Frequency: 94.1 MHz
- Branding: Radio Fórmula

Ownership
- Owner: Radio Fórmula; (Transmisora Regional Radio Fórmula, S.A. de C.V.)

History
- First air date: November 16, 1965 (concession)
- Call sign meaning: Hermanos Gaudiano Rovirosa

Technical information
- ERP: 25 kW
- Transmitter coordinates: 17°55′50″N 93°00′04″W

Links
- Website: radioformulatabasco.com

XHHGR-FM is a radio station on 94.1 FM in Villahermosa, Tabasco, Mexico. The station is an owned and operated outlet of Radio Fórmula.

== History ==
XHHGR began as XEVL-AM 620, receiving its concession on November 16, 1965 and owned by Josefa Landero de Calderón. It soon became XEACM-AM, named after her husband, Tabasco radio pioneer Aquiles Calderón Marchenas. Upon her death, ownership passed to her successors.

In the 1990s, MVS Radio's Tabasco regional affiliate, owned by José Gerardo Gaudiano Peralta, operated this station and XEVT-AM. The call sign was changed to XEHGR-AM for the Gaudiano Rovirosa brothers. (The XEACM call sign was relocated to another station owned by the Calderón family in Cárdenas—later XHACM-FM—which closed on January 31, 2021.)

In 2000, Radio Fórmula bought the station. It received approval to move to FM in 2010.
