= XHCDH-FM =

Radio station in Ciudad Cuauhtémoc, Chihuahua

- Ciudad Cuauhtémoc, Chihuahua; Mexico
- Frequency: 104.1 FM
- Branding: La Sabrosita

Programming
- Format: Regional Mexican

Ownership
- Owner: Grupo BM Radio; (Radiodifusora XHCDH, S.A. de C.V.)

History
- First air date: November 30, 1994 (concession)
- Call sign meaning: "Ciudad Cuauhtémoc"

Technical information
- Licensing authority: CRT
- Class: B
- ERP: 3 kW
- HAAT: 523.5 m (1,718 ft)

Links
- Webcast: Listen live
- Website: gbmradio.com

XHCDH-FM is a radio station on 104.1 FM in Ciudad Cuauhtémoc, Chihuahua, Mexico. The station is owned by Grupo BM Radio and known as La Sabrosita with a Regional Mexican format.

== History ==
XHCDH received its concession on November 30, 1994. It was owned by José Guadalupe Bernal Vázquez. It was originally known as La Suavecita before changing to Digital Estéreo in 2000; the present La Sabrosita moniker was adopted in 2011.
