= CFTV-DT =

Television station in Leamington, Ontario

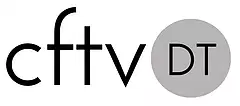
- Leamington, Ontario; Canada
- Channels: Digital: 30 (UHF); Virtual: 34
- Branding: CFTV-DT 34: Community Focus Television; CFTV 34 Action News

Programming
- Affiliations: 34.1: Independent/Community; for others, see § Subchannels

Ownership
- Owner: Southshore Broadcasting

History
- Founded: December 29, 2005
- Former call signs: CFTV-TV (2005–2012)
- Former channel numbers: Analog: 34 (UHF, 2005–2012); Digital: 34 (UHF, 2012–2020)
- Call sign meaning: Community Focused Television

Technical information
- Licensing authority: CRTC
- ERP: 0.584 kW
- HAAT: 63 m (207 ft)
- Transmitter coordinates: 42°5′38″N 82°43′48″W

Links
- Website: www.cftvdt.com

CFTV-DT (channel 34) is a low-power community television station in Leamington, Ontario, Canada. The station is owned by a local non-profit consortium known as Southshore Broadcasting. CFTV-DT's transmitter is located on South Talbot Road in Cottam, Ontario.

CFTV-DT's signal reaches as far as Harrow, Tilbury, and the village of South Woodslee in the town of Lakeshore. The station is available in the Leamington area on Cogeco digital cable channel 100 and Gosfield North IPTV channel 34, and nationwide on Bell Satellite TV channel 586. Currently, viewers in Windsor and Detroit are unable to view the station as its over-the-air signal is too weak to be received in these areas nor is the station available on cable.

== History ==
The station was licensed by the Canadian Radio-television and Telecommunications Commission (CRTC) in 2003. On March 8, 2006, the Windsor Star stated that CFTV would begin regular transmissions on March 9, 2006, at 6 p.m. In the March 17, 2006 edition of the Windsor Star, it was confirmed that Leamington Municipal Council had allocated $12,000 per year to broadcast council meetings on the station.

CFTV's logo (2011–2012), it was edited slightly when it was moved to Cable Channel 100

== Digital television ==
In replies to questions asked via email, the CRTC has stated that CFTV is not required to convert to digital, because it is a low-powered station fairly far from Windsor–Detroit, and thus, has not received a digital assignment and was not required to flash-cut on its current channel to digital operations on August 31, 2011.

On August 17, 2012, the CRTC approved the station's request to begin broadcasting in digital on its current channel, 34. In addition, the station has also received permission to carry four subchannels, making it the first station in Canada to launch original content on its multiplex channels.

=== Subchannels ===
Subchannels of CFTV-DT
Subchannel	Res.	Short name	Programming
34.1	480i		Independent/Community
34.2	480i		French independent (6 a.m.–6 p.m.); Spanish independent (6 p.m.–6 a.m.)
34.3	480i		Caldwell/Kettle Point/Stoney Point First Nation and special needs/described video programming
34.4	480i		Leamington and Essex County council meetings/Local news
