= WRVM =

- Suring, Wisconsin; United States
- Broadcast area: Green Bay, Wisconsin - Appleton, Wisconsin - Northeastern Wisconsin
- Frequency: 102.7 MHz

Programming
- Format: Christian radio

Ownership
- Owner: WRVM, Inc.
- Sister stations: WHJL, WMVM, WPVM, WYVM, WXVM

History
- First air date: September 17, 1967
- Call sign meaning: Wisconsin's Radio Voice of the Master

Technical information
- Licensing authority: FCC
- Facility ID: 73974
- Class: C1
- ERP: 100,000 watts
- HAAT: 299 meters (981 ft)
- Transmitter coordinates: 44°59′50″N 88°23′49.40″W

Links
- Public license information: Public file; LMS
- Webcast: Listen live
- Website: wrvm.org

WRVM is a Christian radio station licensed to Suring, Wisconsin, broadcasting on 102.7 FM. WRVM serves all of Northeast Wisconsin, including Green Bay and Appleton. The station began broadcasting September 17, 1967, and has always aired a Christian format.

WRVM is also simulcast on full powered stations WHJL 88.1 in Merrill, which serves North-Central Wisconsin including; Wausau, Rhinelander, and Woodruff, WMVM 90.7 in Goodman which serves the Iron Mountain-Kingsford area of the Upper Peninsula of Michigan, WPVM 88.5 in Sturgeon Bay, which serves Door County, WYVM 90.9 in Sheboygan, and WXVM 104.1 in Merrill which also covers Wausau. WRVM is also heard on numerous low powered translators throughout Northern, Central, and Eastern Wisconsin, as well as Michigan's Upper Peninsula.

== Programming ==
WRVM's programming consists of Christian talk and teaching as well as traditional Christian music. Christian talk and teaching shows heard on WRVM include; Insight for Living with Chuck Swindoll, Revive Our Hearts with Nancy DeMoss Wolgemuth, Grace to You with John MacArthur, Thru the Bible with J. Vernon McGee, Truth for Life with Alistair Begg, Joni & Friends, In the Market with Janet Parshall, Turning Point with David Jeremiah, and Unshackled!.

== Simulcasts ==
=== Full-powered stations ===
Call sign	Frequency	City of license	State	Facility ID	Class	ERP (W)	Height (m (ft))
WMVM	90.7 FM	Goodman	Wisconsin	59353	C3	7,000	87 m (285 ft)
WHJL	88.1 FM	Merrill	Wisconsin	176585	C1	63,000	164 m (538 ft)
WXVM	104.1 FM	Merrill	Wisconsin	57224	C3	8,300	144 m (472 ft)
WYVM	90.9 FM	Sheboygan	Wisconsin	176342	C3	6,100	40 m (130 ft)
WPVM	88.5 FM	Sturgeon Bay	Wisconsin	85042	C2	15,000	158 m (518 ft)

=== Translators ===
Call sign	Frequency (MHz)	City of license	State	Facility ID	Class	ERP (W)
W290CO	105.9	Iron Mountain	Michigan	144821	D	13
W237AW	95.3	Iron River	Michigan	71610	D	50
W287CJ	105.3	Norway	Michigan	140960	D	250
W255CB	98.9	Powers	Michigan	142649	D	27
W266CC	101.1	Abbotsford	Wisconsin	143372	D	120
W269CJ	101.7	Appleton	Wisconsin	150176	D	55
W296AD	107.1	Eagle River	Wisconsin	14549	D	250
W276BC	103.1	Ellison Bay	Wisconsin	141054	D	38
W268BG	101.5	Green Bay	Wisconsin	143318	D	205
W280DT	103.9	Lac du Flambeau	Wisconsin	148608	D	240
W292CG	106.3	Land O'Lakes	Wisconsin	36490	D	120
W264BE	100.7	Manitowoc	Wisconsin	155136	D	80
W217BO	91.3	Marshfield	Wisconsin	122231	D	55
W254BB	98.7	Medford	Wisconsin	122222	D	170
W208BV	89.5	Mercer	Wisconsin	122219	D	250
W273CQ	102.5	Minocqua	Wisconsin	90881	D	170
W272BT	102.3	Mosinee	Wisconsin	155161	D	99
W265CR	100.9	Nekoosa	Wisconsin	150229	D	120
W203AV	88.5	North Fond du Lac	Wisconsin	89736	D	80
W268BC	101.5	Oshkosh	Wisconsin	150234	D	49
W280AF	103.9	Phelps	Wisconsin	14545	D	27
W263BQ	100.5	Sheboygan	Wisconsin	140875	D	80
W232BE	94.3	Stevens Point	Wisconsin	154852	D	170
W297AH	107.3	Wautoma	Wisconsin	143483	D	80
W226BM	93.1	Wisconsin Rapids	Wisconsin	141036	D	250
