= WZIN =

WZER
Simulcast of WERR, Vega Alta, Puerto Rico
- Charlotte Amalie, U.S. Virgin Islands; United States
- Broadcast area: U.S. Virgin Islands; British Virgin Islands; Puerto Rico
- Frequency: 104.3 MHz
- Branding: 104.1/104.3 FM Redentor

Programming
- Language: Spanish
- Format: Contemporary Christian

Ownership
- Owner: WERR Radio Redentor, Inc.; (Radio Redentor Inc.)
- Sister stations: WERR

History
- First air date: November 2, 1976
- Former call signs: WCRN (1976–1983); WSTT (1983–1987); WCWI (1987–1987); WIYC (1987–1997); WVPI (1997–2002); WZIN (2002–2025)

Technical information
- Licensing authority: FCC
- Facility ID: 51322
- Class: B
- ERP: 44,000 watts
- HAAT: 893.0 meters (2,929.8 ft)
- Transmitter coordinates: 18°21′35.0″N 64°58′19.0″W

Links
- Public license information: Public file; LMS
- Website: www.redentor104fm.com

WZER (104.3 FM) is a commercial radio station licensed to Charlotte Amalie, U.S. Virgin Islands. WZER is simulcast with WERR (104.1 FM) in Vega Alta, Puerto Rico, both airing a Contemporary Christian format. WZER serves the U.S. Virgin Islands, the British Virgin Islands, and Puerto Rico. The station is owned by WERR Radio Redentor, Inc., through licensee Radio Redentor Inc.

== Logos ==
Former WZIN logo as The Buzz from 2003 to 2022
