= XHECQ-FM =

Radio station in Culiacán, Sinaloa

- Culiacán, Sinaloa; Mexico
- Frequency: 104.1 FM
- Branding: La Mejor 104.1

Programming
- Format: Grupera
- Affiliations: MVS Radio

Ownership
- Owner: Grupo Promomedios; (Radio CQ de Culiacán, S.A. de C.V.)
- Sister stations: XHLCE-FM

History
- First air date: April 26, 1947 (concession)

Technical information
- Licensing authority: CRT
- Class: B1
- ERP: 25 kW
- HAAT: 62.29 m (204.4 ft)
- Transmitter coordinates: 24°49′20″N 107°28′36″W

Links
- Website: lamejor.com.mx/culiacan

XHECQ-FM is a radio station on 104.1 FM in Culiacán, Sinaloa. It is owned by Promomedios and carries the La Mejor grupera format from MVS Radio.

== History ==
XECQ-AM 920 received its concession on April 26, 1947. It was owned by Radio Culiacán and operated with 1,000 watts during the day and 100 watts at night. In the 1980s, daytime power was raised to 5,000 watts, and the 1990s saw nighttime power increase to 500.

XECQ migrated to FM in 2010 as XHECQ-FM 104.1.

On June 1, 2020, XHECQ-FM became an affiliate of the La Mejor grupera network from MVS Radio.
