= CKFF-FM =

First Nations community radio station in Kipawa, Quebec

- Kipawa, Quebec; Canada
- Frequency: 104.1 MHz
- Branding: Drumbeat Radio

Programming
- Format: First Nations community radio

Ownership
- Owner: Kebaowek First Nation

History
- First air date: 2020

Technical information
- Class: A
- ERP: 6,000 watts
- HAAT: 55.5 metres

Links
- Website: drumbeatradio.ca

CKFF-FM is a First Nations community radio station that operates at 104.1 MHz (FM) in Kipawa, Quebec, Canada.

Branded as Drumbeat Radio, the station airs a variety of programs, interviews, stories, culture and music including country, rock, pop and more.

== History ==
On November 13, 2018, Kebaowek First Nation (OBCI) received approval from the Canadian Radio-television and Telecommunications Commission (CRTC) to operate a new english-language Indigenous (Type B Native) FM radio programming in Kipawa, Quebec which would operate at 104.1 MHz (channel 281A) with an average effective radiated power (ERP) of 6,000 watts (non-directional antenna with an effective height of antenna above average terrain of 55.5 metres).

The station signed on the air as Drumbeat Radio in April 2020.

On August 30, 2024, Kebaowek First Nation received CRTC approval to increase CKFF-FM's power from 6,000 to 8,650 watts and raising the antenna height from 55.5 to 67.2 metres (EHAAT) with a non-directional radiation pattern.
