= XHVT-FM =

Radio station in Villahermosa, Tabasco, Mexico

Villahermosa, Tabasco; Mexico
- Frequency: 104.1 FM
- Branding: XEVT

Programming
- Format: News/talk

Ownership
- Owner: Sibilla Zurita family; (Jasz Radio, S.A. de C.V.)

History
- First air date: 7 August 1954
- Call sign meaning: "Villahermosa, Tabasco"

Technical information
- ERP: 25 kW
- Transmitter coordinates: 18°02′42″N 92°54′00″W

Links
- Webcast: Listen live
- Website: xevt.com

XHVT-FM is a radio station on 104.1 FM in Villahermosa, Tabasco, Mexico, known as XEVT (its former AM call sign).

When XEVT-AM 970 began broadcasting in August 1954, it was the only radio station in Tabasco.

== History ==
XEVT-AM 970 began testing on 7 August 1954, making it the oldest radio station in Tabasco. (It was not the first; in the late 1940s, a station with the call sign XEVV operated from Villahermosa.) It was owned by Aquiles Calderón Marchena and authorized to broadcast with 5,000 watts during the day and 400 at night. It conducted tests throughout August and early September. The concession was awarded on 14 September, and the very next day, XEVT was formally inaugurated by Governor Manuel Bartlett Bautista. The arrival of radio came at a time when the Tabasco state government under governor Manuel Bartlett Bautista focused on modernizing the state by electrifying communities and building new airports.

Not long after XEVT signed on, political turmoil roiled Tabasco. On 16 March 1955, a group attempted to use XEVT to broadcast messages fomenting unrest in the state. When the radio station's staff said no, they attempted to enter by force. One person died, and much of XEVT's new equipment was destroyed. Broadcasts resumed the next month. In the late 1950s, Tabasco native Manuel López Ochoa started his creative career as an announcer at XEVT.

The station changed hands and names regularly as time went on. Originally known as "La Voz de Tabasco", it soon became "Radio Fiesta", "Súper Variedades" and even for a time Stereorey. In 1978, the XEVT concession was transferred to Radio Sureste, S.A. The 1980s saw the station come under the management of Radio S.A. In 1999, it was sold to the Sibilla family (headed by Jesús Antonio Sibilla Zurita, 1922–1989), who relaunched XEVT as a full-service station with news and talk programs.; Jesús Antonio Sibilla Zurita had been associated with XEVT from the late 1950s, starting Telereportaje, the station's primary news program, from 1958 until his 1989 death. On 31 July 2000, XEVT's concession transferred to Jasz Radio.

XEVT was approved to migrate to FM on 4 June 2010, becoming XHVT-FM 104.1.
