= WEPV-LP =

- Hampton, Virginia; United States
- Broadcast area: Hampton, Virginia; Newport News, Virginia
- Frequency: 104.1 MHz
- Branding: Star of the Sea Catholic Radio

Programming
- Format: Catholic radio

Ownership
- Owner: St. Mary Star of the Sea Catholic Church

History
- First air date: 2017

Technical information
- Licensing authority: FCC
- Facility ID: 195988
- Class: L1
- Power: 100 watts
- HAAT: 29.6 meters (97 ft)
- Transmitter coordinates: 37°3′00.50″N 76°23′20.80″W

Links
- Public license information: LMS

WEPV-LP is a Catholic Religious formatted broadcast radio station. The station is licensed to Hampton, Virginia and serving Hampton and Newport News in Virginia. WEPV-LP is owned and operated by St. Mary Star of the Sea Catholic Church.
