= XETVH-AM =

Radio station in Cunduacán, Tabasco, Mexico

Cunduacán, Tabasco; Mexico
- Frequency: 1230 kHz
- Branding: La Radio de Tabasco

Programming
- Format: Public radio

Ownership
- Owner: Gobierno del Estado de Tabasco
- Sister stations: XHTVH-FM

History
- First air date: 1983
- Call sign meaning: Tabasco VillaHermosa

Technical information
- Power: XETVH: 20 kW day/1 kW night

Links
- Website: corat.mx

XETVH-AM is a radio station on 1230 AM in Cunduacán, Tabasco, Mexico, serving Villahermosa. It is part of the state government's Radio and Television Commission (CORAT) and is known as La Radio de Tabasco.

XETVH heads a four-station network of stations, two on AM and two on FM, with the same programming.

== History ==
XETVH came to air in 1983 and XETQE in 1998. XHVET-FM and XHJON-FM were awarded in 2011 alongside XHTQE-FM.

== Transmitters ==
Callsign	Frequency	City	Power
XETVH-AM	1230 kHz	Cunduacán	20 kW day/1 kW night
XETQE-AM	1120 kHz	Tenosique	5 kW day/0.5 kW night
XHVET-FM	90.5 MHz	La Venta	25 kW ERP
XHJON-FM	100.7 MHz	Jonuta	3 kW ERP
