= Independent station =

Television stations that are not affiliated with a television network

An independent station is a broadcast station, usually a television station, not affiliated with a larger broadcast network. As such, it only broadcasts syndicated programs it has purchased; brokered programming, for which a third party pays the station for airtime; and local programs that it produces itself.

In North American and Japanese television, independent stations with general entertainment formats emerged as a distinct class of station because their lack of network affiliation led to unique strategies in program content, scheduling, and promotion, as well as different economics compared to major network affiliates. The Big Three networks in the United States — ABC, CBS, and NBC — traditionally provided a substantial number of program hours per day to their affiliates, whereas later network startups—Fox, UPN, and The WB (the latter two were succeeded by The CW and, to a lesser extent, MyNetworkTV)—provided substantially fewer shows to their affiliates. Through the early 1990s, Fox affiliates were often considered de facto independents.

== Programming ==
The term independent station most often is used to refer to stations with general entertainment formats. Historically, these stations specialized in children's programming, syndicated reruns or first-run shows, and sports coverage.

Some independent stations, mostly those once having been affiliated with a major network, produce substantial amounts of news and public affairs programming. The model for these stations was WSVN in Miami, an NBC affiliate that switched to Fox in January 1989 and dramatically expanded its news output. Further affiliation changes and news expansions from the 1990s onward have produced a number of additional stations, such as KTVK in Phoenix (an ABC affiliate until 1995); WJXT in Jacksonville, Florida (a CBS affiliate until 2002); WHDH in Boston (an NBC affiliate until 2017); WPLG in Miami (an ABC affiliate until 2025); and WANF in Atlanta (a CBS affiliate until 2025), as well as stations such as WGN-TV in Chicago and KUSI-TV in San Diego that never held a major network affiliation.

However, in a broader sense, there are independent stations that focus on a specific genre of television programming. For instance, religious independent stations buy and schedule, or produce locally, evangelism and study programs, and ethnic independent stations purchase or produce programs in specific languages or catering to specific communities.

== Overview ==
=== Early history ===
During the 1950s and 1960s, independent stations filled their broadcast hours with movies, sports, cartoons, filmed travelogues, and some locally produced television programs, including in some instances newscasts and children's programs. Independents that were on the air during this period would sign-on at times later than that of stations affiliated with a television network, some not doing so until the early or mid-afternoon hours. Another source of programming became available to independent stations by the mid-1960s: reruns of network programs which, after completing their initial runs, were sold into syndication.

As cable television franchises began to be incorporated around the United States during the 1960s and 1970s, independent stations from large and mid-sized markets were imported by these systems via wire or microwave relay to smaller media markets, which often only had stations that were affiliated with the Big Three television networks (ABC, NBC and CBS); these independents became the first "superstations," which were distributed on a statewide or regional basis. In December 1976, Ted Turner decided to uplink his struggling Atlanta, Georgia station WTCG to satellite for national distribution. Soon, other companies decided to copy Turner's idea and applied for satellite uplinks to distribute other stations; WGN-TV in Chicago, KTVU in Oakland-San Francisco, and WPIX and WOR-TV in New York City would begin to be distributed nationally during the late 1970s and early 1980s (in the case of KTVU, it would revert to being a regional superstation by the early part of the latter decade).

By the start of the 1970s, independent stations typically aired children's programming in the morning and afternoon hours, and movies and other adult-oriented shows (some stations aired paid religious programs) during the midday hours. They counterprogrammed local network-affiliated stations' news programs with syndicated reruns – usually sitcoms and hour-long dramas – in the early evening, and movies during prime time and late night hours. In some areas, independent stations carried network programs that were not aired by a local affiliate.

In larger markets such as New York City, Chicago and Los Angeles, independent stations benefited from a ruling by the Federal Communications Commission (FCC) that barred network-affiliated stations within the top 50 television markets from airing network-originated programs in the hour preceding prime time. This legislation, known as the Prime Time Access Rule, was in effect from 1971 to 1995, and as a result independents faced less competition for syndicated reruns. Some stations in larger markets (such as WGN-TV in Chicago; KTLA, KHJ-TV, KTTV and KCOP-TV in Los Angeles; KWGN-TV in Denver; and (W)WOR-TV, WPIX and WNEW-TV in New York City) ventured into local news broadcasts, usually airing at 10:00 p.m. in the Eastern and Pacific time zones, and 9:00 p.m. in the Central and Mountain time zones. Network stations aired their late newscasts an hour later.

From the late 1970s through the mid-1980s, independent stations in several U.S. cities, particularly those that had yet to receive a cable franchise, carried a form of a network affiliation through subscription television networks (such as ON TV, Spectrum and SelecTV); these services – which were formatted very similarly to their pay cable counterparts – ran sports, uncut and commercial-free movies (both mainstream and pornographic, broadcasts of the latter often created legal issues that were eventually largely cleared up due to an FCC regulation that legally allowed the broadcast of programs featuring content that would otherwise be deemed indecent when broadcast "in the clear" if the encrypted signal was not visible or audible to nonsubscribers), and on some services, television specials. Independents usually ran the services during the evening and overnight hours in lieu of running movies and other programs acquired off the syndication market by the station, although a few eventually began to carry these services for most of the broadcast day. The services required the use of decoder boxes to access the service's programming (some of which were fairly easy to unencrypt due to the transmission methods stations used to scramble the signal during the service's broadcast hours); some required the payment of an additional one-time fee to receive events and adult films. As cities added cable franchises, thus allowing people to subscribe to conventional premium television networks like HBO and Showtime, nearly all of the over-the-air subscription services had shuttered operations by the end of the 1980s.

Until the late 1970s, independent stations were usually limited to the larger American television markets, due to several factors. Most smaller markets did not have a large enough population to support four commercial stations. Even in markets that were large enough to support a fourth station, the only available license was often on a UHF channel allocation. During the analog television era, the reception quality of UHF stations was not nearly as good as stations on the VHF band, especially in areas with rugged terrain (the reverse is true in the present day with the transmission of digital signals) or in markets that cover large geographic areas. Since independent stations had to buy an additional 16 hours of programming per day – a burden not faced by network-affiliated stations – these factors made prospective owners skittish about signing on a television station as an independent. By the 1970s, however, cable television had gained enough penetration to make independent stations viable in smaller markets. This was especially true in markets that were either located in rugged terrain or covered large areas; in these regions, cable (and later satellite) are all but essential for acceptable television. Nearly 300 independent stations existed in the United States by the mid-1980s, in markets of varying sizes, up from fewer than 100 in 1980. They could buy new shows without cash using barter syndication. Many stations belonged to the Association of Independent Television Stations (INTV), a group similar to the National Association of Broadcasters, and which lobbied the FCC on behalf of independents.

In the 1980s, television syndicators began offering original, first-run series such as Solid Gold, Lifestyles of the Rich and Famous, Star Search, Independent Network News and Star Trek: The Next Generation (as well as canceled network series revived for first-run syndication such as Fame, Too Close for Comfort, Charles in Charge, It's a Living and Baywatch), and made-for-television movies and miniseries like Sadat. This trend primarily benefited independent stations. Independents scheduled these first-run programs during prime time and on weekends.

In the United States, many independent stations were commonly owned. Companies that operated three or more independents included:

- Chris-Craft Industries, and its subsidiary BHC Communications
- Christian Broadcasting Network
- Clear Channel Communications
- Cox Enterprises
- Gaylord Broadcasting
- Grant Broadcasting System
- Kaiser Broadcasting, and its successor Field Communications
- Meredith Corporation
- Metromedia
- Pappas Telecasting Companies
- Renaissance Broadcasting
- RKO General
- Scripps-Howard Broadcasting
- Sinclair Broadcast Group
- Taft Television and Radio Company
- Tribune Broadcasting
- TVX Broadcast Group, and its successor Paramount Stations Group

=== Decline ===
In 1986 several independent outlets, led by the Metromedia stations, formed the Fox Broadcasting Company, the first major venture at a fourth U.S. broadcast television network since the DuMont Television Network shut down in August 1956 (which resulted in some of its affiliates, including those owned by Metromedia, becoming independents). Fox made efforts, slowly at first, to have its affiliates emulate a network programming style as much as possible; but in turn, Fox only carried a late-night talk show at its launch in October 1986, and beginning in April 1987, offered one night of prime time programming a week (on Sundays). The network only programmed two hours of prime time programming each night (and, beginning in the 1990s, some children's programming through Fox Kids), but gradually expanded its prime time lineup to all seven nights until January 1993. Fox's owned-and-operated stations left INTV in March 1992.

The lack of programming in other dayparts forced most Fox affiliates to maintain the same programming model as independent stations during non-prime time slots, and during its early years, on nights without prime time programming from the network. Fox coerced most of its affiliates to air prime time newscasts (there were some holdouts as late as 2013, while many others opted to run outsourced local newscasts from a competing network affiliate) as well as news programming in other dayparts common with other major network affiliates. When a complicated six-station affiliation switch in South Florida saw WSVN in Miami switch from NBC to Fox in 1989, the station adopted a news-intensive format unlike any independent station or Fox affiliate prior, a scheduling choice initially ridiculed in local media but which quickly attracted industry attention and saw ratings success. This model was copied by stations owned by New World Communications and SF Broadcasting that switched to Fox in the mid-1990s, and to other news-producing Fox and minor network affiliates, and independent stations, by the 2000s.

In September 1993, many independents began carrying the Prime Time Entertainment Network (PTEN), an ad-hoc programming service that emulated a network model, which featured drama series and made-for-TV movies intended for first-run syndication. In January 1995, many remaining independents, including those that carried PTEN, joined upstart networks The WB and the United Paramount Network (UPN). The WB, UPN and their affiliates used a very similar programming model to that initially used by Fox and its stations during their first four years of existence (although neither network would expand their prime time lineups to all seven nights); the launch of those networks resulted in PTEN's demise in 1997, as most stations that became affiliates of UPN and The WB (whose respective founding parents, Chris-Craft Industries and Time Warner, jointly owned PTEN) either dropped the service or moved its lineup out of prime time when those networks launched. Other stations banded together to become charter outlets of the Pax TV (now Ion Television) network in August 1998, although some of the stations that aligned with Pax had earlier affiliated with its predecessor, the Infomall TV Network (inTV), two years before.

The launches of these networks drastically reduced the number of independent stations in the United States; some mid-sized markets would not regain a general entertainment independent until the early 2000s, through sign-ons of unaffiliated stations and disaffiliations by existing stations from other commercial and noncommercial networks. In 2001, Univision Communications purchased several English language independents in larger markets (which mostly operated as Home Shopping Network affiliates until the late 1990s) from USA Broadcasting to form the nuclei of Telefutura (now UniMás), which launched in January 2002. Several stations affiliated with The WB and UPN became independent again when the respective parent companies of those networks (Time Warner and CBS Corporation) decided to shut them down to form The CW, which launched in September 2006 with a schedule dominated by shows held over from and an affiliate body primarily made up of stations previously aligned with its two predecessors. Some of the newly independent stations subsequently found a new network home through MyNetworkTV, itself created out of the prospect that the UPN affiliates of corporate sister Fox Television Stations would become independents due to The CW choosing to affiliate with CBS Television Stations and Tribune Broadcasting stations in overlapping markets.

=== Today ===
While MyNetworkTV initially launched with a focus on prime time soap operas inspired by the telenovela format, these did not prove successful. After an attempt to retool the network in 2007 to add acquired films and cheaper non-scripted fare (moving away from airing the novelas as a weekday strip in the process), the network abandoned first-run programming entirely in 2009 and transitioned to becoming a "programming service" drawn from off-network reruns. After this transition, many of MyNetworkTV's affiliates began to downplay their affiliation with the network and move the programming to alternate timeslots (such as late-night or overnight); network owner Fox Television Stations rebranded most of its MyNetworkTV stations as offshoots of their parent Fox stations (such as "Fox 11 Plus" for KCOP-TV)

As a result of the various network launches that have occurred since the 1986 launch of Fox, true independent stations have become a rarity. The smallest stations, which in the past would have been forced to adopt a locally originated independent program schedule, now have other options – 24-hour-a-day networks that require no local or syndicated programming for the station to carry; some of these networks, such as AMG TV or America One, follow a full-service variety format, while others are devoted primarily to classic television (such as MeTV) and/or films, or carry mainly niche programming. Many stations that are affiliated with the larger post-1980s networks still behave much like independents, as they program far more hours a day than a station affiliated with one of the Big Three networks.

Current independents follow a very different program format from their predecessors. While sitcom reruns are still popular, expanded newscasts and other syndicated programs such as talk shows; courtroom shows; reruns of recent scripted comedy and drama series; and no-cost public domain programming are common. Another type of content being added to many independent station lineups in recent years has been brokered programming, including infomercials, home shopping and televangelist programs; the Federal Communications Commission did not allow infomercials to be broadcast on American television until 1984, but since then, it has proven to be a lucrative, if somewhat polarizing with viewers, way to fill airtime. During the 1990s when infomercials gained popularity, many stations began broadcasting 24 hours a day rather than signing off at night. By filling the overnight hours with infomercials, the station would be able to generate extra revenue where they had previously been off the air. Home shopping programs (mainly simulcasts of cable services that also have over-the-air distribution such as QVC and the Home Shopping Network) or syndicated programs fill overnight time periods on stations that do not run infomercials during that day part.

Since the FCC revised its media ownership rules to permit station duopolies in August 1999, independents that operate on a standalone basis have become quite rare in the United States and, in turn, independents that are senior partners in duopolies are fairly uncommon. With the proliferation of duopolies and local marketing agreements since that point, most independent stations are operated alongside a major network affiliate (more commonly, one of either ABC, NBC, CBS or Fox), which may share syndicated programming with and/or produce newscasts in non-competitive timeslots for its unaffiliated sister. This is because in most markets, independents tend to have lower viewership than that of a network affiliate, and usually fall within part of the FCC's duopoly criteria (which allows a company to own two stations in the same market if one is not among the four highest-rated at the time of an ownership transaction).

== List of notable Canadian independent stations ==
While independent stations were not as common in Canada, there were several notable examples of such:

List of notable Canadian independent stations
Media market	Province	Station(s)	First air date
Hamilton	Ontario	CHCH-DT	June 7, 1954
Lethbridge	Alberta	CJIL-DT	January 14, 1996
Montreal	Quebec	CFHD-DT	December 11, 2013
Montreal	Quebec	CFTU-DT	August 20, 1986
St. John's	Newfoundland and Labrador	CJON-DT	September 6, 1955
Vancouver	British Columbia	CHNU-DT	September 15, 2001
Victoria	British Columbia	CHEK-DT	December 1, 1956
Winnipeg	Manitoba	CIIT-DT	February 6, 2006

Since the mid-1990s, most independent television stations in Canada have merged into television systems (such as CTV Two) by adopting common branding and/or programming, or have become fully owned-and-operated stations of networks with which they had previously had more informal programming arrangements as with CIHF, CICT and CITV, which are all now Global stations. However, this trend was partially reversed in 2009 with the demise of Canwest's E! system, which resulted in affiliate CHCH in Hamilton becoming independent, CJNT in Montreal becoming subsequently affiliated with City in 2012 (later becoming a full-time O&O in 2013), and CHEK in Victoria) becoming independent as well (although having a secondary affiliation with Yes TV).

CHCH and CHEK are the only television stations in Canada currently operating as independent stations in the American sense of the term. However, since the fall of 2010, these two stations (previously along with CJNT) have resumed sharing some common American programming.

CJON in St. John's, Newfoundland and Labrador, while officially unaffiliated with a network, in practice airs a mix of programming sublicensed from two of Canada's main commercial networks, CTV (which it was formally affiliated with until 2002, with only CTV's news programming being carried on the station since then) and Global, rather than purchasing broadcast rights independently.

CFTU and CFHD in Montreal also operate as independents. However, each of these stations has a specific programming focus: educational programming in the case of the former, and multicultural programming in that of the latter.

Three independent religious stations also exist in Canada: CHNU in the Fraser Valley Regional District, CIIT in Winnipeg, and CJIL in Lethbridge. CIIT and CHNU formerly served as part of the two-station Joytv religious television system from 2005 until the system's dissolution in 2013.

Apart from these, some additional independent stations exist in Canada as community-oriented specialty stations. These stations, such as CFTV-DT in Leamington, Ontario and CHCO-TV in St. Andrews, New Brunswick, transmit at low power.

== Independent television in Japan ==
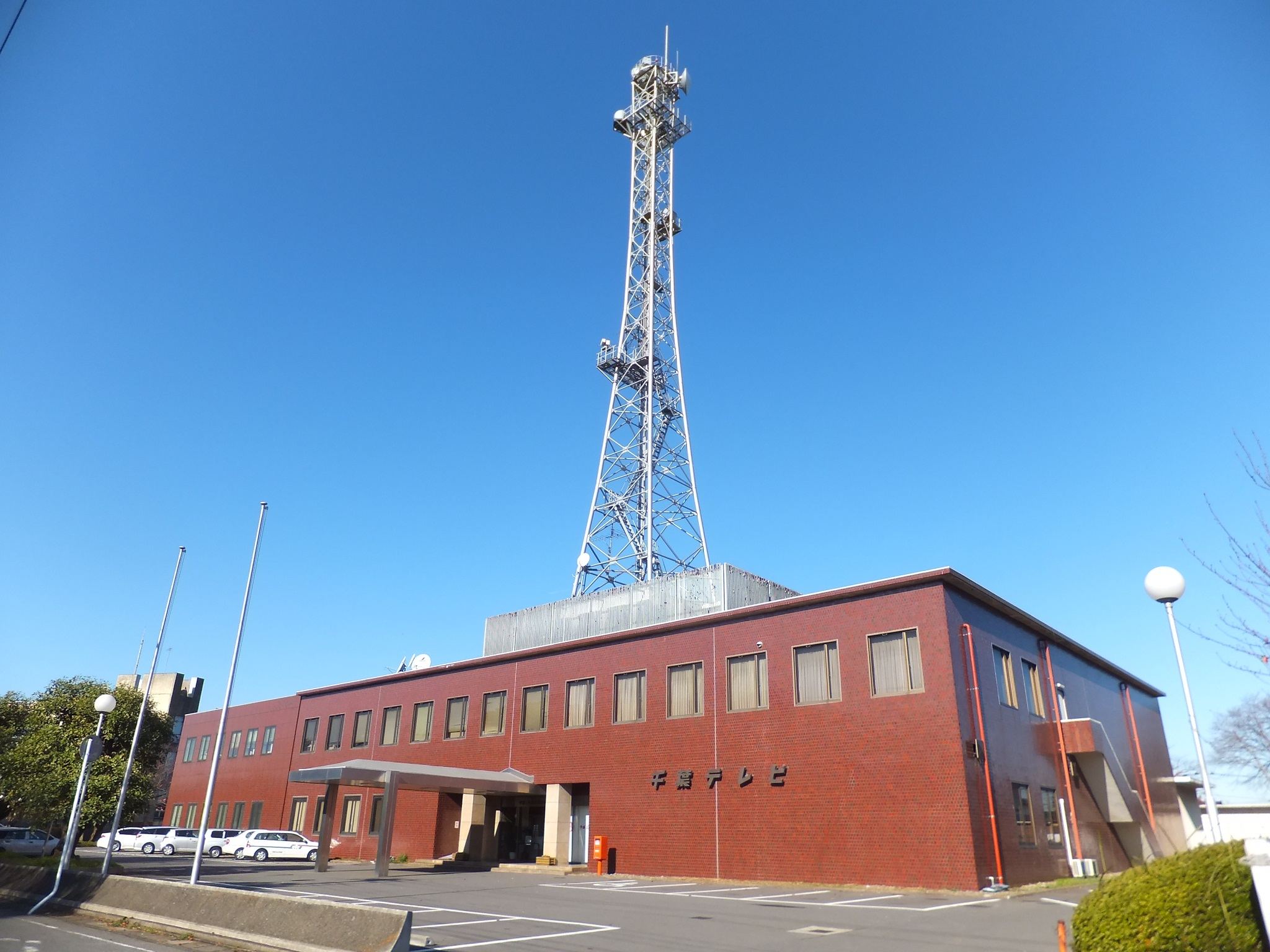
Chiba TV is one of the members of the Japanese Association of Independent Television Stations.

In Japan, independent television stations are generally those not affiliated with one of the national networks based in Tokyo, which supply the vast majority of their affiliates' programs. Independent stations in Japan primarily serve heavily urbanized areas and frequently band together in the purchasing of programs and sale of advertising.

== See also ==
- List of independent television stations in the United States
- List of programs broadcast by independent stations
- List of United States television networks
- Operation Prime Time
- Prime Time Entertainment Network
- Superstation
