= XHACM-FM =

Defunct
- Cárdenas, Tabasco; Mexico
- Frequency: 104.5 FM
- Branding: Éxitos 104.5 FM

Programming
- Format: Tropical Music and Grupera

Ownership
- Owner: Radiodifusora Asociada Calderón Lara Armando, S.A. (RACLASA)

History
- First air date: February 5, 1969 (concession)
- Last air date: January 31, 2021
- Call sign meaning: Aquiles Calderón Marchena

Technical information
- ERP: 6 kW
- Transmitter coordinates: 17°59′10″N 93°23′06″W

XHACM-FM was a radio station on 104.5 FM in Cárdenas, Tabasco, Mexico. It was owned by Armando Calderón Lara and last carried a tropical music and grupera format known as Éxitos 104.5 FM.

== History ==
XEJAC-AM received its concession on February 5, 1969. Named for its first owner, Juan Antonio Calderón Landero, XEJAC broadcast on 1110 kHz as a 1 kW daytimer. XEJAC was transferred to the final concessionaire in February 1987, by which time it had also started nighttime service with 100 watts. For many years, this station was known as Radio Éxitos.

The 1990s saw multiple changes for XEJAC. It moved to 910 kHz, where it ramped up power to 5 kW day and 1 kW night. The call sign also changed to XEACM-AM, formerly the callsign of XEHGR, named for Tabasco radio pioneer Aquiles Calderón Marchena.

XEACM was approved to migrate to FM on June 4, 2010, becoming XHACM-FM 104.5.

On January 15, 2021, concessionaire Armando Calderón Lara surrendered the concession, citing economic reasons, a loss of government advertising and the cost of adhering to electoral advertising requirements as reasons to shutter the station effective January 31. He also declared that he never recovered the investment in converting to FM radio.
