= KCUN-LP =

Currently silent
- Livingston, Texas; United States
- Frequency: 104.5 MHz
- Branding: Polk County Pagan Radio

Programming
- Format: Rock
- Affiliations: Fox News Radio; Westwood One

Ownership
- Owner: HGN Music & Education Foundation; (Jason Mclelland)

History
- First air date: March 17, 2014
- Former call signs: KXAX-LP (2014–2017)
- Former frequencies: 97.9 MHz (2014); 104.3 MHz (2014–2017)

Technical information
- Licensing authority: FCC
- Facility ID: 191837
- ERP: 21 watts
- HAAT: 61 meters (200 ft)
- Transmitter coordinates: 30°41′38.30″N 94°56′12.20″W

Links
- Public license information: LMS
- Webcast: Listen live

KCUN-LP was a broadcast radio station licensed to and serving Livingston, Texas. KCUN-LP was owned and operated by HGN Music & Education Foundation (Jason Mclelland).
