= Caldwell First Nation =

First Nation in Ontario, Canada

Caldwell First Nation Zaaga'iganiniwag
- Indian reserve
- Caldwell First Nation Indian Reserve
- Location in southern Ontario
- Coordinates: 42°03′N 82°35′W
- Country: Canada
- Province: Ontario
- County: Essex

Government
  - Chief: Nikki van Oirschot
- Time zone: EST
  - Summer (DST): EDT
- Postal Code: N8H
- Area codes: 519 and 226
- Website: caldwellfirstnation.ca

Caldwell First Nation (Ojibwe: Zaaga'iganiniwag, meaning: "people of the Lake") is a First Nations band government whose land base is located in Leamington, Ontario, Canada. They are an Anishinaabe group, part of the Three Fires Confederacy, comprising the bands Potawatomi, Odawa, and Ojibwa, whose members are originally of the Mikinaak (Turtle) and the Makwa (Bear) dodems.

The Caldwell First Nation are a distinct and federally recognized First Nation. They were formally known as the Chippewas of Pelee, Point Pelee Indians, and Caldwell's Band of Indians.

The Chippewa (also called Ojibwa in Canada) are an Anishinaabe-speaking Indigenous First Nation with people within the borders of present-day Canada and the United States. The Anishinaabe are the largest Indigenous peoples north of Mexico, with nearly 78,000 people among various groups in Canada from western Quebec to British Columbia.

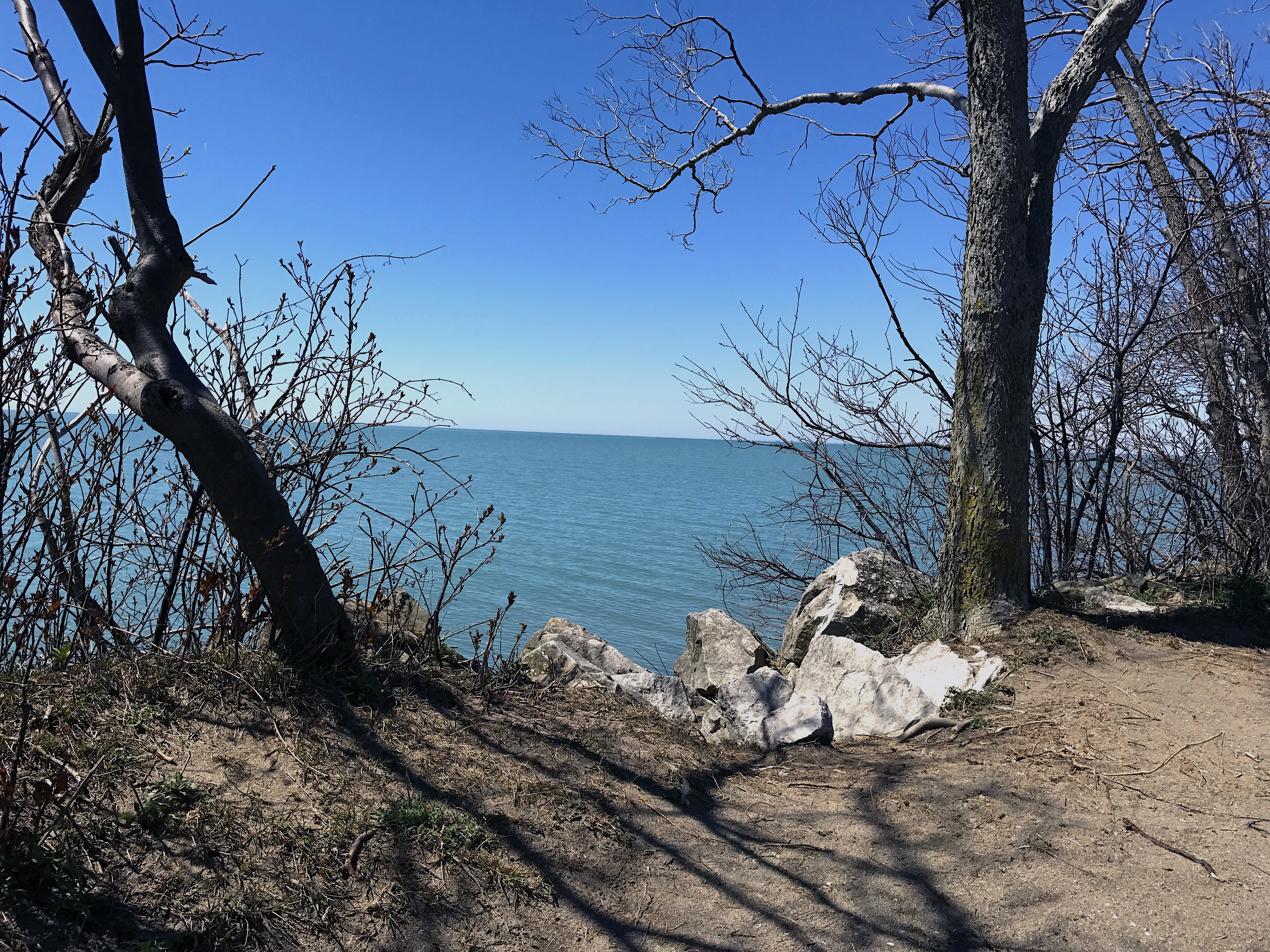
Point Pelee is part of the history of the Caldwell First Nation

== History ==
The Caldwell First Nation, sometimes also called "the Chippewas of Point Pelee and Pelee Island," were a distinct First Nation in the Point Pelee area since before 1763.

Their traditional territory encompassed a broad area corresponding to what is now the Ontario region, extending from the Detroit River along Amherstburg to Long Point, Ontario, and the Lake Erie Islands. The heart of their ancestral territory includes the Essex and Kent county areas, in particular, the Point Pelee Peninsula and Pelee Island. The Caldwell First Nation considers Point Pelee as "our home" and the neighboring Walpole Island First Nation considers Point Pelee as part of "our house."

The Caldwell First Nation served as allies of the British during the War of 1812. In consideration of this service, they were promised land at Point Pelee. The First Nation continued to occupy Point Pelee, with the support of the Canadian government, up until the late 1850s. In the 1920s, many of the band members were forced out of Point Pelee when the Royal Canadian Mounted Police, along with local law enforcement agencies, burned their homes in the area in an effort to force them from their traditional lands.

The name Caldwell derives from William Caldwell (ranger), likely via his son Billy Caldwell who was a Captain in the British Indian Department. Billy was the issue of a union between Irish-born William Caldwell and a native woman who is most often referred to as Mohawk. Billy led native troops during the War of 1812.

== Land claim ==
In May 1790, representatives of certain Odawa, Ojibwa, Potawatomi, and Huron (Wendat) surrendered a large tract of land in southwestern Ontario, including Point Pelee. However, the Caldwell First Nation neither signed nor benefited from that treaty. The Crown did not realize this, and it was publicly acknowledged by the Department of Indian and Northern Affairs Canada. Caldwell First Nation Council members settled the land claim that had been outstanding for more than 220 years.

For decades, the Caldwell First Nation was the only federally recognized First Nation in southern Ontario without a reserve land of its own. The Nation has been working towards establishing a reserve, which will finally give members the land base. In November 2020, the Caldwell First Nation took possession of an 80-hectare property in Leamington, Ontario, for a reserve. They also opened a gas station in April 2023.
