= XHTR-FM =

Radio station in Villahermosa, Tabasco

- Villahermosa, Tabasco; Mexico
- Frequency: 92.5 MHz
- Branding: La Poderosa

Programming
- Format: Regional Mexican

Ownership
- Owner: Grupo Radiorama; (Radiodifusora XHTR-FM, S.A. de C.V.)
- Operator: Grupo AS Comunicación
- Sister stations: XHREC-FM, XHVHT-FM

History
- First air date: August 1, 1997

Technical information
- ERP: 14.49 kW

Links
- Webcast: Listen live
- Website: https://grupoasradio.com/estacion?sigla=XHTR

XHTR-FM is a radio station on 92.5 FM in Villahermosa, Tabasco, Mexico. It is owned by Grupo Radiorama and operated by Grupo AS Comunicación and carries its La Poderosa Regional Mexican format.

== History ==
XHTR received its concession on February 26, 1996, and began broadcasting August 1, 1997. It has always been owned by Radiorama.
