= WERR =

Radio station in Vega Alta–San Juan, Puerto Rico

- Vega Alta, Puerto Rico; Puerto Rico
- Broadcast area: San Juan, Puerto Rico
- Frequency: 104.1 MHz
- Branding: 104.1/104.3 FM Redentor

Programming
- Format: Contemporary Christian

Ownership
- Owner: WERR Radio Redentor; (Radio Redentor, Inc.)

History
- First air date: April 27, 1970; 56 years ago
- Former call signs: WUPR-FM (1970–1975)

Technical information
- Licensing authority: FCC
- Facility ID: 54750
- Class: B
- ERP: 50,000 watts
- HAAT: 804.0 meters (2,637.8 ft)
- Transmitter coordinates: 18°17′29″N 66°39′40.5″W
- Repeater: 104.3 WZER (Charlotte Amalie, United States Virgin Islands)

Links
- Public license information: Public file; LMS
- Website: redentor104fm.com

WERR (104.1 FM), branded on-air as 104.1/104.3 FM Redentor, is a radio station broadcasting a Contemporary Christian format. Licensed to Vega Alta, Puerto Rico, it serves the Puerto Rico area. and is owned by WERR Radio Redentor, Inc. The station is the first Christian radio station in Puerto Rico.

The station is relayed through booster stations, WERR-FM1 in Caguas and WERR-FM2 in Yauco, and WERR-FM3 in Mayaguez three of them operating at 104.1 FM. The station also rebroadcasts on WZER (104.3 FM) in Charlotte Amalie, covering the U.S. Virgin Islands.

Previous logo
