= XHTVH-FM =

Public radio station in Villahermosa, Tabasco

XHTVH-FM/XHTQE-FM

Villahermosa, Tabasco Tenosique.; Mexico
- Frequency: 94.9 MHz/102.9 MHz
- Branding: Mega 94.9

Programming
- Format: Pop/news

Ownership
- Owner: Gobierno del Estado de Tabasco
- Sister stations: XETVH-AM

History
- First air date: 1992/2011
- Call sign meaning: XHTVH: Tabasco VillaHermosa; XHTQE: TenosiQuE

Technical information
- ERP: XHTVH: 50 kW; XHTQE: 15 kW
- Transmitter coordinates: 17°58′07″N 92°56′01.6″W

Links
- Website: corat.mx/mega-94-9fm/

XHTVH-FM is a radio station on 94.9 FM in Villahermosa, Tabasco, in Mexico. It is part of the state government's Radio and Television Commission (CORAT) and is known as Mega 94.9.

XHTVH is relayed to XHTQE-FM 102.9 in Tenosique.

== History ==
XHTVH began operations first, coming to life as part of a seven-station FM permit awarded to the state government in 1992. XHTVH was the only one of the seven stations to make it to air and the most powerful of any of the stations permitted at that time.

XHTQE received its permit in December 2011.
