= WXRW-LP =

Milwaukee, Wisconsin; United States
- Frequency: 104.1 MHz
- Branding: Riverwest Radio

Programming
- Format: Community radio
- Affiliations: Pacifica Radio Network

Ownership
- Owner: Riverwest Artists Association, Inc.

History
- First air date: January 1, 2016
- Call sign meaning: "Where the World Experiences Riverwest "

Technical information
- Licensing authority: FCC
- Facility ID: 195569
- Class: L1
- ERP: 100 watts
- HAAT: 15 meters (49 ft)
- Transmitter coordinates: 43.4°N 87.54°W

Links
- Public license information: LMS
- Website: www.riverwestradio.com

WXRW-LP (104.1 FM), branded as "Riverwest Radio", is a non-commercial low-power FM radio station licensed to Milwaukee, Wisconsin. The station is owned by Riverwest Artists Association, Inc.

The station airs a community-oriented, mostly talk radio-based format. All shows are local, aside from the syndicated Democracy Now.

== History ==
After several years as an online webcaster, WXRW-LP debuted on the airwaves on January 1, 2016.
