= CIOT-FM =

Christian radio station in Nipawin, Saskatchewan

- Nipawin, Saskatchewan; Canada
- Frequency: 104.1 MHz
- Branding: Lighthouse FM

Programming
- Format: Christian radio

Ownership
- Owner: Wilderness Ministries Inc.

History
- First air date: 2004

Technical information
- Licensing authority: CRTC
- ERP: 200 watts
- HAAT: 25.5 metres (84 ft)
- Transmitter coordinates: 53°19′45″N 104°01′44″W

Links
- Website: www.lighthousefm.ca

CIOT-FM is a Canadian radio station that broadcasts a Christian music format at 104.1 FM in Nipawin, Saskatchewan. The station is branded as Lighthouse 104.1 and is owned by Wilderness Ministries Inc.

CIOT began broadcasting in 2004.

== See also ==
- Christian radio
