= Manuel Bartlett Bautista =

Mexican journalist, politician and judge

Governor of Tabasco
- In office January 1, 1953 – March 22, 1955
- Preceded by: Francisco J. Santamaría
- Succeeded by: Miguel Orrico de los Llanos

Personal details
- Born: December 23, 1894 Tenosique, Tabasco
- Died: April 24, 1963 (aged 68) Mexico City
- Party: Partido Revolucionario Institucional
- Spouse: Isabel Díaz Castilla
- Occupation: Lawyer, jurist

Manuel Bartlett Bautista (December 23, 1894, in Tenosique, Tabasco – April 24, 1963, in Mexico City) was a Mexican journalist, lawyer, judge, and politician who served as Governor of the State of Tabasco for two years, before being pressured to resign.

== Biography ==
Manuel Bartlett Bautista was born in Tenosique to Gabriel Bartlett Cámara, a businessman of partial Cornish descent, and Teodora Bautista Pérez. He completed his primary studies in Tenosique and his secondary studies there and at the Mexican Methodist Institute of Puebla. From 1909 to 1915 he lived in Villahermosa, then known as San Juan Bautista de la Villa Hermosa, studying at the Instituto Juárez while also agitating through revolutionary circles. In 1913 Bartlett helped found and became President of the Juárez Institute's Free Student Association, but ended up being expelled from the school after leading a protest against Huerta's assassination of President Madero. While at the Universidad Nacional Autónoma de México he worked as editor of the student newspaper El Estudiante, graduating with a degree in law in 1920.

Bartlett returned to Villahermosa that same year and taught for a brief time at his old school, the Instituto Juárez. He also served as syndic in the Ayuntamiento del Centro (City Council) and President of the Committee of Public Health. From 1921-22 he served as a deputy to the Congress of the State of Tabasco. From 1920 to 1929 he held various legal and governmental positions, including consulting lawyer to the City Council of Mexico City (1920); public defender to the military (1922); consulting lawyer to the Secretariat of Finance and Public Credit (1924–28); and chief of the legal department of the same (1929). After a decade working in different district-judicial capacities Bartlett was made a Justice of the Mexican Supreme Court, position which he would hold from 1941 to 1951.

In 1953, after three previously unsuccessful attempts, Bartlett obtained the PRI's nomination for the governorship of Tabasco, a decision which, owing to the party's virtual monopoly on power, all but assured him the office. However, as a result of intra-party struggles combined with civil unrest in the state, Bartlett fell out of favor with the Adolfo Ruiz Cortines administration and was pressured to leave the post before the conclusion of his term. On March 22, 1955, Bartlett asked for and was granted a leave of absence by the State Congress, effectively ending his governorship.

Bartlett was married to Isabel Díaz Castilla, niece of famed poet and insurgent Salvador Díaz Mirón. His son Manuel Bartlett Díaz is a high PRI official and former governor of Puebla. Manuel Bartlett Bautista died on April 24, 1963, and is buried in Mexico City.

== Published works ==
(list not comprehensive)

- La defensa como procuración. 1920
- El pocho, cojoes, tigres y pochoveras: interesantes y curiosas costumbres tradicionales de Tenosique, Tab. 1926
- La cuestión electoral tabasqueña (1923-1926). 1954

== Bibliography ==
- (English) Camp, Roderic Ai, Mexican political biographies, 1935-1993. The Hague: Mouton, 1993.
- (Spanish) Peralta Burelo, Francisco, Gobernadores de Tabasco separados del cargo, 1935-1987. Villahermosa, Tab.: Universidad Juárez Autónoma de Tabasco, 1988.
