= WPVM (FM) =

Simulcasts WRVM, Suring
- Sturgeon Bay, Wisconsin; United States
- Broadcast area: Door County
- Frequency: 88.5 MHz

Programming
- Format: Christian radio

Ownership
- Owner: WRVM, Inc.
- Sister stations: WRVM; WMVM; WHJL; WYVM; WXVM

History
- First air date: July 1998
- Former call signs: WAZM (1998); WRGX (1998–2008); WNLI (2008–2014)
- Call sign meaning: disambiguation of WRVM's calls

Technical information
- Licensing authority: FCC
- Facility ID: 85042
- Class: C2
- ERP: 15,000 watts
- HAAT: 158 m (518 ft)
- Transmitter coordinates: 44°54′14″N 87°22′13″W

Links
- Public license information: Public file; LMS
- Website: www.wrvm.org

WPVM FM 88.5 is a radio station broadcasting a Christian radio format. Licensed to Sturgeon Bay, Wisconsin, United States, the station serves the Green Bay area. The station is owned by WRVM, Inc. and operates as a simulcast of WRVM.

== History ==
The station was assigned the call letters WAZM on April 20, 1998, but was never on the air with those calls. On October 9, 1998, the station changed its broadcast callsign to WRGX.

WRGX signed on the air with a format of Christian alternative rock as a complement to sister station WPFF, which features Christian adult contemporary music. As of September 2001, the station was one of 46 radio stations whose plays were recorded by Radio & Records to compile the Christian Rock chart. In April 2006, WRGX dropped its Christian rock format after fundraising goals to keep the format on the air were not met. The station changed to a Southern gospel/Christian country format which remained until after the sale in December 2007 from Family Educational Broadcasting Corporation of Door County, WI, to Bethesda Christian Broadcasting. Following the sale, WRGX changed its calls to WNLI and adopted a format of Christian talk, teaching and inspirational music.

On October 23, 2013, it was announced that WPFF, WNLI and their associated translators would be sold to the Educational Media Foundation, owners of the K-LOVE and Air 1 CCM networks. The sale, at a price of $825,000, was consummated on February 14, 2014.

Prior to the station's purchase by Educational Media Foundation, WNLI was relayed by W245AK, 96.9 is Sheboygan. W245AK currently serves as a translator for WNLI's sister station, K-LOVE affiliate WPFF.

In 2014, Educational Media Foundation sold WNLI to WRVM, Inc. at a price of $240,000. This sale was consummated on October 30, 2014. The station changed its call sign to WPVM on November 10, 2014.
