= Channel 34 virtual TV stations in the United States =

The following television stations operate on virtual channel 34 in the United States:

- K14GW-D in Corvallis, Oregon
- K14MQ-D in Coos Bay, Oregon
- K14PH-D in Baudette, Minnesota
- K14QP-D in Woodward, etc., Oklahoma
- K16JW-D in Ridgecrest, California
- K19GH-D in Eugene, etc., Oregon
- K19KT-D in Hobbs, New Mexico
- K23OS-D in London Springs, Oregon
- K28NZ-D in Florence, Oregon
- K30BN-D in Coos Bay, Oregon
- K30JP-D in Sayre, Oklahoma
- K32FI-D in Yoncalla, Oregon
- K32JL-D in Powers, Oregon
- K32LW-D in Cottage Grove, Oregon
- K34EU-D in Morongo Valley, California
- K34GM-D in Pierre, South Dakota
- K34HO-D in Willmar, Minnesota
- K34IC-D in Glide, Oregon
- K34IN-D in Beaver, Oklahoma
- K34JK-D in Elk City, Oklahoma
- K34MC-D in Williams, Minnesota
- K34MX-D in Odessa, Texas
- K35MS-D in Canyonville, etc., Oregon
- K36IY-D in Weatherford, Oklahoma
- K36NR-D in Seiling, Oklahoma
- K36NV-D in Strong City, Oklahoma
- KACA-LD in Modesto, California
- KBCI-LD in Bonners Ferry, Idaho
- KBRO-LD in Lyons, Colorado
- KCBT-LD in Bakersfield, California
- KCOR-CD in San Antonio, Texas
- KEVA-LD in Boise, Idaho
- KFTU-CD in Tucson, Arizona
- KFVT-LD in Wichita, Kansas
- KGPX-TV in Spokane, Washington
- KIDV-LD in Albany, Texas
- KITU-TV in Beaumont, Texas
- KJJM-LD in Dallas & Mesquite, Texas
- KJTV-TV in Lubbock, Texas
- KLSR-TV in Eugene, Oregon
- KMBA-LD in Austin, Texas
- KMCC in Laughlin, Nevada
- KMEX-DT in Los Angeles, California
- KMJD-LD in Kalispell, Montana
- KOCB in Oklahoma City, Oklahoma
- KSJF-CD in Poteau, Oklahoma
- KTLP-LD in Pueblo, Colorado
- KUVM-CD in Missouri City, Texas
- KWMO-LD in Hot Springs, Arkansas
- KXNW in Eureka Springs, Arkansas
- KXPI-LD in Pocatello, Idaho
- KYDF-LD in Corpus Christi, Texas
- KZCZ-LD in College Station, Texas
- W18ES-D in Mansfield, Ohio
- W18ET-D in Birmingham, Alabama
- W22FA-D in Mayaguez, Puerto Rico
- W27DU-D in Traverse City, Michigan
- W29EW-D in Willsboro, New York
- W33ED-D in Vieques, Puerto Rico
- W34EQ-D in Bangor, Maine
- W34ER-D in Clarksdale, Mississippi
- W34FO-D in Augusta, Georgia
- W34FX-D in Montrose, Georgia
- WACN-LD in Raleigh, North Carolina
- WBGS-LD in Bowling Green, Kentucky
- WNGT-CD in Smithfield-Selma, North Carolina
- WDFX-TV in Ozark, Alabama
- WEDE-CD in Arlington Heights, Illinois
- WHBH-CD in Booneville, Mississippi
- WIDO-LD in Wilmington, North Carolina
- WIVT in Binghamton, New York
- WJHJ-LD in Newport News, etc., Virginia
- WJNK-LD in Nashville, Tennessee
- WKXT-LD in Morristown, Tennessee
- WMPJ-LD in Calhoun City, Mississippi
- WNIT in South Bend, Indiana
- WODH-LD in Jacksonville, Florida
- WOSU-TV in Columbus, Ohio
- WPXO-LD in East Orange, New Jersey
- WQAV-CD in Glassboro, New Jersey
- WRBJ-TV in Magee, Mississippi
- WSCG in Baxley, Georgia
- WTGB-LD in Gainesville, Florida
- WTVX in Fort Pierce, Florida
- WTXX-LD in Springfield, Massachusetts
- WUVG-DT in Athens, Georgia
- WVTT-CD in Olean, New York
- WWTW in Senatobia, Mississippi
- WYOW in Eagle River, Wisconsin

The following stations, which are no longer licensed, formerly operated on virtual channel 34:

- K02RM-D in Wendover, Nevada
- K34KX-D in Rolla, Missouri
- K34KY-D in Mountain Home, Idaho
- K34LR-D in Salinas, California
- KEFB in Ames, Iowa
- KMZM-LD in Cedar Falls, Iowa
- KQLD-LD in Lincoln, Nebraska
- W21EB-D in Clarksburg, West Virginia
- W34ED-D in Trujillo Alto, Puerto Rico
- W34EH-D in Champaign, Illinois
- WBKI-TV in Campbellsville, Kentucky
