= XHOP-FM =

Radio station in Villahermosa, Tabasco, Mexico

- Villahermosa, Tabasco, Mexico; Mexico
- Frequency: 96.5 MHz
- Branding: Vox

Programming
- Format: Adult contemporary
- Affiliations: Radiópolis

Ownership
- Owner: Grupo Radio Cañón; (Radio Cañón, S.A. de C.V.)
- Sister stations: XHSAT-FM XHKV-FM

History
- First air date: August 30, 1979 (concession)

Technical information
- Class: B
- ERP: 50.05 kW

Links
- Webcast: Listen live
- Website: radiocanion.com.mx

XHOP-FM is a radio station in Mexico based in Villahermosa, Tabasco on 96.5 MHz. The station is owned by Grupo Radio Cañón, with Adult contemporary music format.

== History ==
Logo used 2017-2023 with the Amor format

XHOP received its concession on August 30, 1979. It was owned by Salvador García de los Santos and broadcast with 39 kW ERP.

The station was sold to Radio XHOP-FM, S.A. de C.V., in the 1990s, and to Radio Integral (the primary concessionaire for Grupo ACIR) in 2000.

Amor ran on XHOP until December 14, 2023, when Grupo ACIR dropped its formats from the cluster it ran in the market.
