= XHSAT-FM =

Radio station in Villahermosa, Tabasco

- Villahermosa, Tabasco; Mexico
- Frequency: 90.1 MHz
- Branding: La Q

Programming
- Format: Spanish adult hits
- Affiliations: Radiopolis

Ownership
- Owner: Grupo Radio Cañón; (Radio Cañón, S.A. de C.V.)
- Sister stations: XHOP-FM XHKV-FM

History
- First air date: June 6, 1986 (concession)
- Call sign meaning: Letters in the middle of "Villahermosa, Tabasco"

Technical information
- ERP: 15 kW

Links
- Webcast: Listen live
- Website: radiocanion.com.mx

XHSAT-FM is a radio station in Mexico based in Villahermosa, Tabasco on 90.1 MHz, currently carrying the La Q tropical music format from Radiópolis. The station is owned by Grupo Radio Cañón.

== History ==
Logo used 2016-2023 with the Mix format

While it was made available in 1976, XHSAT received its concession on June 6, 1986. It was originally owned by Sergio de la Torre Rangel, who was selected to win the station in 1980. In the 1990s the station became a general format Radio ACIR. In 2000 when Grupo ACIR acquired XHSAT, it began broadcasting the Mix format.

Mix ran on XHSAT until December 14, 2023, when Grupo ACIR dropped its formats from the cluster it ran in the market. The station's ownership passed to Grupo Radio Cañón, with the "La Q" format already used on Mexico City's XEQ-AM.
