= XHREC-FM =

Radio station in Villahermosa, Tabasco, Mexico

- Villahermosa, Tabasco; Mexico
- Frequency: 104.9 MHz
- Branding: Oreja FM

Programming
- Format: Spanish adult hits

Ownership
- Owner: Grupo Radiorama; (Radiodifusora XEREC-AM, S.A. de C.V.)
- Operator: Grupo AS Comunicación
- Sister stations: XHTR-FM, XHVHT-FM

History
- First air date: April 25, 1991 (concession)
- Former call signs: XEREC-AM
- Former frequencies: 940 kHz
- Call sign meaning: "Reforma, Chiapas"

Technical information
- Class: B1
- ERP: 25 kW
- Transmitter coordinates: 17°58′41″N 92°59′03″W

Links
- Webcast: Listen live
- Website: grupoasradio.com

XHREC-FM is a radio station on 104.9 FM in Villahermosa, Tabasco, Mexico. It is owned by Grupo Radiorama and carries a Spanish-language adult hits format known as Oreja FM.

== History ==
XEREC-AM 940 received its concession on April 25, 1991. It was originally located in Reforma, Chiapas, about 26 kilometres (16 mi) southwest of Villahermosa. By 2002 it had moved into Tabasco, initially operating as Mariachi Estéreo. In mid-2004, XEREC adopted the W Radio news/talk network. On September 17, 2008, XEREC and XEVHT-AM 1270 swapped formats, and XEREC became a romantic station known as Romántica.

XEREC migrated to FM in 2010, continuing in the romantic format. The station tweaked its name to Vida Romántica in 2017. On April 1, 2021, the station changed to Heraldo Radio news-talk network, which had briefly been heard on XHRVI-FM 106.3. On April 1, 2022, Heraldo Radio dropped eight stations, including XHREC, as affiliates; this station then became La Mexicana with a Regional Mexican format. The name was short-lived in Villahermosa, changing to La Rancherita in September to avoid confusion with XHLI-FM 98.3 already known as Radio Mexicana. On August 5, 2024, La Rancherita went from XHREC to XHVHT-FM to make way for La Lupe from Multimedios Radio.
