= CHY FM =

Coffs Harbour; Australia
- Broadcast area: Coffs Harbour
- Frequency: 104.1 MHz FM
- Branding: CHY FM

Programming
- Format: Community, Youth

History
- First air date: 1 December 1973
- Call sign meaning: Coffs Harbour Youth

Technical information
- Transmitter coordinates: 30.30228°S 153.118896°E

CHY FM is a youth-run community radio station located in Coffs Harbour, New South Wales.

== History ==
The idea of a youth-run community radio station in Coffs Harbour came from Captain John Townsend, a member of the Salvation Army. Townsend realised the success this concept could be. After donations from businesses from across Coffs Harbour, the station launched on 1 December 1973. Since 1973, more than 4000 young people from the Coffs Harbour region have been through CHY FM. The station celebrated its 40th anniversary in 2013.
