= XHEPAR-FM =

Radio station in Villahermosa, Tabasco, Mexico

Villahermosa, Tabasco; Mexico
- Frequency: 101.5 MHz
- Branding: Los 40

Programming
- Format: Pop
- Affiliations: Radiópolis

Ownership
- Owner: Radio Núcleo; (Radio Promotora de Tabasco, S.A. de C.V.)
- Sister stations: XHQQQ-FM, XHVB-FM

History
- First air date: June 8, 1993 (AM); November 30, 2010 (FM)
- Former call signs: XEFRO-AM, XEPAR-AM
- Former frequencies: 1320 kHz
- Call sign meaning: "Paraíso, Tabasco"

Technical information
- ERP: 25 kW
- Transmitter coordinates: 17°56′05.7″N 92°58′08.5″W

Links
- Website: radionucleo.com/player/los40villa/

XHEPAR-FM is a radio station on 101.5 FM in Villahermosa, Tabasco, Mexico. The station is owned by Radio Núcleo and carries the Los 40 pop format from Radiópolis.

== History ==
XHEPAR began as XEFRO-AM 1320 in Frontera, Tabasco. It was owned by Raúl Estrada Tsuru and received its concession on June 8, 1993. The station was known as "Radio Frontera". In the late 1990s, it moved to Paraíso, Tabasco, also changing its call sign to XEPAR-AM, and became "La Buena".

In the mid-2000s, it moved again, this time to Villahermosa. It was authorized to move to FM in 2010 and came to air in November the same year, upon migration, XHEPAR became a Los 40 franchise pop format.

On January 1, 2020, Radio Núcleo handed over operation of its three Villahermosa stations to Grupo Radio Comunicación, with resulting format and name changes for all three; XHEPAR became "Estéreo Joven", retaining a pop format. After nine months, Radio Núcleo resumed direct operations and announced the return of the previous Los 40 franchise format.
