= XHVB-FM =

Radio station in Villahermosa, Tabasco, Mexico

- Villahermosa, Tabasco; Mexico
- Frequency: 97.3 FM
- Branding: Extremo FM

Programming
- Format: Regional Mexican

Ownership
- Owner: Radio Núcleo; (Super Stereo de Tabasco, S.A. de C.V.)
- Sister stations: XHQQQ-FM, XHEPAR-FM

History
- First air date: October 9, 1979 (concession)

Technical information
- Class: B1
- ERP: 14.291 kW
- Transmitter coordinates: 17°56′08.0″N 92°58′08.6″W

Links
- Webcast: Listen live
- Website: radionucleo.com

XHVB-FM is a radio station on 97.3 FM in Villahermosa, Tabasco. It is owned by Radio Núcleo and carries a Regional Mexican format known as Extremo FM.

== History ==
XHVB received its concession on October 9, 1979. It was owned by Eduardo León del Río and was known as Super Stereo. It was sold to its current concessionaire in 2000 and rebranded as Extremo.

On January 1, 2020, Radio Núcleo handed over operation of its three Villahermosa stations to Grupo Radio Comunicación, with resulting format and name changes for all three. XHVB adopted a romantic format as "Inolvidable".

After nine months, in October 2020, Radio Núcleo resumed direct operations; while a return to their prior formats was announced for the other two stations, XHVB-FM was instead announced to be picking up the Radiópolis "Vox Love Station" romantic format. Which would later change to the current one, Vox FM Radio Hits, an adult contemporary music format. On April 22, 2025, they abandoned the Vox FM brand and the Extremo brand returned with Regional Mexican format adopted.
