= XHVHT-FM =

Radio station in Villahermosa, Tabasco, Mexico

Villahermosa, Tabasco; Mexico
- Frequency: 99.1 MHz
- Branding: La Rancherita

Programming
- Format: Regional Mexican

Ownership
- Owner: Radiorama; (Radiodifusora XEVHT-AM, S.A. de C.V.)
- Operator: Grupo AS Comunicación
- Sister stations: XHTR-FM, XHREC-FM

History
- First air date: September 30, 1992 (concession)
- Call sign meaning: "Villahermosa, Tabasco"

Technical information
- ERP: 25 kW
- Transmitter coordinates: 17°58′41″N 92°59′03″W

Links
- Website: orejafm.com radiorama.mx

XHVHT-FM is a radio station on 99.1 FM in Villahermosa, Tabasco, Mexico. It is owned by Grupo Radiorama, It is operated by Grupo AS Comunicación and carries Regional Mexican format known as La Rancherita.

== History ==
XEVHT-AM 1270 received its concession on September 30, 1992. It has always been owned by Radiorama beginning with the name of "Romántica 1270". In mid-2004 it began to broadcast as "Bésame 1270" repeating the signal generated from the pilot station XEQ-AM in Mexico City. In July 2008, a new stage began in XEVHT, when it resumed the format of Romántica 1270. As of September 17, 2008, XEVHT and XEREC-AM 940 swapped formats and became a franchise W Radio news/talk network.

XEVHT migrated to FM in 2010. In 2015 it became the pop/hits format @FM (Arroba FM). On July 4, 2021, Arroba FM ended to make way for Oreja FM. On August 5, 2024, XHVHT switched from Oreja FM to La Rancherita, which had been the format on XHREC-FM.
