= XHQQQ-FM =

Radio station in Villahermosa, Tabasco, Mexico

- Villahermosa, Tabasco; Mexico
- Frequency: 89.3 MHz
- Branding: La Ke Buena

Programming
- Format: Regional Mexican
- Affiliations: Radiópolis

Ownership
- Owner: Radio Núcleo; (Triple Q Radio, S.A. de C.V.)
- Sister stations: XHVB-FM, XHEPAR-FM

History
- First air date: April 21, 1978 (AM); November 1, 2010 (FM)
- Former frequencies: 1340 kHz, 880 kHz

Technical information
- ERP: 25 kW
- Transmitter coordinates: 17°56′05.7″N 92°58′08.5″W

Links
- Website: radionucleo.com/player/kebuenavilla/

XHQQQ-FM is a radio station on 89.3 FM in Villahermosa, Tabasco. The station is owned by Radio Núcleo and carries the La Ke Buena Regional Mexican format from Radiópolis.

== History ==
XHQQQ began as XEQQQ-AM 1340 transmitting from Teapa, Tabasco, and received its concession on April 21, 1978. It changed to 880 kHz when it was moved to Villahermosa. The station was known as Triple Q and later Súper Q with Regional Mexican formats.

In October 2010, the station became a franchise of the national Ke Buena format from what was then known as Televisa Radio. This preceded the launch of XHQQQ-FM 89.3 on November 1, 2010.

On January 1, 2020, Radio Núcleo handed over operation of its three Villahermosa stations to Grupo Radio Comunicación, with resulting format and name changes for all three; XHQQQ remained in the Regional Mexican format as "Fiesta Mexicana". After nine months, Radio Núcleo resumed direct operations and announced the return of the previous La Ke Buena franchise format.
