= KMSN (FM) =

Radio station in Mason, Texas

- Mason, Texas; United States
- Broadcast area: Harper, Texas; Brady, Texas
- Frequency: 104.1 MHz
- Branding: Sun Radio

Programming
- Format: Texas-focused Americana

Ownership
- Owner: Township Media, LLC

History
- Call sign meaning: K MaSoN

Technical information
- Licensing authority: FCC
- Facility ID: 198632
- Class: C3
- ERP: 25,000 watts
- HAAT: 96 metres (315 ft)
- Transmitter coordinates: 30°46′35″N 99°17′54″W

Links
- Public license information: Public file; LMS
- Webcast: Listen Live
- Website: Official Website

KMSN (104.1 FM) is a radio station licensed to serve the community of Mason, Texas. The station is owned by Township Media, LLC. It airs an Americana radio format focused on Texas artists.

The station was assigned the KMSN call letters by the Federal Communications Commission on December 22, 2015.
