= Suring, Wisconsin =

- Village
- Location of Suring in Oconto County, Wisconsin.
- Coordinates: 45°0′0″N 88°22′28″W
- Country: United States
- State: Wisconsin
- County: Oconto

Area
  - Total: 1.03 sq mi (2.66 km^{2})
  - Land: 1.03 sq mi (2.66 km^{2})
  - Water: 0 sq mi (0.00 km^{2})
- Elevation: 801 ft (244 m)

Population (2020)
  - Total: 517
  - Density: 503/sq mi (194/km^{2})
- Time zone: UTC-6 (Central (CST))
  - Summer (DST): UTC-5 (CDT)
- Area code: 920
- FIPS code: 55-78725
- GNIS feature ID: 1580561
- Website: ci.suring.wi.us

Suring is a village in Oconto County, Wisconsin, United States, along the 45th parallel. The population was 517 at the 2020 census. It is part of the Green Bay Metropolitan Statistical Area.

== History ==
This area lies within the traditional homeland of the Menominee, who lived here for millennia before European arrival. After years of negotiations with the Ho-Chunk and the United States government about how to accommodate the incoming populations of Oneida, Stockbridge-Munsee, and Brothertown peoples following their removal from New York, the Menominee signed the 1836 Treaty of the Cedars and ceded this territory to the United States. Following this land cession, white settlement could begin. A post office called Suring has been in operation since 1897. The village was named in English for Julius "Joe" Suring (July 30, 1851‒August 15, 1920), a local landowner. In the Menominee language, it is known as Naeqniw-Sīpiah 'three rivers'.

The Village of Suring was originally named Mudville due to low, swampy land that dominated the area. Much of the early business in Suring was from lumberjacks, coming to and from camps north and west of Suring.

Suring was mentioned in at least one national publication due to an incident concerning to parents where the Suring Public Schools superintendent and other administrators were alleged to have conducted multiple strip searches of both boys and girls in an effort to find hidden vaping devices. After the Oconto County district attorney declined to press charges, several parents hired a civil rights attorney to explore possible litigation against the school board.

== Geography ==
Suring is located at 45°0′0″N 88°22′28″W (45.000016, -88.374481). Suring is located 50.5 miles northwest of Green Bay.

According to the United States Census Bureau, the village has a total area of 1.01 square miles (2.62 km^{2}), all land. The Oconto River and Peshtigo Brook define its boundaries on the Southwest.

The village stresses its location on the 45th parallel north with a marker, placing it halfway between the equator and the North Pole.

Wisconsin Highway 32, conjoined with County highway M, passes through the village.

=== Climate ===
Climate data for Suring, Wisconsin (1991–2020 normals, extremes 1959–present)
Month	Jan	Feb	Mar	Apr	May	Jun	Jul	Aug	Sep	Oct	Nov	Dec	Year
Record high °F (°C)	56 (13)	67 (19)	81 (27)	91 (33)	92 (33)	100 (38)	101 (38)	99 (37)	95 (35)	90 (32)	74 (23)	62 (17)	101 (38)
Mean daily maximum °F (°C)	23.8 (−4.6)	28.4 (−2.0)	39.9 (4.4)	53.0 (11.7)	66.1 (18.9)	74.8 (23.8)	78.8 (26.0)	77.2 (25.1)	69.5 (20.8)	56.4 (13.6)	41.6 (5.3)	28.9 (−1.7)	53.2 (11.8)
Daily mean °F (°C)	14.4 (−9.8)	17.6 (−8.0)	29.0 (−1.7)	41.6 (5.3)	54.1 (12.3)	63.6 (17.6)	67.6 (19.8)	66.1 (18.9)	58.1 (14.5)	45.7 (7.6)	33.0 (0.6)	20.9 (−6.2)	42.6 (5.9)
Mean daily minimum °F (°C)	5.1 (−14.9)	6.9 (−13.9)	18.1 (−7.7)	30.2 (−1.0)	42.2 (5.7)	52.3 (11.3)	56.4 (13.6)	55.0 (12.8)	46.7 (8.2)	34.9 (1.6)	24.3 (−4.3)	12.8 (−10.7)	32.1 (0.1)
Record low °F (°C)	−41 (−41)	−44 (−42)	−39 (−39)	−3 (−19)	12 (−11)	26 (−3)	28 (−2)	29 (−2)	16 (−9)	8 (−13)	−16 (−27)	−29 (−34)	−44 (−42)
Average precipitation inches (mm)	1.34 (34)	1.13 (29)	1.79 (45)	2.89 (73)	3.43 (87)	4.22 (107)	4.06 (103)	3.23 (82)	3.47 (88)	2.82 (72)	2.01 (51)	1.69 (43)	32.08 (815)
Average snowfall inches (cm)	11.6 (29)	13.3 (34)	8.8 (22)	6.3 (16)	0.1 (0.25)	0.0 (0.0)	0.0 (0.0)	0.0 (0.0)	0.0 (0.0)	0.6 (1.5)	2.3 (5.8)	13.6 (35)	56.6 (144)
Average precipitation days (≥ 0.01 in)	9.0	7.1	7.7	10.7	12.0	11.8	10.3	9.8	9.7	10.6	7.9	9.0	115.6
Average snowy days (≥ 0.1 in)	7.8	6.9	4.2	2.4	0.0	0.0	0.0	0.0	0.0	0.5	2.3	7.1	31.2
Source: NOAA

== Demographics ==
Historical population
Census	Pop.	Note	%±
1920	294		—
1930	421		43.2%
1940	437		3.8%
1950	546		24.9%
1960	513		−6.0%
1970	499		−2.7%
1980	581		16.4%
1990	626		7.7%
2000	605		−3.4%
2010	544		−10.1%
2020	517		−5.0%
U.S. Decennial Census

=== 2010 census ===
As of the census of 2010, there were 544 people, 232 households, and 133 families living in the village. The population density was 538.6 inhabitants per square mile (208.0/km^{2}). There were 268 housing units at an average density of 265.3 per square mile (102.4/km^{2}). The racial makeup of the village was 90.4% White, 6.4% Native American, 0.9% from other races, and 2.2% from two or more races. Hispanic or Latino of any race were 1.7% of the population.

There were 232 households, of which 31.9% had children under the age of 18 living with them, 39.2% were married couples living together, 14.7% had a female householder with no husband present, 3.4% had a male householder with no wife present, and 42.7% were non-families. 39.2% of all households were made up of individuals, and 22.4% had someone living alone who was 65 years of age or older. The average household size was 2.17 and the average family size was 2.86.

The median age in the village was 43.2 years. 24.6% of residents were under the age of 18; 4.8% were between the ages of 18 and 24; 22.7% were from 25 to 44; 22.8% were from 45 to 64; and 25.2% were 65 years of age or older. The gender makeup of the village was 46.1% male and 53.9% female.

=== 2000 census ===
As of the census of 2000, there were 605 people, 252 households, and 147 families living in the village. The population density was 595.1 people per square mile (229.0/km^{2}). There were 269 housing units at an average density of 264.6 per square mile (101.8/km^{2}). The racial makeup of the village was 98.02% White, 0.17% African American, 1.32% Native American, 0.17% from other races, and 0.33% from two or more races. Hispanic or Latino of any race were 0.17% of the population.

There were 252 households, out of which 29.8% had children under the age of 18, 43.7% were married couples living together, 9.9% had a female householder with no husband present, and 41.3% were non-families. 36.9% of all households were made up of individuals, and 19.8% had someone living alone who was 65 years of age or older. The average household size was 2.17 and the average family size was 2.81.

In the village, the population was spread out, with 22.6% under the age of 18, 8.6% from 18 to 24, 23.1% from 25 to 44, 18.0% from 45 to 64, and 27.6% who were 65 years of age or older. The median age was 42 years. For every 100 females, there were 80.1 males. For every 100 females age 18 and over, there were 77.9 males.

The median income for a household in the village was $26,023, and the median income for a family was $38,125. Males had a median income of $28,182 versus $20,903 for females. The per capita income for the village was $14,230. About 10.5% of families and 12.4% of the population were below the poverty line, including 17.4% of those under age 18 and 9.3% of those age 65 or over.

== Gallery ==
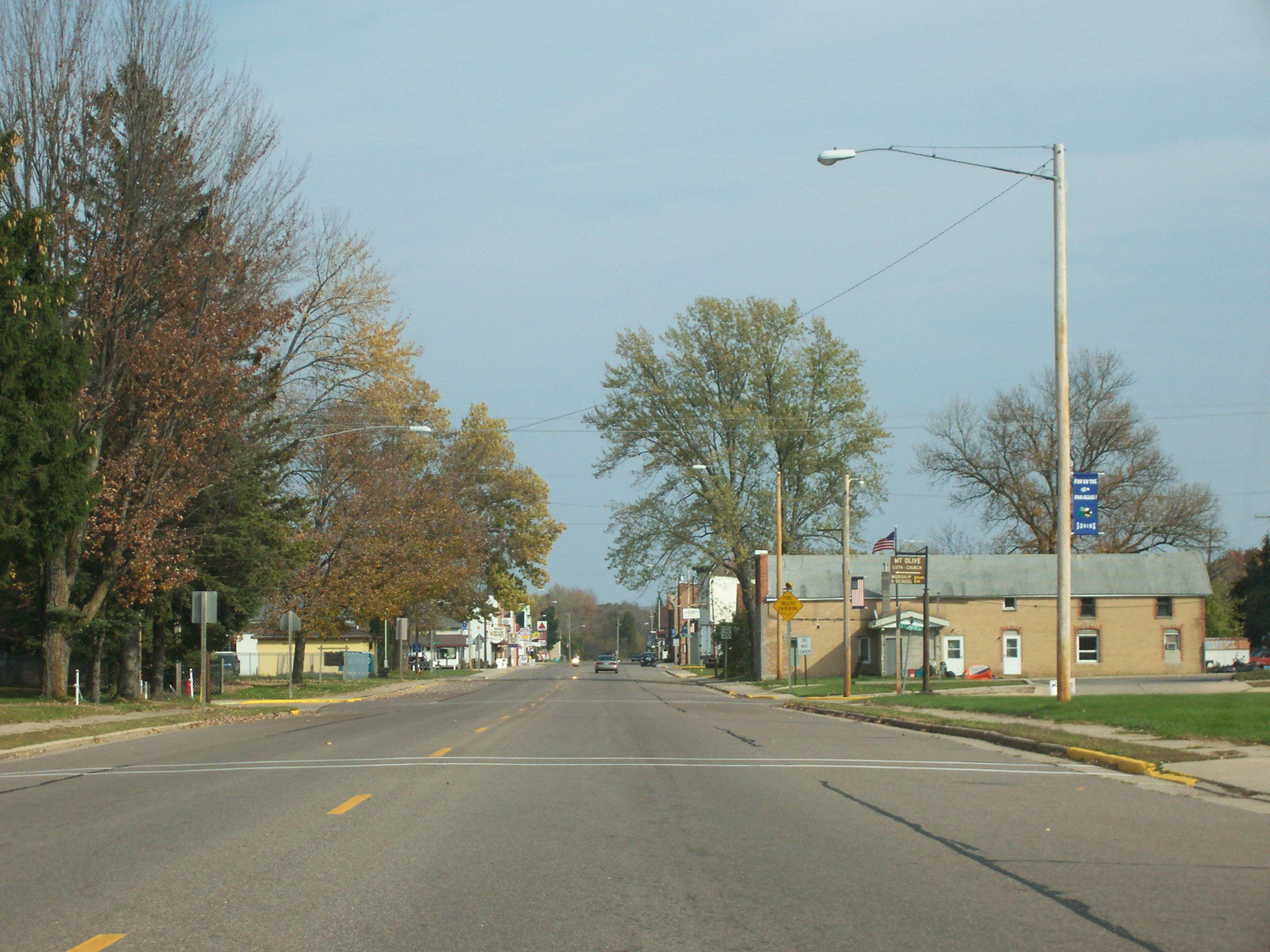
Downtown Suring

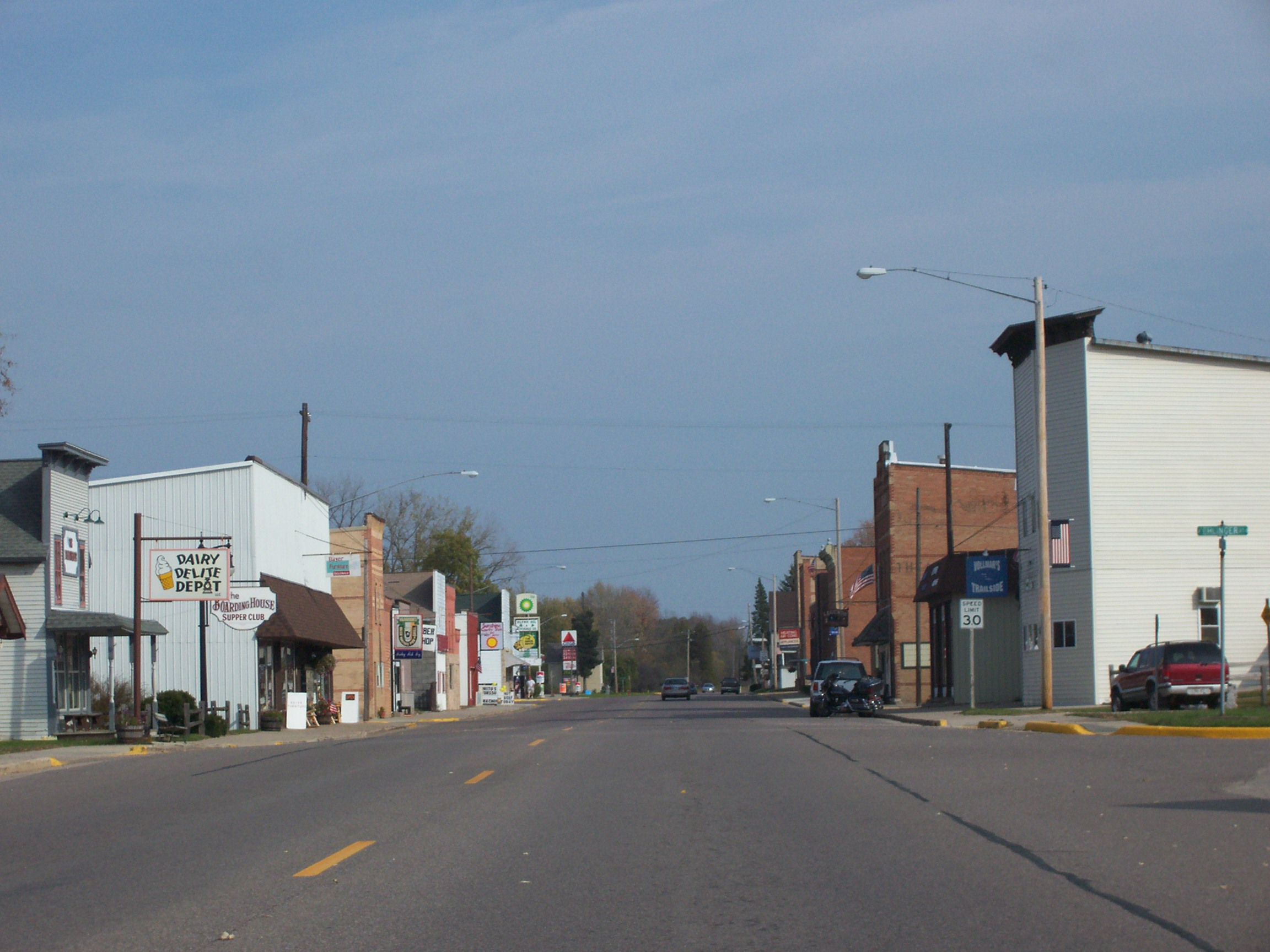
Downtown Suring

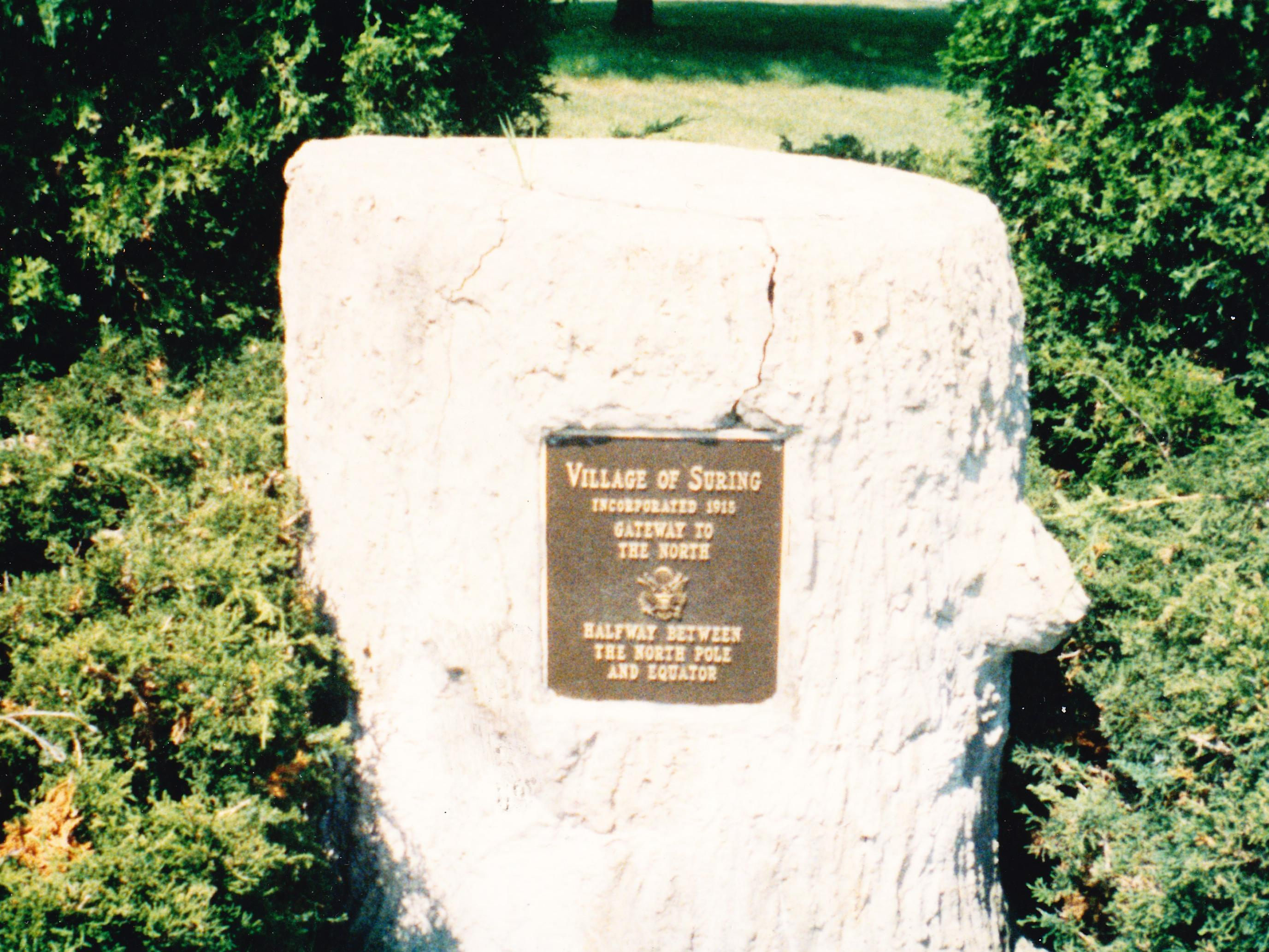
Geographic marker

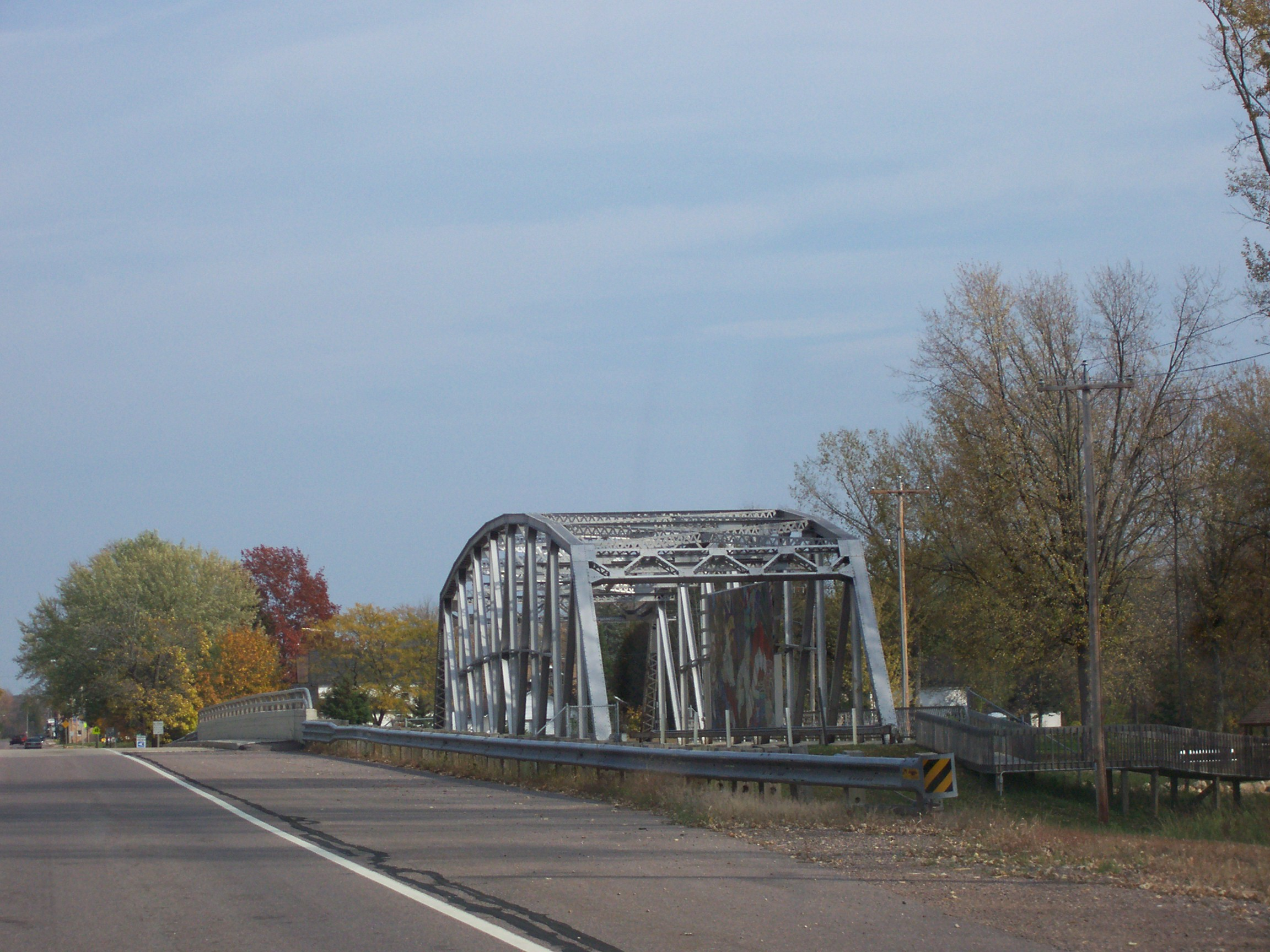
Bridge
