= Tenosique =

Town in the Mexican state of Tabasco

- City
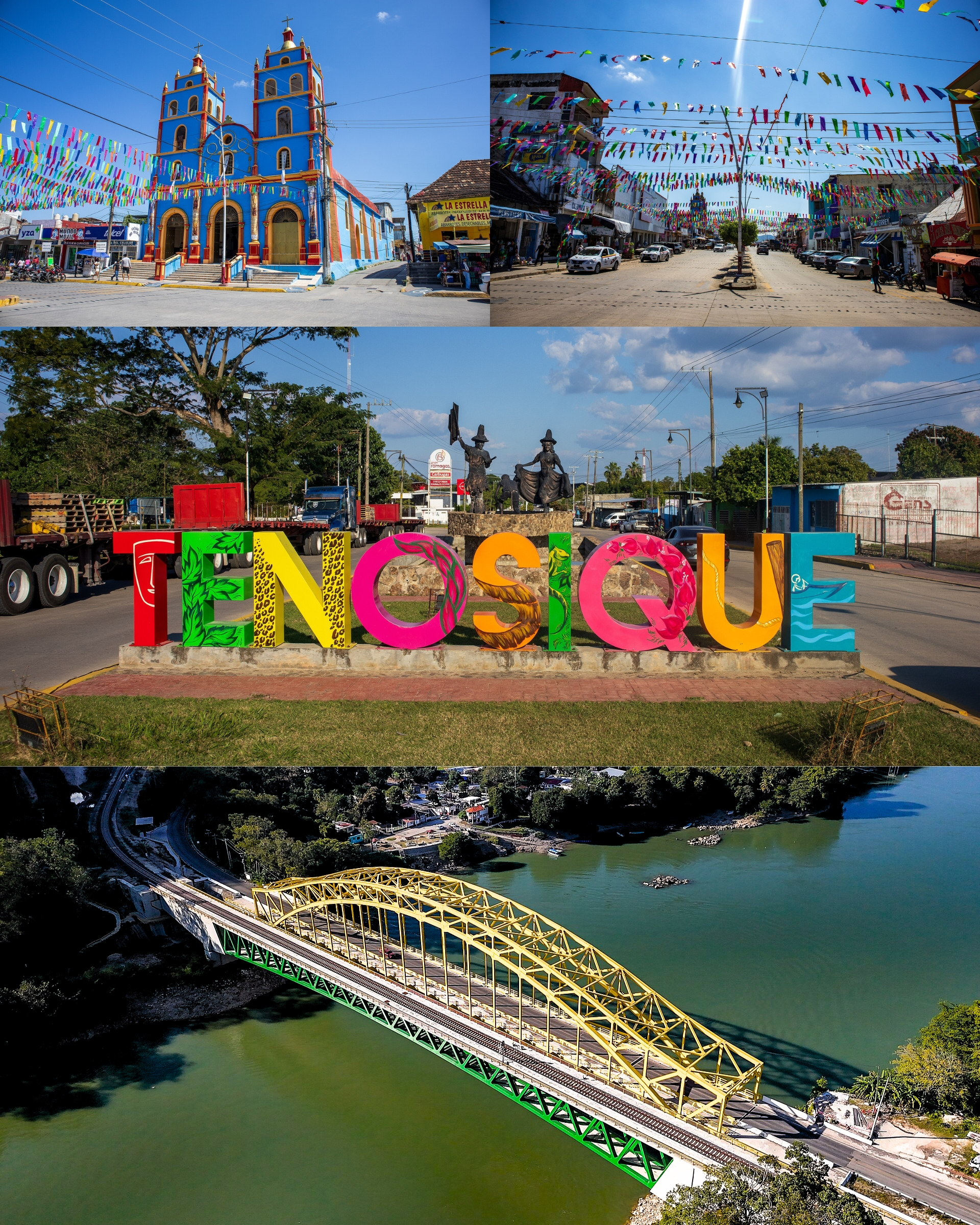

- Location in Tabasco Tenosique (Mexico)
- Country: Mexico
- State: Tabasco
- Municipality: Tenosique

Area
  - Total: 13 km^{2} (5.0 sq mi)

Population (2020)
  - Total: 34,946
  - Density: 2,700/km^{2} (7,000/sq mi)
- Time zone: UTC-6 (Zona Centro)

Tenosique is a town located in Tenosique Municipality in the southeastern corner of the state of Tabasco, in Mexico. Its official name is Tenosique de Pino Suárez. The town had a 2020 census population of 34,946 inhabitants (the fourth-largest community in the state after Villahermosa, Cárdenas, and Comalcalco), while the municipality had a population of 62,310.

== Etymology ==
From the Maya words "Tana" or house and "tsiic" weaving or counting threads. Which leaves us with "casa de los hilanderos " or "House of Weavers or thread counters".

== History ==
Tenosique was founded c. 1000 B.C. in the Preclassic Maya Period (according to Magnolia Paz Nexo in her book Tenosique Prehispánico y Colonial edited by the Government of Tabasco). Since then Tenosique has been occupied uninterruptedly. Vice President and national hero of the Revolution, José María Pino Suárez was born in Tenosique in 1869, and the town now bears his name.

== Geography ==
Tenosique is on the Usumacinta River, downstream from where the river emerges from the Cañón del Usumacinta onto the plains of Tabasco.

=== Climate ===
Climate data for Tenosique de Pino Suárez
Month	Jan	Feb	Mar	Apr	May	Jun	Jul	Aug	Sep	Oct	Nov	Dec	Year
Mean daily maximum °C (°F)	28.3 (82.9)	30.1 (86.2)	32.4 (90.3)	34.7 (94.5)	35.6 (96.1)	34.1 (93.4)	33.4 (92.1)	33.4 (92.1)	33 (91)	31.3 (88.3)	30.1 (86.2)	28.6 (83.5)	32.1 (89.8)
Mean daily minimum °C (°F)	19 (66)	19.7 (67.5)	21 (70)	22.7 (72.9)	23.6 (74.5)	23.3 (73.9)	22.6 (72.7)	22.7 (72.9)	22.9 (73.2)	22.1 (71.8)	20.8 (69.4)	19.5 (67.1)	21.7 (71.1)
Average precipitation mm (inches)	110 (4.3)	71 (2.8)	61 (2.4)	69 (2.7)	140 (5.6)	260 (10.4)	200 (8)	240 (9.3)	360 (14.1)	280 (11)	140 (5.6)	120 (4.8)	2,100 (81)
Source: Weatherbase

== Transportation ==
Tenosique is also the site of a railway station on the Tren Maya.

Tenosique

Services
Preceding station	Tren Maya	Following station
Boca del Cerro toward Palenque	Tren Maya	El Triunfo toward Cancún Airport
Location
