= Chumpan River =

Location
- Country: Mexico
- State: Campeche

Physical characteristics
- Mouth
  - location: Laguna de Términos
  - coordinates: 18°26′54″N 91°31′23″W
  - elevation: sea level
- Basin size: 1,874 km^{2}
- Discharge
  - average: 1,368 million cubic meters

The Chumpan River is a river in Campeche state of southern Mexico. It originates along the border between Campeche and Tabasco, and flows generally northwards to empty into Balchacah Lagoon, a subsidiary lagoon to Laguna de Términos, which connects to the Gulf of Mexico. Its chief tributaries are the San Joaquin and Salsipuedes rivers.

The Chumpan drains an area of 1,874 square kilometers. It is bounded by the Usumacinta River watershed on the south and west, and the Candelaria River watershed on the east.

The climate of the watershed is tropical and semi-humid. The average annual temperature is 25º C, and the average annual rainfall is 1,602 mm. The average annual drainage volume is 1,368 million cubic meters.

The northern, uplands portion of the watershed is in the Petén–Veracruz moist forests ecoregion. As it reaches the northern lowlands it flows through the eastern extension of the Pantanos de Centla, an expanse of seasonally- to permanently-flooded freshwater swamp forest. The Usumacinta mangroves extend around the shore of the Laguna de Términos where fresh and salt water meet, including the Balachah lagoon system.

== See also ==
- List of rivers of Mexico
