= Punta Xicalango =

Mexican geographical feature

Punta Xicalango is a geographical feature in Campeche, Mexico. It is a sandy protrusion from the mainland of Yucatán Peninsula into the Gulf of Mexico, and it marks the point where the peninsula's coastline changes direction. It is located 5 km to the northeast of Punta Zacatal, above the western channel that connects the Laguna de Términos with the Gulf of Mexico and faces Carmen Island.

== History ==
This point is considered the western boundary of the territory that historically corresponded to the Maya civilization; that is, it would have been the border with other Pre-Columbian Mesoamerican peoples. It was, according to some sources, an important site of exchange and place of settlement of the Putún or Chontal Maya.

== Transportation ==
Before the construction of Zacatal Bridge in 1994, ferries connecting Carmen Island with the continent docked at Punta Xicalango.
