= Palizada (disambiguation) =

Palizada is a city in Mexico.

Palizada may also refer to:

- Palizada Municipality, Mexico
- Palizada River, a river in Mexico
