= 2nd federal electoral district of Campeche =

Electoral district of Mexico

Campeche's 2nd
- Electoral district of the Chamber of Deputies of Mexico

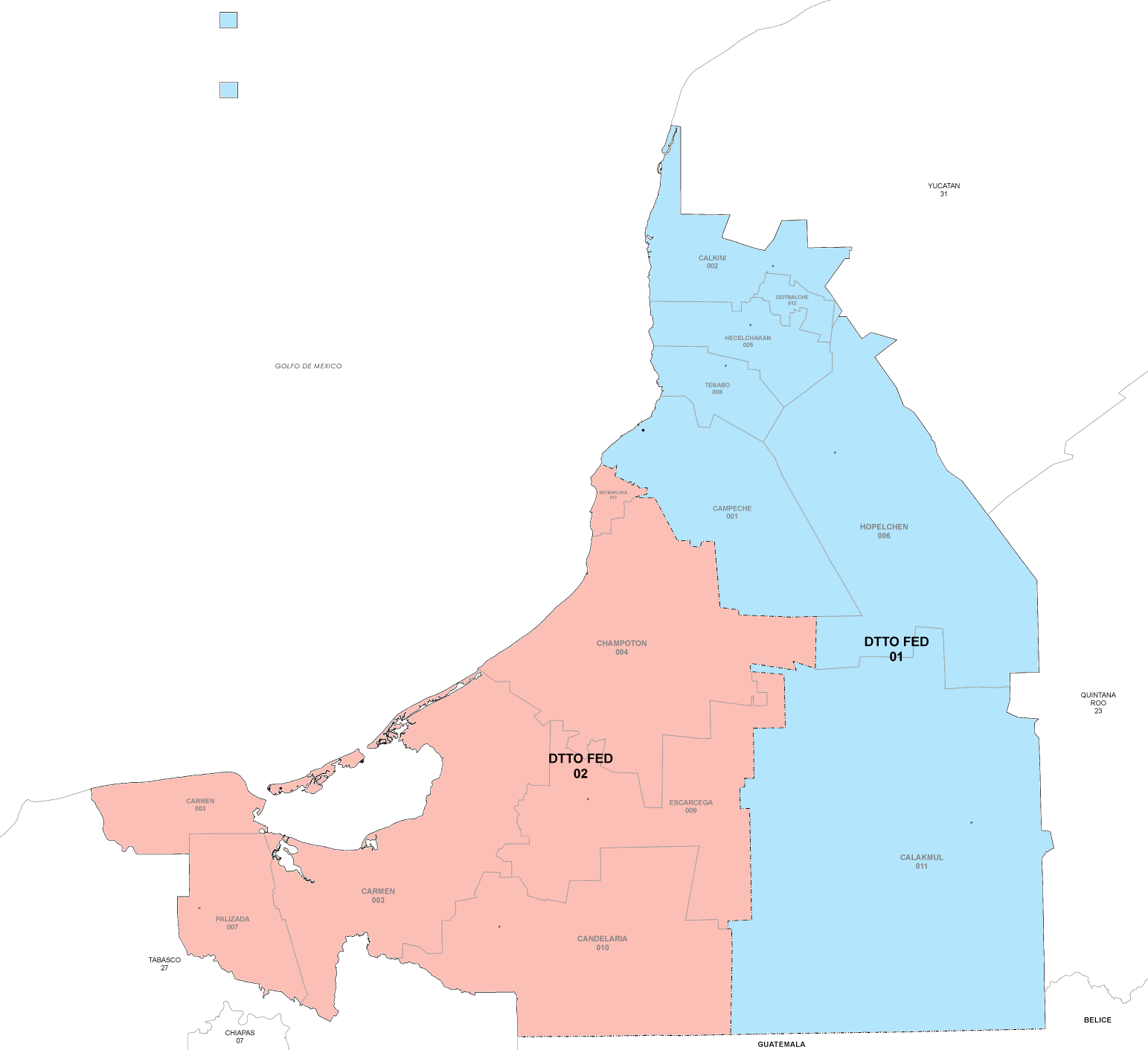
- 2nd district

Incumbent
- Member: Gabriela del Carmen Basto González
- Party: ▌Morena
- Congress: 66th (2024–2027)

District
- State: Campeche
- Head town: Ciudad del Carmen
- Coordinates: 18°38′N 91°50′W
- Covers: Candelaria, Carmen, Champotón, Escárcega, Palizada, Seybaplaya
- PR region: Third
- Precincts: 278
- Population: 457,773 (2020 census)

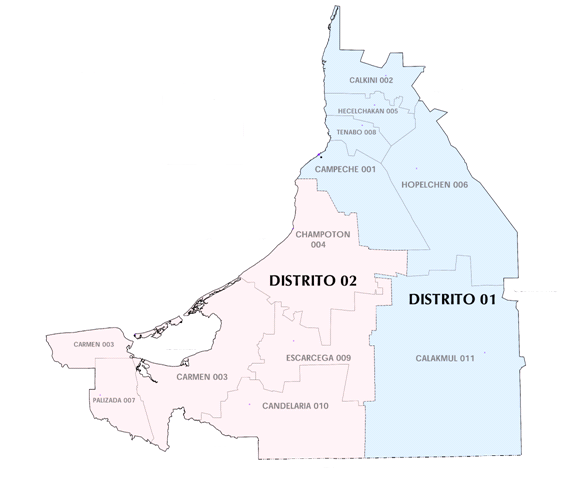
Campeche's 2017–2022 districts

The 2nd federal electoral district of Campeche (Spanish: Distrito electoral federal 02 de Campeche) is one of the 300 electoral districts into which Mexico is divided for elections to the federal Chamber of Deputies and one of two such districts in the state of Campeche.

It elects one deputy to the lower house of Congress for each three-year legislative session by means of the first-past-the-post system. Votes cast in the district also count towards the calculation of proportional representation ("plurinominal") deputies elected from the third region.

The current member for the district, elected in the 2024 general election, is Gabriela del Carmen Basto González of the National Regeneration Movement (Morena).

== District territory ==
Under the 2023 districting plan adopted by the National Electoral Institute (INE), which is to be used for the 2024, 2027 and 2030 federal elections, the second district comprises 278 electoral precincts (secciones electorales) across six municipalities in the west of the state:

- Candelaria, Carmen, Champotón, Escárcega, Palizada and Seybaplaya

The district's head town (cabecera distrital), where results from individual polling stations are gathered together and tallied, is the city of Ciudad del Carmen. The district reported a population of 457,773 in the 2020 census.

== Previous districting schemes ==
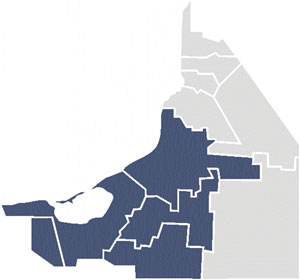
2nd district in 2005–2017

Evolution of electoral district numbers
	1974	1978	1996	2005	2017	2023
Campeche	2	2	2	2	2	2
Chamber of Deputies	196	300				

2017–2022

In the 2017 plan, the district covered five municipalities: Candelaria, Carmen, Champotón, Escárcega and Palizada. (Note: Sebaplaya did not come into existence until 2021.)

2005–2017

Under the 2005 districting scheme, the 2nd district covered the same five municipalities as in the 2017 plan.

1996–2005

Between 1996 and 2005, the district comprised four municipalities: Carmen, Champotón, Escárcega and Palizada. (Note: Candelaria was not created until 1998.)

1978–1996

The districting scheme in force from 1978 to 1996 was the result of the 1977 electoral reforms, which increased the number of single-member seats in the Chamber of Deputies from 196 to 300. Campeche's seat allocation, however, remained unchanged at two. The 2nd district had its head town at the state capital, San Francisco de Campeche, and it covered the municipalities of Calkiní, Campeche, Hecelchakán, Hopelchén and Tenabo.

== Deputies returned to Congress ==
(Mexico) National parties
- Current
- PAN
- PRI
- PT
- PVEM
- MC
- Morena
- PAZ
- Somos
- Defunct or local only
- PLM
- PNR
- PRM
- PNM
- PP
- PPS
- PARM
- PFCRN
- CON
- PANAL
- PSD
- PES
- PES
- PRD

Campeche's 2nd district
Election	Deputy	Party	Term	Legislature
1916	Herminio Pérez Abreu		1916–1917	Constituent Congress of Querétaro
1917	Julio Zapata		1917–1918	27th Congress
1918	Conrado Ocampo	PPC	1918–1920	28th Congress
1920	Herminio Pérez Abreu	PLC	1920–1922	29th Congress
1922	José Zertucha		1922–1924	30th Congress
1924	Eduardo R. Mena Córdova		1924–1927	31st Congress
1926	Eduardo R. Mena Córdova		1926–1928	32nd Congress
1928	Ángel Castillo Lanz		1928–1930	33rd Congress
1930	Fausto Bojórquez Castillo		1930–1932	34th Congress
1932	Fernando Enrique Angli Lara (Note: Assumed his seat on 6 December 1932 after a special election was held in the district on 20 November 1932.)		1932–1934	35th Congress
1934	Ramón Félix Flores		1934–1937	36th Congress
1937	Ignacio Reyes Ortega	Institutional Revolutionary Party	1937–1940	37th Congress
1940	Ramón Berzunza Pinto		1940–1943	38th Congress
1943	Arcadio Ché Canché	Institutional Revolutionary Party	1943–1946	39th Congress
1946	Carlos Sansores Pérez	Institutional Revolutionary Party	1946–1949	40th Congress
1949	Alberto Perera Castillo	Institutional Revolutionary Party	1949–1952	41st Congress
1952	Leopoldo Sales Rovira	Institutional Revolutionary Party	1952–1955	42nd Congress
1955	Carlos Sansores Pérez	Institutional Revolutionary Party	1955–1958	43rd Congress
1958	Carlos Cano Cruz	Institutional Revolutionary Party	1958–1961	44th Congress
1961	Carlos Sansores Pérez	Institutional Revolutionary Party	1961–1964	45th Congress
1964	José Dolores García Aguilar	Institutional Revolutionary Party	1964–1967	46th Congress
1967	Manuel Pavón Bahaine	Institutional Revolutionary Party	1967–1970	47th Congress
1970	Alberto Carrillo Zavala	Institutional Revolutionary Party	1970–1973	48th Congress
1973	Luis Fernando Solís Patrón	Institutional Revolutionary Party	1973–1976	49th Congress
1976	Jorge Muñoz Icthe	Institutional Revolutionary Party	1976–1979	50th Congress
1979	José Edilberto Vázquez Rios	Institutional Revolutionary Party	1979–1982	51st Congress
1982	Alberto Carrillo Zavala	Institutional Revolutionary Party	1982–1985	52nd Congress
1985	Pedro Dario López Vargas	Institutional Revolutionary Party	1985–1988	53rd Congress
1988	Jorge Enrique Minet Ortiz	Institutional Revolutionary Party	1988–1991	54th Congress
1991	Francisco Puga Ramayo	Institutional Revolutionary Party	1991–1994	55th Congress
1994	Gabriel Escalante Castillo	Institutional Revolutionary Party	1994–1997	56th Congress
1997	Aracely Escalante Jasso	Institutional Revolutionary Party	1997–2000	57th Congress
2000	Ricardo Augusto Ocampo Fernández	Institutional Revolutionary Party	2000–2003	58th Congress
2003	Sebastián Calderón Centeno	National Action Party (Mexico)	2003–2006	59th Congress
2006	Arturo Martínez Rocha	Institutional Revolutionary Party	2006–2009	60th Congress
2009	Óscar Román Rosas González	Institutional Revolutionary Party	2009–2012	61st Congress
2012	Rocío Abreu Artiñano	Ecologist Green Party of Mexico	2012–2015	62nd Congress
2015	Rocío Matesanz Santamaría	National Action Party (Mexico)	2015–2018	63rd Congress
2018	Irasema del Carmen Buenfil Díaz	sinmarco	2018–2021	64th Congress
2021	María Sierra Damián	National Regeneration Movement	2021–2024	65th Congress
2024	Gabriela del Carmen Basto González	National Regeneration Movement	2024–2027	66th Congress

== Presidential elections ==
Campeche's 2nd district
Election	District won by	Party or coalition	%
2018	Andrés Manuel López Obrador	Juntos Haremos Historia	64.5890
2024 (Note: In the 2024 election, Campeche was the only state where Xóchitl Gálvez of the Fuerza y Corazón por México coalition placed third, behind Jorge Máynez of the Citizens' Movement.)	Claudia Sheinbaum Pardo	Sigamos Haciendo Historia	70.7104
