= Palizada River =

Location
- Country: Mexico
- State: Campeche
- Municipality: Palizada

Physical characteristics
- Source
  - location: Usumacinta River
- Mouth
  - location: Atasta Lagoon – Laguna de Términos
  - elevation: sea level

The Palizada River is a river in Mexico. It is a distributary of the Usumacinta River. It branches from the lower Usumacinta and flows northeastwards, emptying into a complex of lagoons (Viejo, Santa Gertrudis, and El Vapor) connected to Laguna de Términos, a coastal lagoon of the Gulf of Mexico.

The town of Palizada is on the river.

The Palizada provides about 75% of the freshwater inflow to the Laguna de Términos. The river's flow varies seasonally, generally highest during October and November, and declining from December to June. The river is an important source of nutrients for the adjacent wetlands and lagoons.

The Palizada flows through the Pantanos de Centla, a large permanently-flooded freshwater swamp forest. As it nears the Laguna de Términos, fresh and salt waters mix, supporting the extensive mangroves. The mangroves along the lower Palizada are the tallest and best developed in the region, with trees reaching up to 30 meters in height.

== See also ==
- List of rivers of Mexico
