= Aracely Escalante Jasso =

Mexican politician

- Born: 17 July 1943 (age 83); Ciudad del Carmen, Campeche, Mexico
- Occupation: Politician
- Political party: PRI

Aracely Escalante Jasso (born 17 July 1943) is a Mexican politician affiliated with the Institutional Revolutionary Party (PRI).

In 2000–2006 she served as a senator for Campeche during the 58th and 59th Congresses. She was also elected to the Chamber of Deputies for the 57th Congress (representing Campeche's 2nd district) and the 60th Congress (as a plurinominal deputy for the third region).

She also owns an AM/FM radio station in her hometown, XHBCC-FM/XEBCC-AM 100.5/1030.
