= Palizada =

City in the Mexican state of Campeche

- City and municipal seat
- Location within Mexico
- Coordinates: 18°15′16″N 92°5′27″W
- Country: Mexico
- State: Campeche
- Municipality: Palizada

Population (2010)
  - Total: 3,089
- Time zone: UTC−6 (Central (US Central))
  - Summer (DST): UTC−5 (Central)
- Website: www.palizada.gob.mx/

Palizada (Spanish: [paliˈsaða]) is a city in the Mexican state of Campeche. It is situated in the south-west of the state. It is the municipal seat for the Palizada Municipality.

As of 2010, the Palizada had a population of 3,089.

Palizada is on the Palizada River, a distributary of the Usumacinta which empties into Laguna de Términos.

Palizada was named a "Pueblo Mágico" in 2010.

== Climate ==
Climate data for Palizada (1991–2020)
Month	Jan	Feb	Mar	Apr	May	Jun	Jul	Aug	Sep	Oct	Nov	Dec	Year
Record high °C (°F)	38 (100)	40 (104)	45 (113)	43 (109)	44 (111)	43 (109)	41 (106)	40 (104)	41 (106)	40 (104)	39 (102)	39 (102)	45 (113)
Mean daily maximum °C (°F)	28.6 (83.5)	30.3 (86.5)	32.6 (90.7)	35.2 (95.4)	35.9 (96.6)	34.4 (93.9)	34.0 (93.2)	34.0 (93.2)	33.2 (91.8)	31.6 (88.9)	30.0 (86.0)	29.1 (84.4)	32.4 (90.3)
Daily mean °C (°F)	23.3 (73.9)	24.6 (76.3)	26.5 (79.7)	28.5 (83.3)	29.4 (84.9)	28.5 (83.3)	28.3 (82.9)	28.3 (82.9)	27.7 (81.9)	26.7 (80.1)	25.2 (77.4)	24.0 (75.2)	26.8 (80.2)
Mean daily minimum °C (°F)	18.1 (64.6)	18.9 (66.0)	20.3 (68.5)	21.8 (71.2)	22.8 (73.0)	22.6 (72.7)	22.5 (72.5)	22.6 (72.7)	22.3 (72.1)	21.8 (71.2)	20.4 (68.7)	19.0 (66.2)	21.1 (70.0)
Record low °C (°F)	8 (46)	7 (45)	10 (50)	7 (45)	14 (57)	16 (61)	2 (36)	16 (61)	16 (61)	14 (57)	10 (50)	10 (50)	2 (36)
Average precipitation mm (inches)	78.1 (3.07)	49.8 (1.96)	30.7 (1.21)	26.2 (1.03)	95.6 (3.76)	246.3 (9.70)	156.4 (6.16)	220.7 (8.69)	275.5 (10.85)	305.0 (12.01)	165.1 (6.50)	97.5 (3.84)	1,746.9 (68.78)
Average precipitation days (≥ 0.1 mm)	7.8	5.0	3.3	2.9	6.1	14.7	14.5	15.1	16.6	16.2	10.4	7.8	120.4
Source: Servicio Meteorologico Nacional
