= San Pedro y San Pablo River =

Location
- Country: Mexico
- states: Campeche and Tabasco

Physical characteristics
- Source
  - location: Usumacinta River
- Mouth
  - location: Atasta Lagoon – Laguna de Términos

The San Pedro y San Pablo River is a river of Mexico. It is a distributary of the Usumacinta River. It branches from the lower Usumacinta and flows northwards, emptying into Atasta and Pom lagoons which are connected to Laguna de Términos, which in turn connects to the Gulf of Mexico.

== See also ==
- List of rivers of Mexico
