= Arturo Martínez Rocha =

Mexican politician

- Born: 1 December 1950 (age 75); Campeche, Mexico
- Occupation: Politician
- Political party: PRI

Arturo Martínez Rocha (born 1 December 1950) is a Mexican politician affiliated with the Institutional Revolutionary Party (PRI).

From 1997 to 2003 Martínez Rocha was the general secretary of the 47th section of the PEMEX Workers' Union and from 2003 to 2006 he was the union's president. In 2006–2009 he served as a federal deputy in the 60th Congress, representing Campeche's 2nd district.
