= Laguna de Términos =

Lagoon on the Gulf coast of Mexico

- IUCN category VI (protected area with sustainable use of natural resources)
- Location within Mexico
- Location: Campeche, Mexico
- Nearest town: Ciudad del Carmen
- Coordinates: 18°40′N 91°45′W
- Area: 7,061.48 km^{2} (2,726.45 sq mi)
- Designation: Flora and fauna protection area
- Designated: 1994
- Governing body: National Commission of Natural Protected Areas

Ramsar Wetland
- Official name: Área de Protección de Flora y Fauna Laguna de Términos
- Designated: 2 February 2004
- Reference no.: 1356

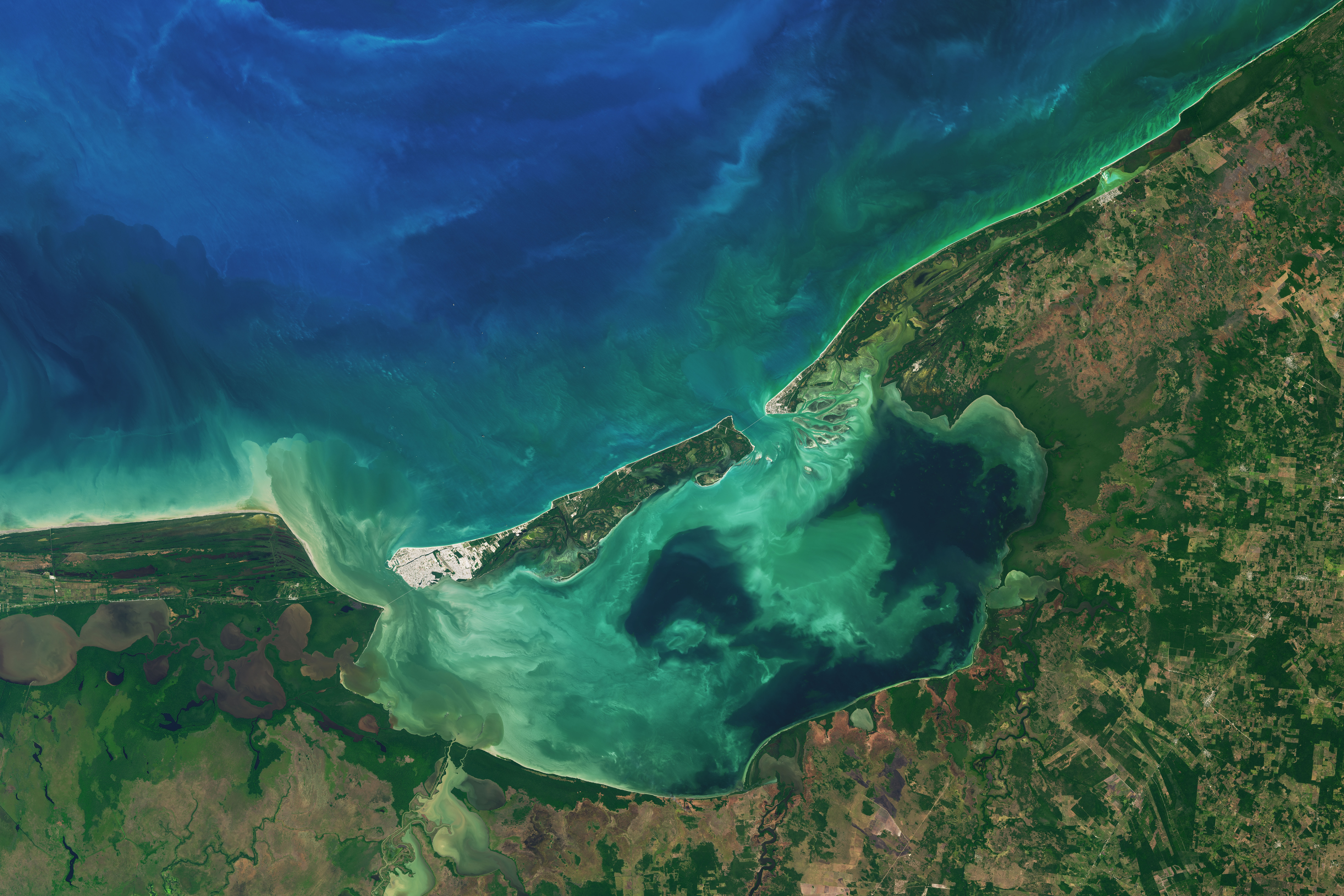
Satellite photo of Laguna de Términos

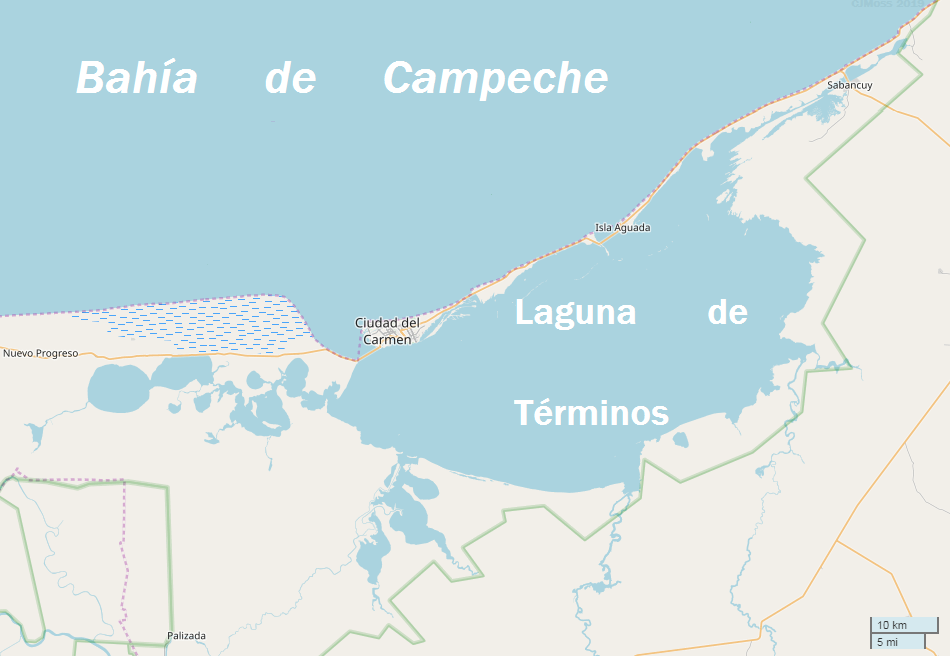
Map of Laguna de Términos and nearby bodies of water

Laguna de Términos is the largest tidal lagoon by volume located entirely on the Gulf of Mexico, as well as one of the most biodiverse. Exchanging water with several rivers and lagoons, the Laguna is part of the most important hydrographic river basin in Mexico. It is important commercially, as well as ecologically by serving as a refuge for extensive flora and fauna; its mangroves play an important role as a refuge for migratory birds.

== Geography ==
Laguna de Términos (Lagoon of Ends, as the first Spanish explorers thought it was the end of the "island" of Yucatan) is made up of a series of rich, sediment-laden lagoons and tidal estuaries connected by two channels to the Bay of Campeche in the southern part of the Gulf of Mexico. It lies in the southwestern part of the Mexican state of Campeche, mostly within Carmen Municipality, with the southwestern portion in Palizada Municipality.

It is 72 km (45 mi) long, 24 km (15 mi) wide, and covers an area of 1,550 km^{2} (600 sq mi). Every nine days, approximately 50% of the lagoon's water volume is renewed, primarily through the effect of ocean tides. Isla del Carmen is a barrier island which separates the lagoon from the Bay of Campeche. There are two permanent channels connecting the lagoon to the Bay of Campeche – Boca de Puerto Real to the east of Isla del Carmen, and Boca del Carmen to the west. Inflow from the bay is via the Boca de Puerto Real, and outflow is via the Boca del Carmen.

Its shores are swampy and support extensive mangroves. It is fed by several freshwater rivers, which empty into the main lagoon via smaller lagoons. The Candelaria River enters from the southeast via Panlao lagoon. The Chumpan River enters from the south via Balchacah lagoon. Two distributaries of the Usumacinta River flow into the western lagoon – the Palizada River enters via Viento Este and Vapor lagoons, and the San Pedro y San Pablo River flows into a chain of lagoons, including Pom and Atasta, west of and connected to the main lagoon. The Palizada provides about 75% of the total freshwater inflow to the lagoon, and the western end is generally more nutrient-rich and less saline than the eastern end.

The city of Ciudad del Carmen is located on Isla del Carmen, between the lagoon and the Bay of Campeche. The Zacatal Bridge spans the Boca del Carmen, connecting Isla del Carmen to the mainland Atasta Peninsula, which encloses the lagoon on the northwest. The bridge is part of Mexican Federal Highway 180, which runs along Mexico's Gulf coast including down the length of Isla del Carmen. The highway also spans the Boca de Puerto Real as it continues east.

== Flora and fauna ==
Twenty-nine percent of the lagoon is covered with seagrass. The lagoon was designated as a federally protected area for flora and fauna in 1994 by the Mexican government because of the importance of the biological ecosystems provided by its estuaries. There have been 1,468 identified fauna species found within the protected area of Laguna de Términos; 30 species are endemic to Mexico and 89 are threatened; 132 species are considered to be commercially important. There are 279 bird, 74 insect (considered an incomplete listing), and 34 mammal species identified. At least 367 species of fish are listed.

The Usumacinta mangroves extend around the edges of the lagoon where freshwater meets salt, and westward into the lower Usumacinta-Grijalva basin. The Usumacinta distributaries bring higher freshwater and nutrient inflows to the western part of the lagoon, and the mangroves near the outlet of the Palizada are the largest and best developed, with some trees reaching over 30 meters in height. The Pantanos de Centla, a vast seasonally- or permanently flooded freshwater swamp forest, lies east and south of the mangroves. The seasonally-dry Yucatán moist forests lie east of the lagoon.

It is a known breeding and nursery area for the yellow stingray (Urobatis jamaicensis); seagrass is reported to be important for its parturition.

Campeche and Tabasco hold wetlands consisting of mangrove zones, swamps, and lagoons serving as important habitats for aquatic reptiles such as crocodiles (American, Morelet's, brown caiman). Nationally endangered hawksbill, green sea, and Kemp's ridley sea turtles come on sandy shores to lay eggs especially setting a special protection on Kemp's ridley turtles.

Mangroves around the Lagoon of Términos provide a migratory collider for at least 33% of the Mississippi Flyway - migratory birds.

Of about 134 mammalian species from 27 families present in the area, rare and endangered species include felines (jaguar, ocelot, margay), primates (Geoffroy's spider monkey), and marine mammals including cetaceans and the West Indian manatee.

=== Bottlenose dolphins ===
Bottlenose dolphins (Tursiops truncatus) are known to visit the lagoon regularly, but their safety could be endangered due to several artificial factors. A conservation group called Instituto Via Delphi, specially set up for the protection of local dolphins along Mexican gulf regions, was founded to focus understanding of biology of these dolphins and to strengthen their protection.

== History ==
On the surrounding barrier islands, beach ridges, and mangrove coastline there are several Late Postclassic Maya sites. The region was home to a settlement or region known as Xicallanco (hispanized to Xicalango), which may have been located on the western shore near the coast. Olmeca-Xicallanca people had migrated here at some point after the twelfth century, and are likely connected to the name. Xicalango was a city-state inhabited primarily by Nahuas, and was an important port of trade connecting the Aztec Empire with the Maya civilization. By the 16th century, Aztec pochteca (long-distance merchants) served on the governing council and Aztec soldiers may have been stationed here to protect the pochteca. The pochteca of Xicalango had a particular interest in the cacao cultivated in what is now central Tabasco, and they stationed merchants and storehouses at certain places in the region. In 1525, Xicalango destroyed Cortes' supply ships and killed their crews. Later it was claimed by the Villa de Santa María de la Victoria, but remained de facto independent. Francisco de Montejo conquered Xicalango in 1529, but control declined after he left for Campeche in early 1531, leading his son to reclaim it in 1536. By 1550 it was largely abandoned and the remaining inhabitants were moved to Jonuta.

Juan de Grijalva encountered the Boca de Términos during his 1518 expedition.

== Threats ==
The biggest influence on the area and a possible threat are the operations of state-owned oil company, Pemex operating within the protected area. The drilling of oil wells and the construction of pipelines can destroy habitat. Additionally, oil spills are a continual threat. Other possible threats include habitat change through population growth in the surrounding area. Laguna de Términos Flora and Fauna Protection Area as a whole is considered to be critically threatened.

Although Pemex is both the biggest influence and the biggest threat to the protected area and its biodiversity, it is also economically important to Mexico. Currently there is a petroleum boom which presents an opportunity for the management of the protected area to offer to cooperate with the industry and coordinate use of the resources. There are local residents and non-governmental organizations who are aware of the potential problems and who are a strong voice, with public protests against Pemex plans that emphasize the destruction to ecosystems and quality of life at other Pemex locations. Pemex has acknowledged that they must take into account the opinions of the protected area's management and other voices when planning projects so as to minimize negative environment impacts.

Local populations of crocodiles and sea turtles in the areas are in serious danger due to their value for commercial industries.
