= Candelaria River =

Coordinates: 18.15325°N 91.02516°W

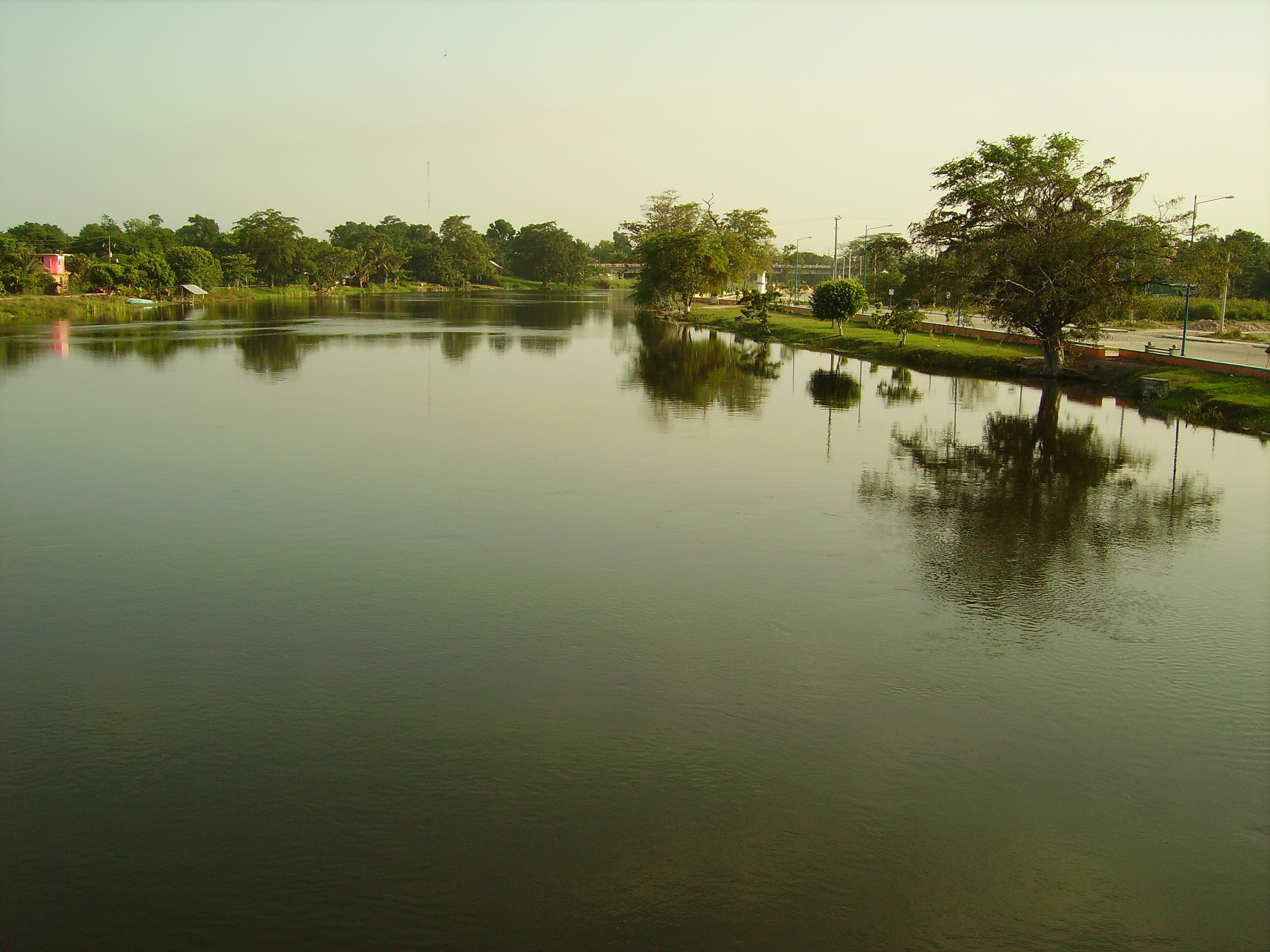

Location
- Countries: Guatemala and Mexico

Physical characteristics
- Length: 400 km (250 mi)
- Basin size: 9,228 km^{2} (3,563 sq mi)

The Candelaria River is a river of Central America that flows from Guatemala to Laguna de Términos, Mexico, It has a length of about 400 kilometres (250 mi) and drains a basin of 9,228 km^{2} (3,563 sq mi).

== See also ==
- List of rivers of Mexico
