= Usumacinta mangroves =

Ecoregion in Mexico

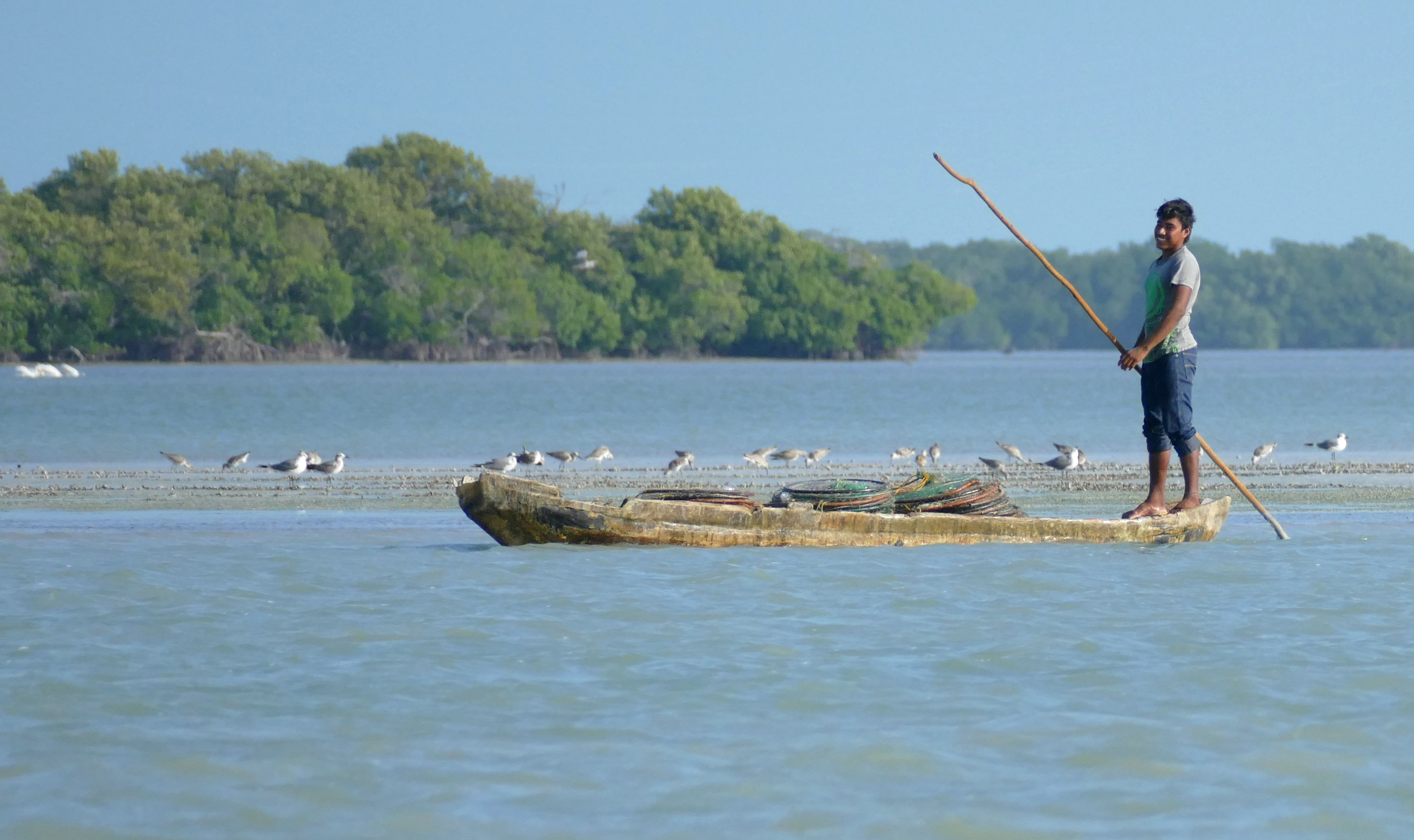
- Laguna de Terminos, Isla Aguada, Campeche, Mexico

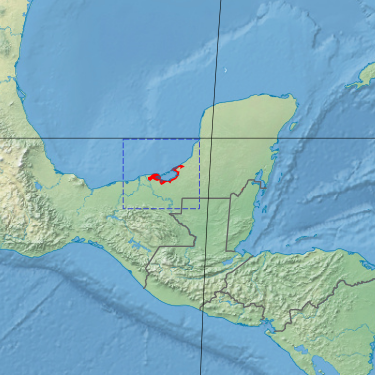
- Ecoregion territory (in purple)

Ecology
- Realm: Neotropic
- Biome: Mangroves

Geography
- Area: 3,108 km^{2} (1,200 sq mi)
- Country: Mexico
- Coordinates: 18.76°N 91.22°W

The Usumacinta mangroves ecoregion (WWF ID: NT1437) covers the mangrove forests on the Gulf Coast of Mexico, around the margins of the Laguna de Términos ("Lagoon of Ends"). The "Ends" in the name refer to the mouths of the rivers that empty into the lagoon, including the Usumacinta River. This region, which is due south of the mouth of the Mississippi River across the Gulf of Mexico, receives an estimated one-third of the wintering birds migrating on the Mississippi Flyway. It is estimated that the lagoon supports 90 endangered species.

== Location and description ==
The lagoon and surroundings are in Campeche State of Mexico. The mangroves cover the river deltas of the Usumacinta River and Grijalva River. They also cover the margins of the lagoon and inland for 5 km or so where the balance of saline and fresh water supports mangrove species. The lagoon is a RAMSAR wetland of international importance. The surrounding inland ecoregion is the Pantanos de Centla ecoregion.

== Climate ==
The climate of the ecoregion is Tropical savanna climate - dry winter (Köppen climate classification (Aw)). This climate is characterized by relatively even temperatures throughout the year, and a pronounced dry season. The driest month has less than 60 mm of precipitation, and is drier than the average month. Precipitation in the ecoregion averages 1,600 mm/year.

== Flora and fauna ==
The characteristic mangrove tree species in the region are red mangrove (Rhizophora mangle), white mangrove (Laguncularia racemosa), and black mangrove (Avicennia germinans). An associated species is the scrub Dalbergia brownii. Periodic flooding prevents the extensive growth of herbaceous species. The diversity of wetland types (marshes, swamps, coastal lagoon, riverine margins and others) supports a wide diversity of species. Scientists have recorded 374 species of vascular plants, 134 species of mammals, 26 of amphibians, 85 of reptiles, 279 of birds, and 60 species of fish.

== Protected areas ==
Officially protected areas in the ecoregion include:

- Pantanos de Centla Biosphere Reserve
