= Zacatal Bridge =

Zacatal Bridge Puente El Zacatal
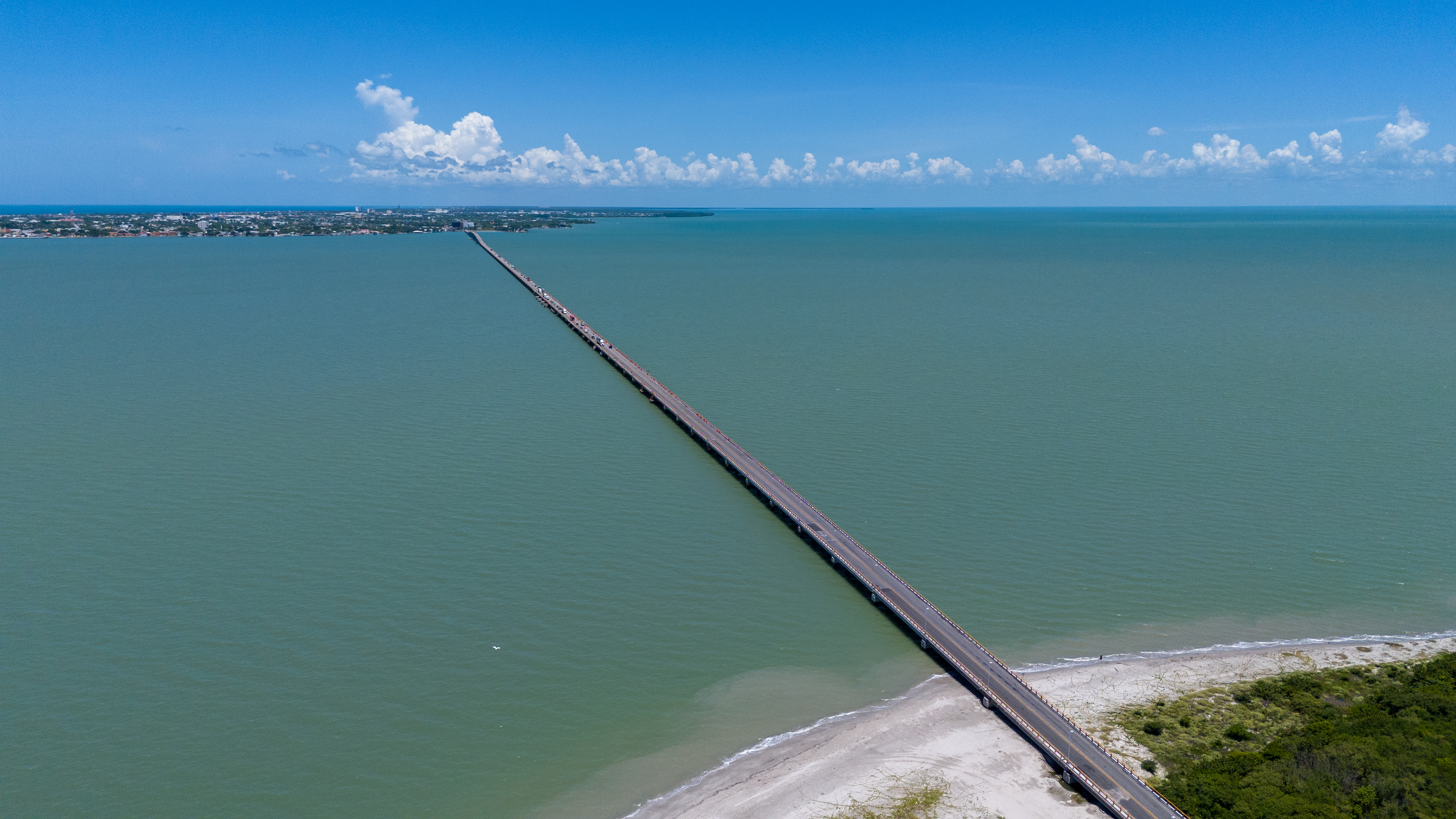
- Aerial drone shot of El Zacatal Bridge
- Coordinates: 18°37′16″N 91°50′28″W
- Carries: Mexican Federal Highway 180
- Crosses: Laguna de Términos
- Locale: Ciudad del Carmen, Campeche, Mexico

Characteristics
- Design: beam bridge
- Material: Concrete
- Total length: 3,861 metres (12,667 ft)
- Width: 9 metres (30 ft) (2 lanes)

History
- Construction end: October 1994

Statistics
- Toll: yes

Location
- Interactive map of Zacatal Bridge

The Zacatal Bridge (Spanish: Puente El Zacatal) is located on the southwest side of Ciudad del Carmen, in the state of Campeche in Mexico. It connects the Atasta peninsula and the Isla del Carmen.

This is the longest bridge in the state and at the time of opening the longest in Mexico with a length of 3,861 m (12,667 ft) and a width of 9 m (30 ft). It is a two-lane road bridge for the Federal Highway 180. It is one of the busiest in the country since it is the gateway to the Yucatán Peninsula.

The superstructure is composed entirely of prefabricated elements to base being: 121 heads of precast concrete, 496 Type IV girders Aastha amended and 8 box girders well as 124 post-tensioned concrete slabs. It was completed in October 1994.

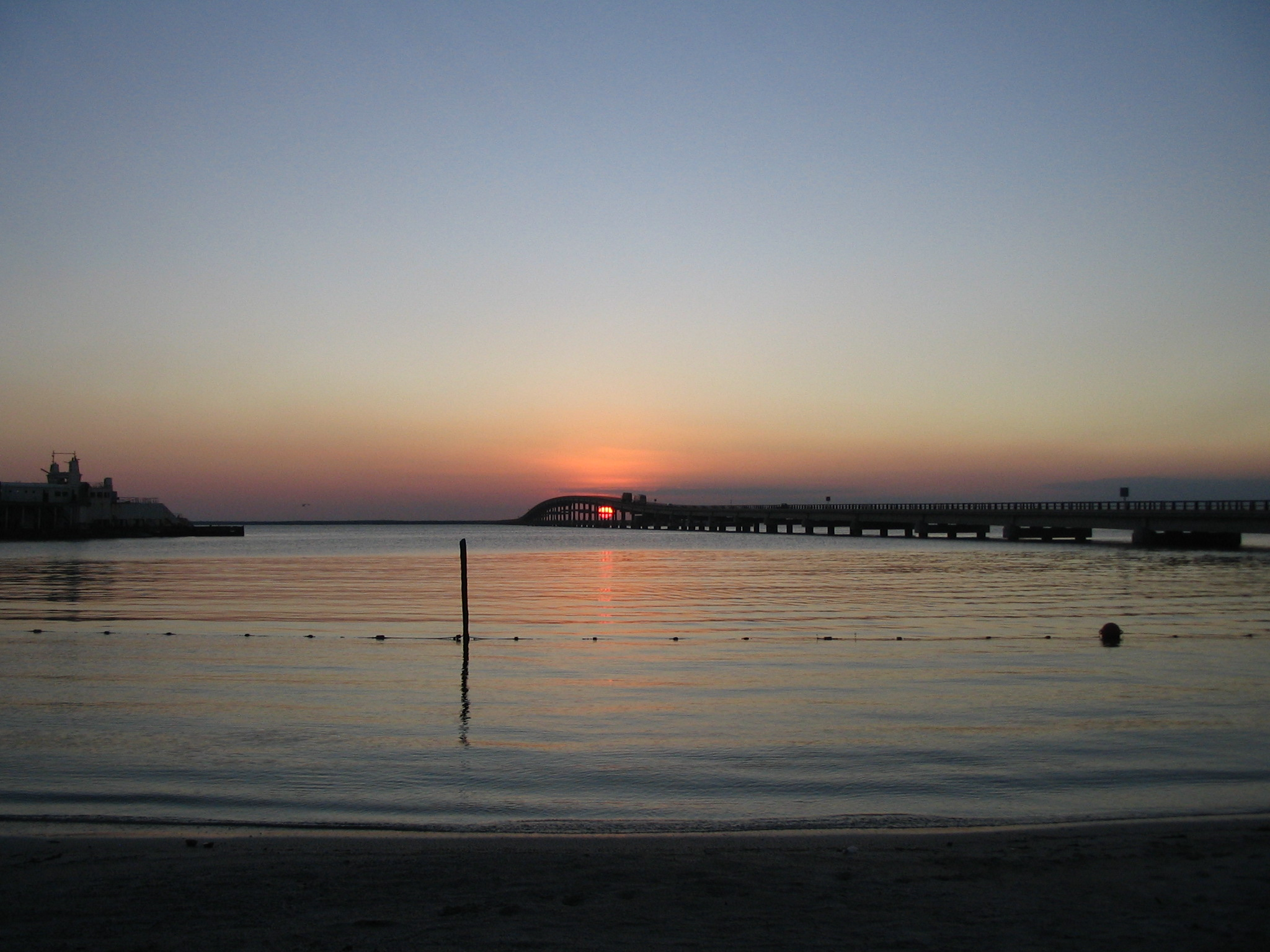
Sunset from Ciudad del Carmen, 27 December 2006
