= Ciudad del Carmen =

City in the Mexican state of Campeche

- City
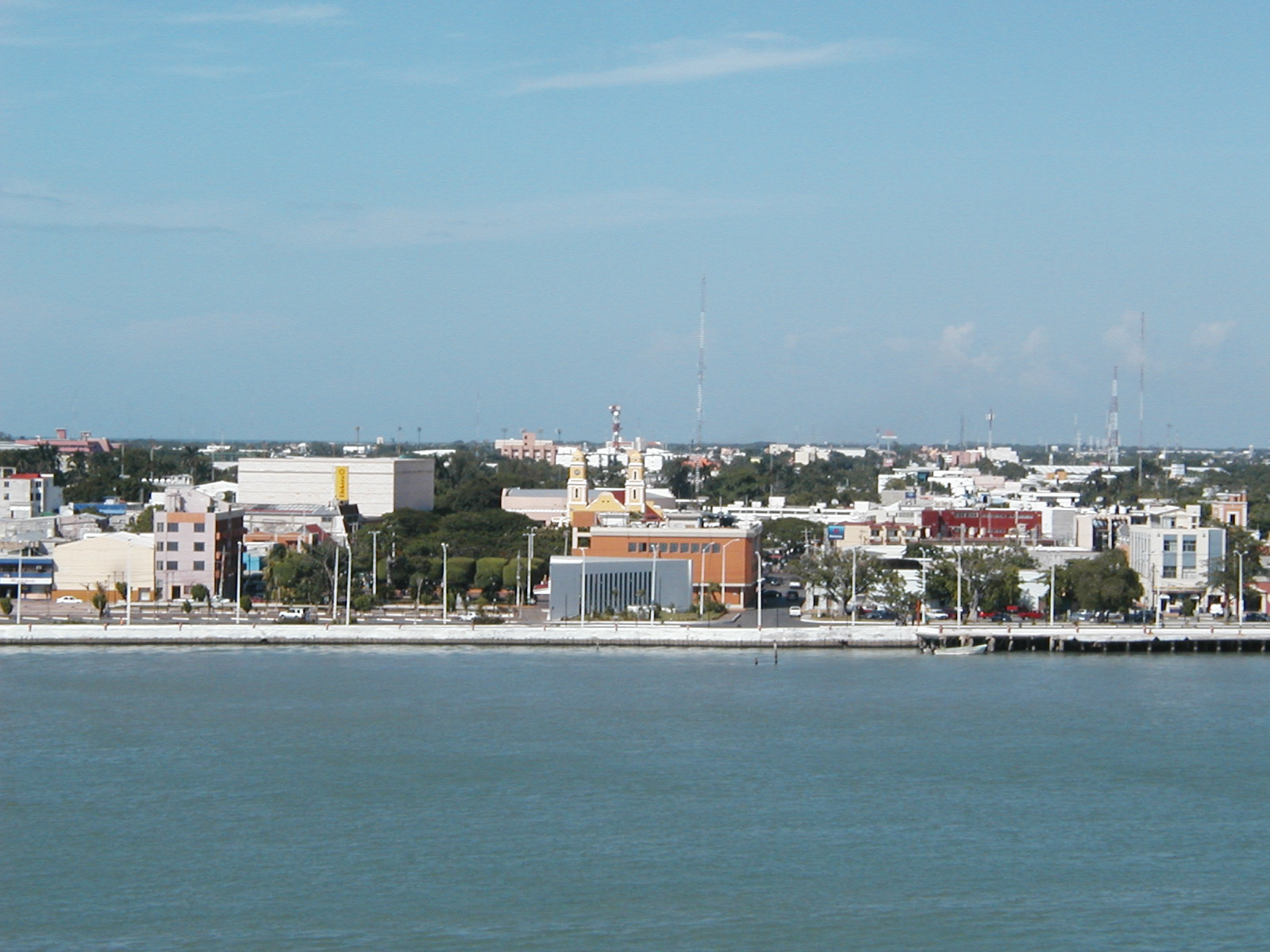
- View of the city from the Laguna de Términos

- Coat of arms
- Nickname: The Pearl of the Gulf
- Location within Campeche Location within Mexico
- Coordinates: 18°38′N 91°50′W
- Country: Mexico
- State: Campeche
- Municipality: Carmen
- City Founded: 16 July 1717

Government
  - Mayor: Priscilla Heredia Novelo (Morena, interim)

Area
  - Total: 35.63 km^{2} (13.76 sq mi)
- Elevation: 2 m (6.6 ft)

Population (2020 census)
  - Total: 191,238
  - Density: 5,367/km^{2} (13,900/sq mi)
- Demonym: Carmelita
- Time zone: UTC−6 (Central (US Central))
- Postal code: 24100
- Area code: 938
- Major Airport: Ciudad del Carmen International Airport
- IATA Code: CME
- ICAO Code: MMCE
- Website: http://www.carmen.gob.mx/

Ciudad del Carmen or Carmen is the second-largest city of the Mexican state of Campeche. Ciudad del Carmen is located in the southwest of the state at 18.63°N 91.83°W on the southwest of Carmen Island, which stands in the Laguna de Términos on the coast of the Gulf of Mexico. As of 2010, Ciudad del Carmen had a population of 169,466, up from the 2005 census of 154,197.

The Puente del Zacatal, constructed in 1994, is one of the longest bridges in Latin America, and was the largest vehicular bridge in Mexico, until it was surpassed by the Nichupté Vehicular Bridge in Cancún, Quintana Roo, inaugurated in 2026.

This border area at the western edge of the Yucatán Peninsula was previously part of the state of Yucatán, then of Tabasco; since 1863 it has been part of the state of Campeche. In 1840 the city had a population of about 7,000.

The city is also the seat of the state of Campeche's Carmen municipality, which includes the city and the surrounding area. The 2010 census population of the municipality of Carmen was 221,094 people, second only to the capital municipality of Campeche.

The main university in Ciudad del Carmen is the Universidad Autónoma del Carmen (UNACAR).

== History ==
Carmen Island/Isla del Carmen was settled by Acalan in the fifteenth century, but they were driven out by their rivals of Xicalango and Chakán Putum.

=== Colonization ===
The Isla del Carmen and its surrounding places were found on the discovery route. By 1518 the island was inhabited by indigenous people of Chontal Maya origin, by migrations of Toltec, Zapotec and Tutul-Xiu groups, conquerors of Xicalango. At the end of May of that same year, the Spaniards arrived aboard four ships at the desired port - Puerto Real or Isla Aguada. At the head of that expedition was Juan de Grijalva and, as an experienced pilot, Antón or Antonio de Alaminos, a navigation man who, to the recorder in his heading letters the Island of Trs (then for making reading difficult in the sea letters are added the letter "i" remaining as tris), from Terms, gave a sense that was the limit of the land discovered by them, although they also considered that there ended the great island they believed was Yucatán. The abbreviation Tris became usual in maps and navigation charts, giving birth to a memorable place for future events, since the colonization of the island was only made years later of the Spanish foundation of San Pedro de Champotón in 1537 and San Francisco de Campeche in 1540. After these initial moments of the Colony, it was pirates who arrived in 1558 to take refuge, first, after taking advantage of the natural resources of the Island of Terms.

Between the 16th and 18th centuries, when the city of Campeche was a trade hub between Spain and New Spain (Mexico), Ciudad del Carmen was inhabited by pirates and served as a port for repairing ships and planning attacks against the Spanish. A 1699 map of the Bay of Campeche indicates Isla del Carmen as two islands: Triest I and Port Royal I. On the opposite side of the lagoon there is a waterway marked as Logwood Creek; this indicates that the residents were probably English and logging was another of their activities. The city received its current name on 16 July 1717, in honor of the Virgin of Carmen, believed to be the protector of the island, when the Spanish forces, commanded by Alonso Felipe de Andrade evicted the pirates from the island and took control of the city after a long period of occupation. Since then, every year at the end of July, Ciudad del Carmen turns into the very center of the regional social, cultural and religious festivities, on the fair that celebrates the island's protector virgin.

Captured as a safe haven and converted into a base for different attacks by sea and land, the Tris Island seems to be destined to fulfill the functions played by Jamaica, in the power of the English since 1655, or the Tortuga Island, which the French dominated, that is to say, port of provisioning of the corsair ships. Laguna or Isla del Carmen has, along with the territorial portion, a unique history for different reasons, among them, that the Spaniards discovered but did not conquer or colonize it; while the pirates made it a den and residence while fighting for neighboring lands and populating other places in the region. Its formal Spanish surgical colonization almost two centuries after the trip of Hernández de Córdoba (Francisco Hernández de Córdoba) and Grijalva to these places. Consequently, the buccaneers sat in that region their reals, and when they did not attack the commercial controls that passed near the place, they dedicated themselves to cutting the dye stick to send it to Europe. They were men of great physical strength, confirmed through the work they carried out, however criminal it was and effectively productive, is carried out in extremely difficult conditions. The harsh environment they supported in the jungle or along rivers and swamps exceeded 35 degrees Celsius. In addition to that, they faced extreme humidity and high numbers of insects- without neglecting the wide variety of vipers and arachnids.

Another historical explanation about the late colonization of the island was its location: in the most hidden area of the Gulf of Mexico, on the border with the indigenous Mayan and Tabscoobs tribes, and immediately to the isthmic region of Tehuantepec, together with its extraordinary timber wealth, but, for that reason, safe refuge of the lowlands that are dedicated to its traffic, reason why always it is constituted in object of ambition of other countries.

The problems of the [Europe of America Colony] remained on the mainland, with a slow and difficult colonization. Progress was made so slowly that, for example, on 4 September 1663, during the provincial government of Francisco Esquivel and de la Rosa, governor and captain general of Yucatán, came with news that Tris Island was held by the pirates, who at that time already exploited, with great utilities, the dye stick.

First expedition (1672)

Two decades had to pass for something to be done about it: on 14 August 1672, a decision was made and a first expedition to the island left the port of Veracruz with the intention of throwing the pirates who had possessed it into the sea; however, in October 1673, the expedition returned with the news of not being able to evict them.

Second expedition (1680)

The stumbling blocks, with the discouragement capacity, did not fall into oblivion, and in the year 1680, the mayor of San Francisco de Campeche, Felipe González de la Barrera, put into operation what we can call the second expedition, which then fixed the mature port and reached Laguna, where rooms, houses, and dyewood were set on fire. The expulsion was temporary, however, because when the soldiers concentrated on the square from which they had left, the pirates returned to their inhabited tasks. However, the fact was considered so remarkable that the king granted the mayor the noble title of Count de la Laguna.

Third expedition (1703)

The characteristics of the region at that time were not hospitable, and that is what I add the distance, what normally covered by water, and what required months and months to go from one place to another. In addition, the settlement of the peninsula passed slowly, and it took a little over two decades to send a third expedition to remove the pirates from the lagoon. At the end of the seventeenth century there are about 600 people organized in Terms and Puerto Real, from 1686 to a considerable number of pirates returned to the island, restarting the harassment of Tabasco villages and taking out the Usumacinta. The Spaniards took over the initiative and Viceroy Gálvez supported the provinces of Tabasco and Yucatán, which in 1690 reconquered the place, but did not settle. Also, the viceroy sent engineer Jaime Frank to study the possibility of fortifying the island; but this one thought that it was not convenient, since when there were several entrances to the island, the opposites could surprise the soldiers and fortify. It is Captain Francisco Fernández who overcomes pirate resistance around the years 1703–1704 with a coast guard, six canoes and 184 well-equipped and armed men. He arrested a hundred English outlaws and nine blacks, and destroyed facilities and boats, seized a small urca loaded with dye stick, a British-built patache with 800 quintals of Campeche stick, a Spanish brig, stolen before by pirates and another built in San Román; the victorious expeditionaries of a sloop, half a hundred canoes, useful for different movements also took over; good amount of rigging and miles of quintals of the stick already cut and ready to embark, but withdrew from the place due to lack of financial support. They made nothing despicable prisoners, like Isaac Hamilton, a London Jew whose mission was to ship the dye bound for New England; William Haven, a native of Jamaica, and John Elliot, a Londoner enlisted in Jamaica in the ranks of piracy. Booty and prisoners were transferred to San Francisco de Campeche, and the last ones sent to the capital of New Spain.

As the continuous pirate attacks, the Spanish authorities decided to organize an eviction of the pirates stationed on the island of Tris. This incursion is carried out in the month of May 1704, for which, the Viceroy sent the Mayor of Tabasco the order to incorporate the Laguna de Términos to carry out an attack along with Campeche forces. The Mayor of Tabasco Mayor, Alonso Felipe de Andrade, affected and personally controlled by 200 men and 14 canoes towards the Laguna de Términos. Andrade discovered fourteen pirate campaigns and after facing them, captured several pirates and artillery pieces that led to Tabasco after having stayed more than a month in the lagoon of Terms, entrances and exits to land and sea demarcated making a map.

Fourth expedition (1707)

Several years have to pass again so that in 1707 — fourth attempt — the governor of Tabasco, Pedro Mier y Terán, sending forces to remove the pirates from the island. They succeed, but the circumstances are repeated: when leaving the place, the pirates return. It was the time when Barbillas settled on the island and from there captured ships and dismantled wineries of other ships. That is, as long as a group of inhabitants was not established, the region would change possession with relative ease.

Fifth expedition (1716)

The English ships were seen returning in 1710, and on their way they sank a coast guard. It became impossible to admit eventualities in the matter of the Laguna de Términos, in such a way that the mayor of Tabasco, Juan Francisco Medina y Cachón, proposed an eviction strategy in which ships from the Windward Navy, based in Veracruz, and the naval forces of Tabasco and San Francisco de Campeche. Those chosen in San Francisco de Campeche for the expedition were: the frigate Nuestra Señora de la Soledad, owned by Mayor Ángel Rodríguez de la Gala; the frigate of Andrés Benito, the sloop of Sebastián García, two coast guard and several canoes for the service of the containers. Mérida, Tacotalpa de la Real Corona and San Francisco de Campeche contributed 7,945 pesos from their royal boxes for the purchase of groceries, war gear and boat cage Preliminary movements were in operation when they had to depend: they reached San Francisco de Campeche the sailor Agustín Toledo, received from Laguna, warning that three English frigates were on the island, one of them with 20 guns, another of 16 and the last with 10; In addition, two brigs without artillery were prepared to ask for help in Jamaica.

Finally, the Mayor of Tabasco, Graniel de Gil, ordered the attack, and the fifth expedition departed from Tabasco on 7 December 1716, under the command of Sergeant Major and former Rulers of Tabasco Mayor of Tabasco, Alonso Felipe de Andrade; the pirates were defeated again, but this time the triumphant Tabasco forces did not withdraw, but instead established a garrison on the island which they named "Fort of San Felipe". The eviction, says Calderón Quijano:

[...] it is a glorious particular page of Spanish history in America. With notable numerical inferiority, carried out a naval attack against the English, achieving their almost total imprisonment and forcing them to lose the lost and the contraband, under extremely benevolent conditions.

=== Military post of El Carmen ===
After that victory, the rapid construction of a defense lurch began, which is the origin of the current Ciudad del Carmen. The prison or fort floor was built with simplicity; the plans indicated that the building was perfectly square and regular, and that it had bulwarks at its angles.

Shortly after, more than a hundred buccaneers wanted to retake the territory and returned with more troops and war supplies, and attacked the Tabasco troops by surprise on 15 July 1717, at night, but courageously were rejected, with the blunt response of "men, bullets and gunpowder enough to defend themselves." The pirates urged De Andrade to surrender and he replied: "Men have enough gunpowder to not deliver the square."

Sergeant Alonso Felipe de Andrade counterattacked, snatched a shrapnel cannon and engaged in a memorable battle. In the combat the sergeant major died Andrade of 50, which is in the center of the rush. The British pirates fled. Throughout the night, the locals continued to persecute those fleeing, at dawn 16 July 1717, there was not a single pirate left alive on the island.

=== Final eviction of pirates ===
Finally, in 1786, the Mayor of Tabasco Francisco de Amuzquívar sent the militias of Tabasco, under the command of the captain Juan de Amestoy and the lieutenant Francisco Interiano, who defeat and evict the English from la Isla del Carmen, reintegrating the island to Tabasco. and rebuilding the military post of 'Nuestra Señora del Carmen' thus ending the presence of pirates in the region.

Since then never again the buccaneers, who were in possession of the island for about 200 years, exploiting their resources and attacking Spanish ships and the Tabasco coasts, where they forced the colonial authorities to change twice the capital of the province of Tabasco, of Santa María de la Victoria to Villahermosa de San Juan Bautista in 1641, and from there to Tacotalpa of the Royal Crown in 1677. Undoubtedly, the expelled English are the ones who went to the opposite side - Belize - to continue their trade as smugglers and smugglers.

=== Dispute between Tabasco and Yucatán ===
Since the colonial era there was a dispute between Tabasco and Yucatán for the possession of the island of Carmen. In 1540 the Province of Tabasco had its greatest extension, since the "... boundary that separated Tabasco from Yucatán was after Sabancuy, and the first Yucatecan people was Tixel". Still in 1817 Tabasco owned the island of Carmen, Palizada and Sabancuy. However, the country's government did not have a clear idea of the geographical location of the island, to such an extent that Iturbide, by order of September 2, 1822, made El Carmen depend on the state of Puebla. But in 1823 the restored Mexican Congress wanting to correct this error, ordered to be reinstated in the jurisdiction of Tabasco "... adding the District of the Laguna de Términos" to the General Command of Tabasco Torruco Saravia (1987), p. 51 fact that was consumed when the Electoral Law for the elections of deputies to the Second Constituent Congress of the Nation was published on 17 June 1823. However, in August 1824, due to pressure from the Yucatán government, Carmen's territory was segregated from Tabasco to be incorporated into Yucatán.

In 1842, the governor of Tabasco Francisco de Sentmanat, decided to invade Yucatán and took Palizada and El Carmen, segregating them from the Yucatecan jurisdiction and reinstating them to the Department of Tabasco, however, when it was overthrown, the new governor José Julián Dueñas returned the territories to Yucatán A few months later, Tabasco recovered the territory of El Carmen, when General Santa Anna decreed, on 2 October 1843, the pass of the El Carmen party to the jurisdiction of Tabasco. However, on 15 July 1854, the same general Antonio López de Santa Anna decreed the creation of the Territory of Carmen, with territory segregated to Tabasco and Yucatán, with which Tabasco was snatched almost the entire game of Usumacinta and the island of Carmen.

Later, on 4 June 1856, the governor of Tabasco José Víctor Jiménez sent a letter to the Constituent Congress of the Nation, raising his voice to request that his old limits be returned to Tabasco, "... to demarcate and extend the current limits of Tabasco with the states of Chiapas, Yucatán and Veracruz". On 17 September 1856, with 77 votes in favor by 8 against, there was the dissolution of the Territory of Carmen, recovering Tabasco only the Usumacinta party, while the district of El Carmen was added to Yucatán, this resolution was embodied in the 1857 Constitution, with which Tabasco lost the territory of El Carmen.

=== Villa title ===
He was granted the title of villa by governmental provision of 2 October 1828, with his respective shield: a lion perched on the island that is eaten by the eagle; Around it bears the following legend: "La Laguna by Yucatán and both by the Mexican Republic".

In 1841, the town of Carmen was granted, by decree of 26 October, the port height category because of the importance of its maritime trade. He also participated in national vicissitudes, struggles between federalists and centralists, and military conflicts. Following the fate of the peninsula, when they experience the split of the Mexican Republic in the 1840s, they chose separation and neutrality; in 1846, in the war against the United States, he followed the criteria that he had adopted on 8 December of that same year the City Hall of San Francisco de Campeche: without being oblivious to popular pressure, in a meeting he pronounced for a postponement of reinstatement until the national government is stable. The historian Bolivar points out that El Carmen was occupied by US forces, commanded by the Commodore Perry who made the line of the Parish; The state authorities contacted the occupation forces. According to Luis Ramírez Aznar, the political group of Santiago Méndez had established communication with Commodore Perry through a special shipment from José Robira, a man of Spanish nationality who had been raised in the United States and settled in Carmen; Méndez himself had visited the Commodore in the port of Veracruz. The neutrality of Yucatán was accepted on the condition of facilitating the occupation of Isla del Carmen, which would be a US base in the region because of its importance. Robira presided over a popular meeting in which the neighbors asked Commodore Perry not to withdraw from the island when peace was signed between the United States and Mexico, until the Supreme Government was in a position to care for the security and defense of Carmen. This exhibition, signed on 5 June 1848, referred to the belligerence between the two countries, as well as the Caste War that had the peninsula in alarm:

Now that the war of the barbarians has made so much progress and that as a result of them an imminent immigration flows daily to this island, that this brings with it only the devouring hunger and the most regrettable indigence: the exponents beg continue the military occupation of this island, as long as the Mexican government can send forces to occupy and defend it, leaving the liquid products of customs revenues for the benefit of the hapless Yucatán Peninsula.

From 1848, due to the social war, the population of Carmen and Sabancuy increased; the Party would count 12,352 inhabitants in the year of 1852, added those established in Palizada. By the year 1849, there was already agricultural production by the course of Palizada, Cerillos and Atasta. The existence of trapiches allowed to process panela, sugar and brandy; rice, corn, cotton, and vegetables, onions, peanuts and sweet potatoes were grown, among others. The town of Carmen caught fire on the days of 16 to 18 March 1850. The guano of the roofs, the weather and the weakness of the buildings caused them to be swept by fire, a tragedy whose origin was suspicious. But the population survived and three years later it was planned with the impulse of the authority exercised by General Tomás Marín.

The fire left those who had been prosperous merchants in misery; An example is the disappearance of the Preciat and Gual company, which lost goods for 10,000 pesos and buildings that were calculated with a value of 30,000 pesos; or the MacGregor house, which disappeared when three buildings that cost 20,000 pesos were reduced to ashes; Domingo Trueba lost in merchandise and buildings 56,000 pesos. Others were fortunate not to lose all of their assets in the fire, and two of the most important dye stick marketers were saved: Benito Anizán and Victoriano Nieves. Esteban Paullada also saved his estate.

=== Territory of El Carmen ===
Shortly thereafter, in November 1853, only the region that comprised Isla del Carmen was declared federal territory; subsequently, its jurisdiction was extended on 15 July 1854, extending from Punta Varaderos to the San Pedro and San Pablo river, on the coast. The City of San Francisco de Campeche, at the motion of the alderman Francisco Estrada Ojeda, agreed to recommend to the Superior Government of the peninsula to make every possible effort to return the Territory of Carmen to the state; the Yucatán government asked the Constituent Congress of 1856 for the restitution of that separate party and, after some discussions, the peninsular entity was reinstated with 77 votes in favor by 8 against, which resulted in the dissolution of the territory of Carmen, recovering Tabasco and Yucatán their respective territories.

A situation that paralyzed political concerns needs to be clarified; Justo Sierra O'Reilly dealt with the points on the items at the time, remembering that only the spirit of the party and interests drove that detachment, sponsored by the dictator Antonio López de Santa Anna, whose purposes were, during 27 months of his regime, split the great states of the nation to more easily impose the yoke and the influence of centralist power.

Because of the importance acquired and its marked development, the government of the president Comonfort decreed, on 10 July 1856, the title of city for Carmen, a fact that approved the Congress of the Union on 17 September of that same year. The population, before being part of the state, had already managed to integrate its personality: among the most characteristic neighborhoods were El Guanal, which was populated by families of Palizada, Atasta and San Francisco de Campeche; the del Jesús neighborhood, that of Tila, founded by Yucatecan families who came fleeing from the Caste War; La Puntilla, of fishermen; El Salitral, close to the stream of the French, and that of Fatima, just to name a few.

=== Status creation ===
The conflict in the Yucatán Peninsula, between the politicians Méndez and Barbachano, continued, the caste war did the same.

Major difficulties in the peninsula were presented in 1857 due to irregularities in the election of the state governor, Pantaleón Barrera. Pablo García, who was then 33 years old and had been elected deputy, left the session room of the local Congress in Mérida in July, arguing falsehood of the electoral process. Immediately the uprisings began in different towns, mainly in the Campeche district, asking for new elections to be called; military forces persecuted the rebels, but placated some, others appeared. On the night of 6 August 1857, several Campechanos grouped around García and Pedro Baranda seized the bulwarks of Santiago and the Soledad in San Francisco de Campeche, as well as the artillery mastery. When the negotiations took place, they requested the dismissal of the Campeche City Council for its mendist affiliation, as well as that of the Customs administrator and other conditions that were not entirely justified. Shortly after, on 9 August, Congress and Governor Pantaleón Barrera were unknown in the minutes of that date, due to lack of freedom in the elections. They stopped City Hall and named other people. Pablo García was appointed political and military chief, and began receiving accessions from other places in the district. García's actions to unify in August 1857 the decision of the break with Yucatán, were not easy and he had to exercise the authority he held. Consequently, on the 19th he addressed the political chief of El Carmen asking him not to prevent the free manifestation of the lagoons, of whom he had knowledge that they wished to adhere to his project. He warned him that in order to protect the free expression he had instructed Captain Andrés Cepeda Peraza to disembark in Las Pilas with the forces under his command and, approaching the population, give the inhabitants an opportunity to express their opinions. Days later, thanks to Nicolás Dorantes and Ávila, García learned that he had the support of the lagoons. The fact was not peaceful, since there were victims: Jerónimo Castillo and Santiago Brito, who had resisted García's objectives, died within the proclamation. Likewise, Pablo García separated José del Rosario Gil from the political headquarters of Carmen and sent José García y Poblaciones from Campeche, to whom he also granted the party's military command.

From August to December 1857 numerous populations adhered to the proclamation of García and Barrera left the government in the hands of Martín F. Peraza. For all these reasons, it was no accident that in April 1858 there was a majority consensus for the creation of the new state. On 3 May 1858, the Territorial Division Agreement was signed, which among other points stipulated the respective dividing line, obligations in the war against the natives, taxes and tariffs; It was published in San Francisco de Campeche with the solemnity of the case on 15 May. Immediate consequence of the Agreement was the issuance of a four-point document whereby the Government Board of the District of Campeche and Isla del Carmen declared that it was willing to establish itself in a state, recognizing Pablo García as governor and establishing that the designation of commander would fall in Pedro Baranda; They also appointed a Governing Council that would be integrated with five members. The final decree of the creation of the new state was issued on 29 April 1863. The state was formed with one of the Yucatecan districts: that of Campeche (the others were Mérida, Tekax, Izamal and Valladolid), the district of Campeche was formed by the parties of Carmen, Champotón, Campeche, Hecelchakán and Bolonchenticul. The first governor was Mr. Pablo García y Montilla.

=== French intervention ===
The suspension of the payment of the external debt gave the opportunity to England, Spain and France to get, again, a hegemonic place in Mexico, and sent their fleets to demand payment, arriving at Veracruz in January 1862.

On 12 February, at four in the afternoon, the French war steamer "Le Granade" anchored in the Bay of Carmen, with the excuse landed armaments in the month of May. The struggle between the adherents to the conservative cause and the faithful to the Republic of Juarez became manifest, a meeting of authorities and connoted persons was called and, after a vote, Carmen remained as a French colony, the liberals had Than exile from the city.

In San Francisco de Campeche forces were organized to reconquer the island, the troops of the intervention under the command of Don Pedro Pucurul arrived at Palizada and in San Joaquin they fought. Loyal Carmelites addressed a proclamation to the inhabitants of the island to resist and defend the homeland, among the first was Arturo Shields. In Carmen, nature came to the rescue and the crew of "La Granade" died, in its entirety, of yellow fever, the only one who was saved was Captain Hoquart.

Campeche was the last bulwark of the liberals in the peninsula and after violent fighting they were dominated by the imperialist forces, giving the arrival to the country of Maximilian and Carlota. At the end of 1865, the Empress made a trip to the peninsula arriving at Carmen on 17 December aboard the Tabasco steam.

In early 1866, Pablo Gracia and other loyal Campechens returned to Carmen, entering Tabasco, to reorganize the release of Campeche. On 23 April 1867, the liberal forces, under the command of Don Juan Carbo, and the fleet, under the command of Vicente Campan, entered Carmen to take the place, upon obtaining it they were handed over by the political prefect of the territory José María Ponce.

The state began the path of progress, a statistical report of March 1871 indicated that they had exported to Europe, in the 1861-1870s, the figure of 4 million 650 thousand 139 quintals of dye stick.

Every day there were more than 25 ships of different nationalities docked at the docks and many others were waiting to dock. The dye stick extract plant was established with Belgian and French capital and the first electric current generator for lighting in the country was installed there, it was the year 1874.

=== The Revolution ===
Obeying an economic trend, guided by the transition of land to private individuals, the Porfirio Díaz government handed over large concessions to foreign companies and connoted people in the region.

At the end of 1907, in El Carmen, two groups faced conflicting ideas, the one of friends of the Porfirian regime called "Club dos de Abril", who met at the pharmacy of Don Jesus Cervera, and the other called "The hornet", who met in the pharmacy of Carlos González l.

On 11 September, at the beginning of his campaign, Don Francisco I. Madero arrived by boat to Carmen from Tabasco, accompanied by his wife, Sara Pérez de Madero, from the graduates José María Pino Suárez and Serapio Rendón and other supporters and collaborators from Tabasco. At night there was a rally in Zaragoza square, where Pino Suárez, Rendón and Madero himself took the floor.

Once the power was reached in 1912, there was a great economic collapse, the dissatisfied against President Madero faced a frank struggle, the Porfiristas for their part, struggled to regain power, all these facts led the country to the Ten Tragic Days. In the state the governor Manuel Castilla Brito rebelled.

In July 1914, Victoriano Huerta's forces were in frank defeat, Venustiano Carranza became the head of the revolution. Among the officers of the Venustiano Carranza pre-constitutional army, came the young Joaquín Mucel Acereto, who had lived in Carmen since childhood and abandoned his engineering studies at the beginning of the movement. Colonel Mucel is sent as chief of arms and governor. With the arrival of Mucel, several young Carmelites decided to enlist in the army, among them, Ramón Arcovedo, Ramón Vadillo, Alfonso Rosiñol del Valle, Benjamin Pérez, Marcos Almeida and José Ruiz.

=== From shrimp to oil ===
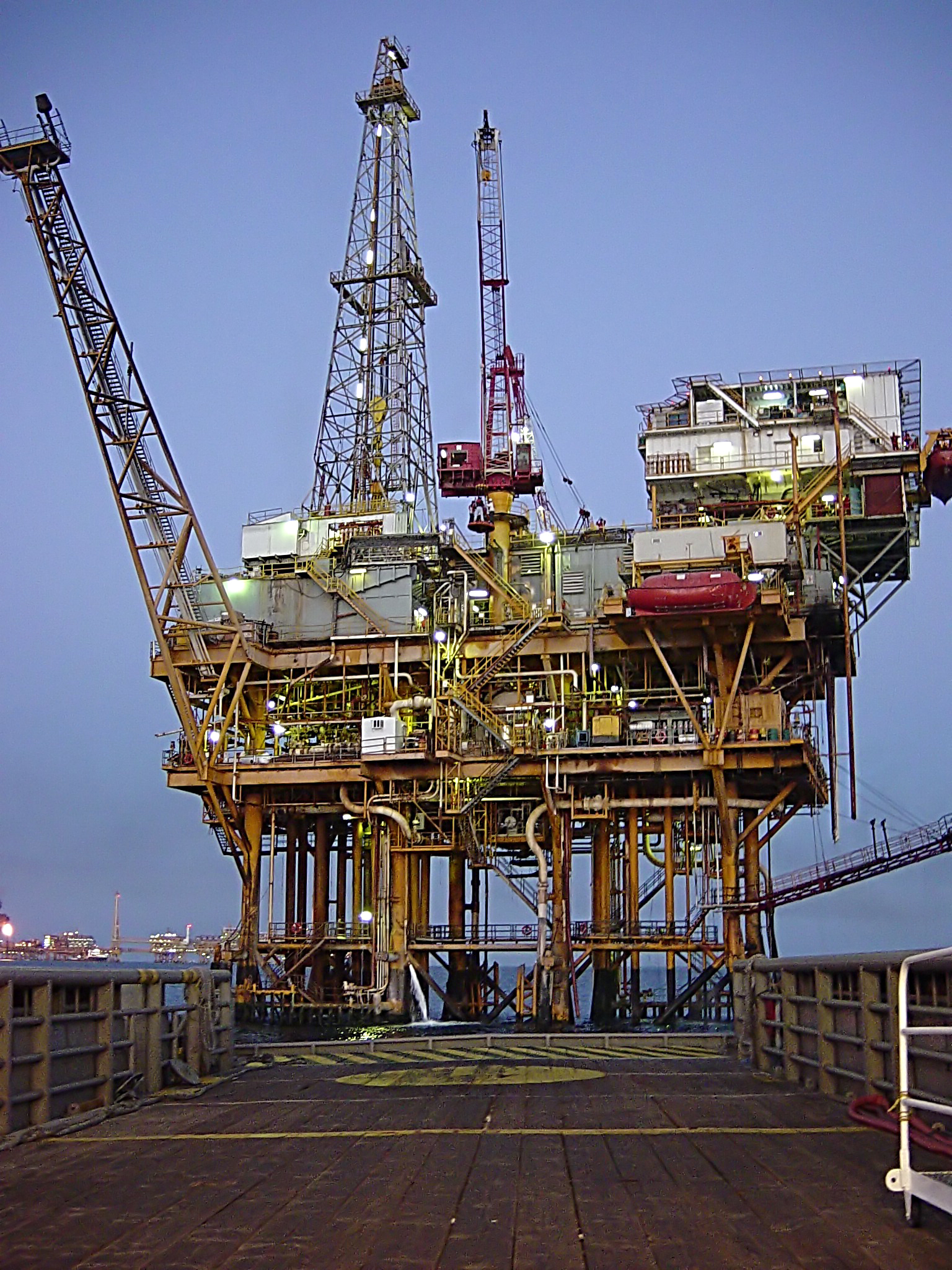
Oil platform near Ciudad del Carmen

Between 1946 and 1947, the inhabitants of the Isla del Carmen were looking for a way out of their economic crisis, according to data from Leriche, several were the projects that had in mind, from a great hotel until a factory of buttons, of all these projects the only one that was consummated was the installation of seafood packers. While these possibilities were being discussed on the island, domestic and foreign shrimp companies increased their presence on the coasts of Carmen, where the virgin [pink shrimp] banks of the Gulf were located.

Shrimp activity had an anarchic start, somewhat chaotic; however, it would mark Carmen's economy for the next 35 years. The benefits between this industry and those that preceded it, such as dye stick and precious wood, allowed the diversification of occupational activities in the region.

The discovery of oil, by fisherman Rudesindo Cantarell in March 1971 off the coast of Carmen, meant a new stage in the life of the city and an element of great importance in the destiny of the country.

=== 21st century ===
At the beginning of the 21st century, oil extraction began to decrease. With that came a gradual decline of the shrimp industry, so as a result, in recent years Ciudad del Carmen has sought to diversify its economy to other sectors like tourism, and real estate companies.

Starting in the second half of 2014, international prices of oil fell drastically, forcing Mexican state-owned oil company Petróleos Mexicanos to make cuts in its budgets and halt more oil explorations. In the first years of the 2020s decade, the federal promise of moving the central offices of Pemex from Mexico City to Carmen had been discussed, which drew significant attention for a possible reactivation in the economy of the island.

Today, the city’s economy relies highly in the local economy, after the slow gradual closing of many international businesses after the high reliance of local businesses with payment from state-owned Pemex.

== Tourism ==
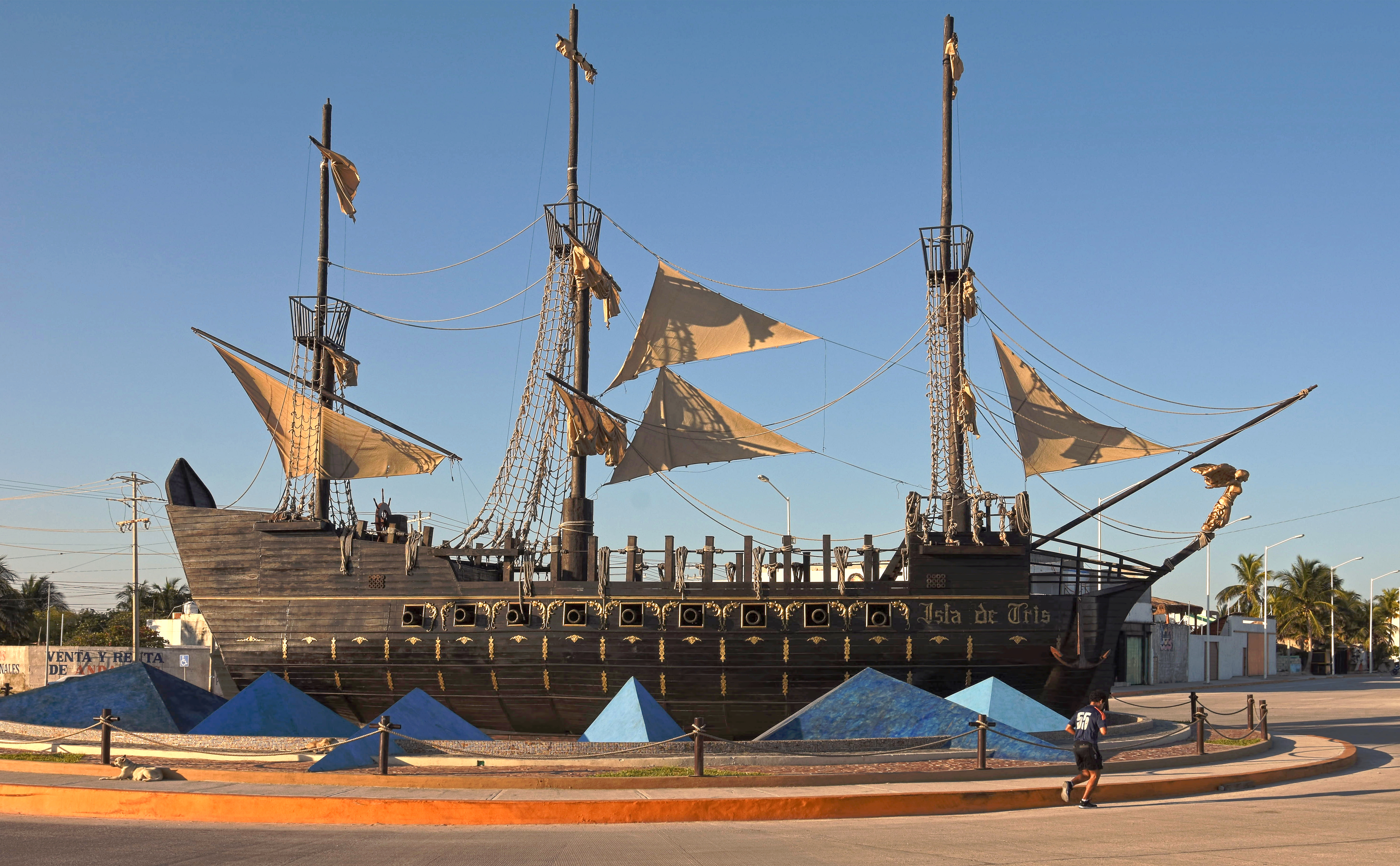
The Barco del Galeón located at the right end of the Malecón Costero, inaugurated in 2021

The Laguna de Términos Flora and Fauna Protection Area has an extension of 705,016 hectares, which makes it one of the largest Protected Natural Areas in Mexico. In 2004 it was declared a Ramsar Convention site.

=== Beaches ===
Ciudad del Carmen has a vast number of beaches, among which the following are notable:

- Playa Sabancuy

Playa Sabancuy is known for its fine white sand, with some areas of shells. Its waters are shallow, with generally calm waves and a gentle slope.

- Playa Manigua

Playa Manigua is characterized by calm waves and clear water. The beach is popularly used for recreational activities, including water sports, and it is frequented by both residents and visitors.

- Playa Bahamita

Playa Bahamita is a local beach known for its soft sand and calm waters. It is commonly used for swimming or simply sunbathing and relaxing.

- Playita Inclusiva

The Inclusive Beach (Playita Inclusiva) is a public space located in the Puntilla district in southwestern Ciudad del Carmen. It is a public space aimed for people with disabilities to enjoy the local beach without any obstacles. The public beach was inaugurated in 2018, with a second one opening in the Playa Norte zone in March 2026.

=== Parque Zaragoza ===
The Kiosk of the Zaragoza park, built in 1886

The Zaragoza park (Parque Zaragoza, also known originally as Plaza de Armas) is a public park located in the Centro district of the city. Named after Mexican army officer Ignacio Zaragoza (1829-1862), it is surrounded by buildings of traditional architectural style and includes seating areas, playground facilities and a fountain area. Cultural and community events are periodically held at the site. The iconic kiosk located in the center of the park, was built in 1886 (rebuilt in 1905) made out of wooden materials, and a bronze roof.

=== Malecón Costero ===
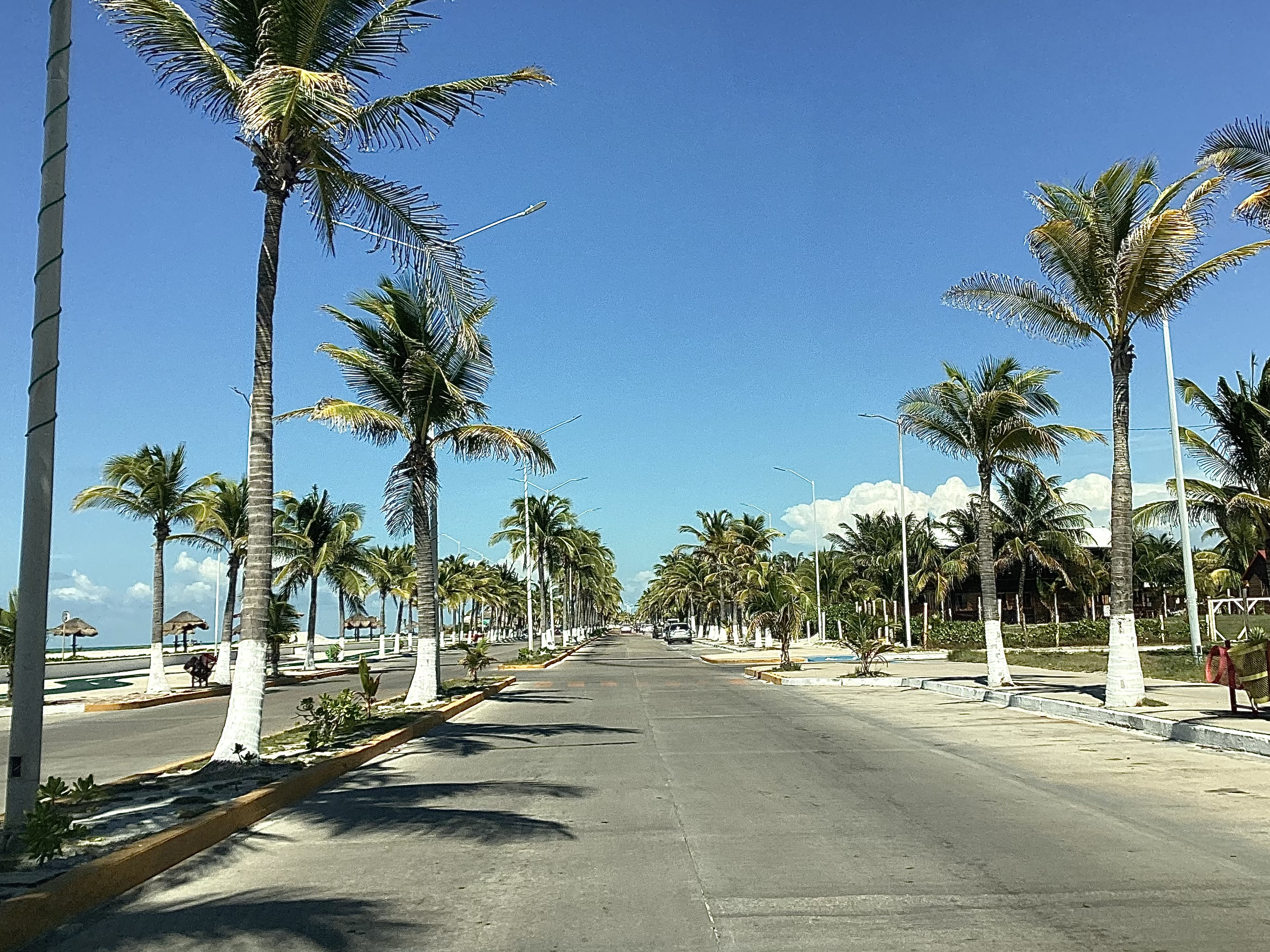
The Malecón Costero, popular touristic avenue with restaurants

The Malecón Costero is a coastal promenade located north of the city. It features sculptures, seafood restaurants and playgrounds. The promenade offers views of the Gulf of Mexico. Its first phase was opened in 2016, consisting simply of spaces with benches, a monument to Carmelita baseball player Nelson Barrera Romellón, and elevated crosswalks. The second phase was completed in 2020, with a longer bycicle lane, more space for restaurants and one year later, the inauguration of the Barco del Galeón, a 26-meter long pirate boat sculpture, which was inaugurated on September 14, 2021.

=== Botanical Garden of the Universidad Autónoma del Carmen ===
The botanical garden is located within the campus of the Autonomous University of Carmen. It is dedicated to the preservation and study of regional plant species and serves as a site for environmental education and research.

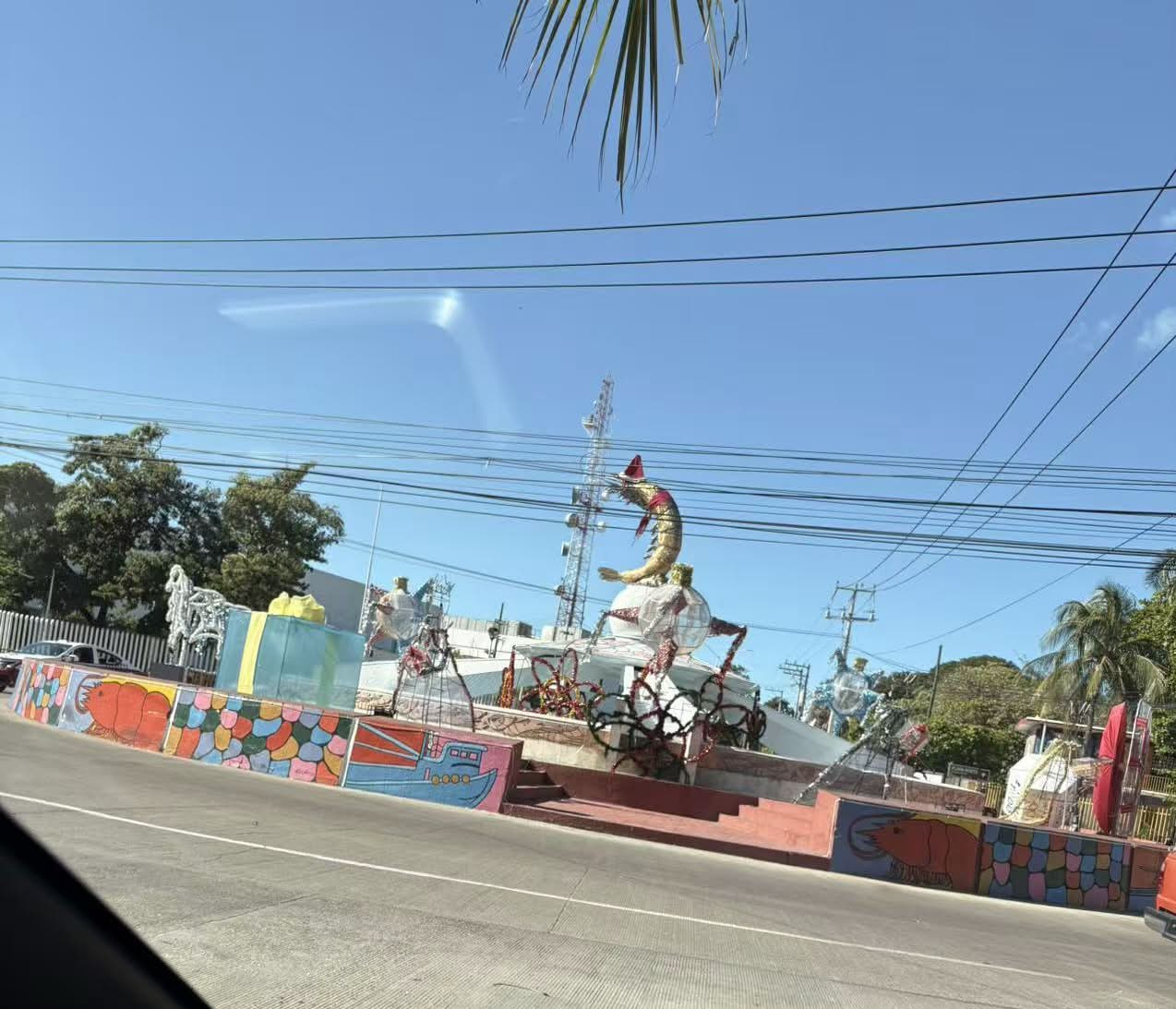
The Glorieta del Carmarón’s annual decorations for Christmas, 2025

=== Glorieta del Camarón (Roundabout of the Shrimp) ===
The Roundabout of the Shrimp (Glorieta del Camarón) is one of the most representative landmarks in Ciudad del Carmen, located in the intersection between the Aviación and Juárez avenues. Built in 1967 to pay homage to the city’s fishing industry, this roundabout, featuring an iconic sculpture of a shrimp, has become an urban symbol and a popular spot for both locals and visitors. In addition to its aesthetic value, the roundabout reflects part of Carmen's cultural and economic identity, linked to fishing and coastal life. It underwent renovations in 2006, changing the shape of the roundabout itself from an oval to a circle, and the shrimp was temporarily retired for its maintenance. It was polished again in 2022. Locally, it is a landmark site for protests and local celebrations.

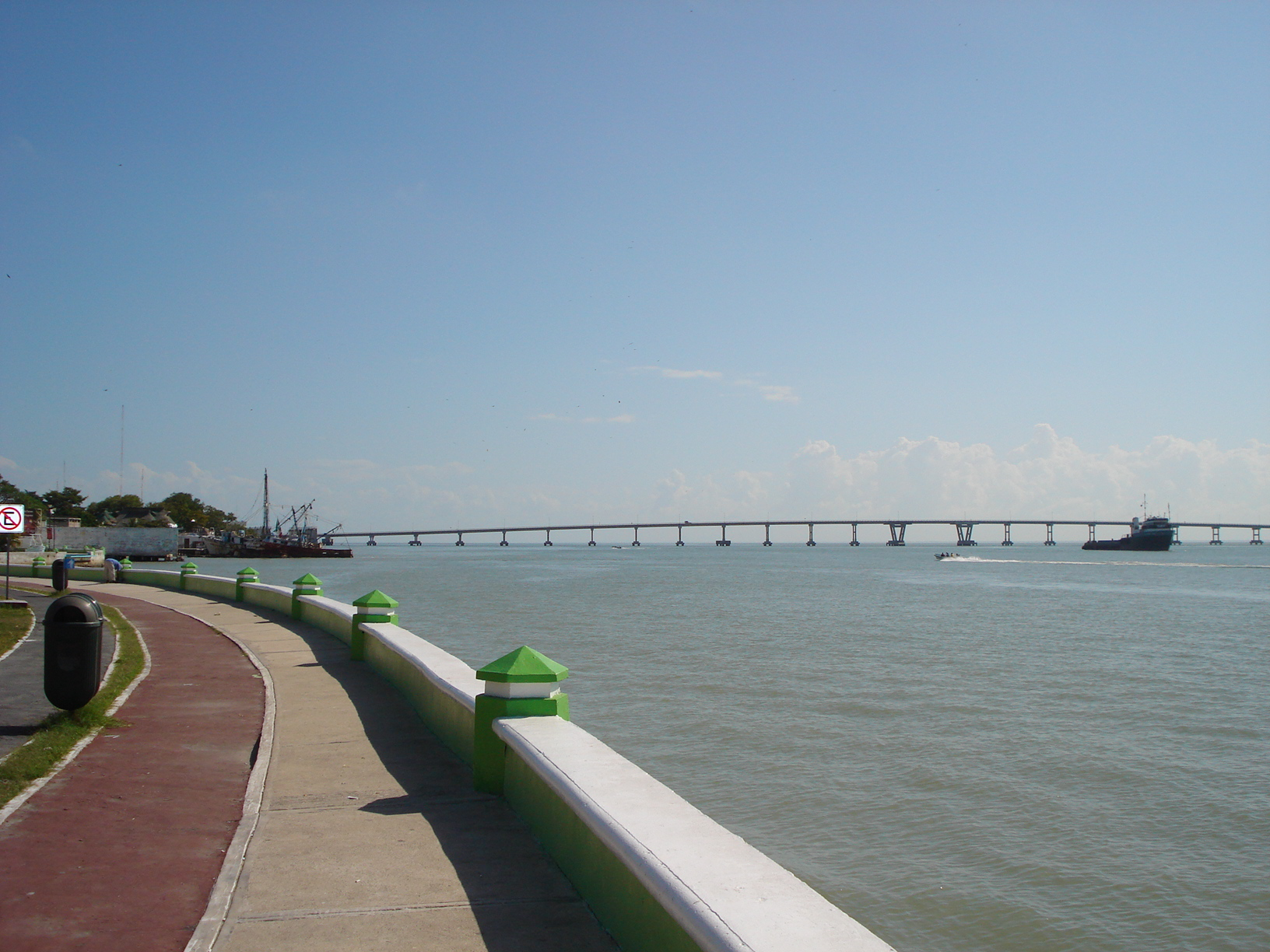
The Zacatal Bridge and the city’s Malecón.

=== El Zacatal Bridge ===
The El Zacatal bridge is the longest bridge in Latin America of its kind, with a length of 3861 meters and a width of 9 meters. It is one of the busiest in the country as it is the entrance to the Yucatán Peninsula, it has two lanes, one in each direction, passable by any type of vehicle.

== Urbanism ==
In 2009, the Municipal Planning Institute, an organization created to promote integral and long-term development, directing the information and strategic planning processes of the municipality of Carmen, presented the Urban Director Program of Ciudad del Carmen, called: "A beautiful, competitive, sustainable and inclusive city", commemorates a project execution horizon in the short, medium and long term and a review period of every three years.

Among the topics addressed in the Urban Director Program are the land use and destination planning, policies by areas and conservation, improvement and growth actions and urban development policies and guidelines for the prevention of phenomena risks natural and man-made. The urban development norms on the road structure, transport, infrastructure and public services and the secondary zoning of land uses and destinations to which urban areas and land susceptible to urbanization can be dedicated were also taken into account. In the same way, the zoning regulations that regulate in each of the zones that are established: the permitted and prohibited uses and destinations of the land, the density and intensity in the use of the land, minimum surface of urban lots, surface and height maximum that can be built, lateral construction restrictions, parking requirements and other urban structure standards. Among other things.

=== Occupation strategy of the Isla del Carmen ===
The planning approach established in the new Urban Director Program considers that:

Ciudad del Carmen is integrated into the natural area of Isla del Carmen, so it is necessary to strengthen the unity and harmonic relations between the city and its environment. In this sense, it will seek to promote the adequate development of the island complex that will ensure the patrimonial integrity of the island by promoting actions aimed at the conservation, protection and restoration of the natural environment, as well as the use of the building. According to the current conditions and the new planning instruments at the municipal and regional level, the areas previously considered as part of the urban system of cities of Carmen, can now be established as population centers that are part of a broader regional system.

In this way, Isla del Carmen is defined as the population center of Ciudad del Carmen and includes the urban area of the city with its reserve, Lagartera or Isla Media and Puerto Real. The city can be considered as an industrial and business tourism center, it will include the urban area and areas of economic activities such as services related to the exploitation of oil, but areas for economic activities will also be promoted parallel to that of Petroleum such as tourism and fishing; in the Lagartera or Media Island area, tourist use, fishing and activities related to these activities will prevail. On the other hand, Puerto Real will have a low intensity tourism development related to low impact tourism. The programs consulted in the elaboration of the PDU were:

- Plan de Manejo de Flora y Fauna de la Laguna de Términos elaborado en 1997.
- Programa Municipal de Ordenamiento Ecológico y Territorial de Carmen, Campeche.
- Programa Regional de Desarrollo Turístico del Corredor Costero, Ciudad de San Francisco de Campeche-Ciudad del Carmen.

== Geography ==
Ciudad del Carmen is located on an island covering an area of 11,513 hectares (28,449 acres), the island is 40 kilometres (25 mi) in length and is 6 to 8 kilometres (4 to 5 mi) in its widest parts. The island is mainly 2 to 3 metres (6 ft 7 in to 9 ft 10 in) above sea level.

=== Climate ===
Like most of the cities along the Yucatán's Gulf Coast, Ciudad del Carmen exhibits a tropical savanna climate (Köppen climate classification Aw). The city, situated on Carmen Island, has a pronounced dry season that lasts from January through May, with the wet season finishing out the year. September and October bring copious rainfall, with both months averaging well over 200 millimeters.

Climate data for Ciudad del Carmen (El Carmen) 1991-2020
Month	Jan	Feb	Mar	Apr	May	Jun	Jul	Aug	Sep	Oct	Nov	Dec	Year
Record high °C (°F)	42.0 (107.6)	41.0 (105.8)	45.0 (113.0)	43.0 (109.4)	44.0 (111.2)	41.0 (105.8)	38.5 (101.3)	40.0 (104.0)	41.0 (105.8)	39.0 (102.2)	41.0 (105.8)	41.0 (105.8)	45.0 (113.0)
Mean daily maximum °C (°F)	28.1 (82.6)	29.7 (85.5)	31.7 (89.1)	34.2 (93.6)	35.0 (95.0)	33.8 (92.8)	33.4 (92.1)	33.0 (91.4)	32.5 (90.5)	31.4 (88.5)	29.8 (85.6)	28.6 (83.5)	31.8 (89.2)
Daily mean °C (°F)	23.9 (75.0)	25.0 (77.0)	26.6 (79.9)	28.8 (83.8)	29.8 (85.6)	29.1 (84.4)	28.7 (83.7)	28.5 (83.3)	28.2 (82.8)	27.3 (81.1)	25.6 (78.1)	24.5 (76.1)	27.2 (81.0)
Mean daily minimum °C (°F)	19.7 (67.5)	20.3 (68.5)	21.5 (70.7)	23.5 (74.3)	24.6 (76.3)	24.5 (76.1)	24.0 (75.2)	24.0 (75.2)	23.9 (75.0)	23.2 (73.8)	21.4 (70.5)	20.4 (68.7)	22.6 (72.7)
Record low °C (°F)	10.0 (50.0)	10.0 (50.0)	9.0 (48.2)	13.0 (55.4)	14.0 (57.2)	14.0 (57.2)	18.9 (66.0)	18.8 (65.8)	17.0 (62.6)	16.5 (61.7)	12.0 (53.6)	11.0 (51.8)	9.0 (48.2)
Average precipitation mm (inches)	65.1 (2.56)	39.7 (1.56)	34.3 (1.35)	26.7 (1.05)	72.9 (2.87)	217.5 (8.56)	146.4 (5.76)	190.5 (7.50)	262.1 (10.32)	225.3 (8.87)	122.2 (4.81)	67.8 (2.67)	1,470.5 (57.89)
Average precipitation days (≥ 0.1 mm)	7.7	4.8	3.8	2.6	5.6	14.4	14.8	16.2	17.6	15.2	9.2	7.4	119.3
Source: Servicio Meteorologico Nacional

== Sister cities ==
=== International ===
- Aarhus, Denmark
- Matanzas, Cuba
- Marianao, Cuba
- Cárdenas, Cuba
- Barrancabermeja, Colombia
- Puerto Madryn, Argentina
- Funchal, Portugal
- Aberdeen, Scotland
- Mobile, Alabama, United States
- Wilmington, North Carolina, United States

=== National ===
- Mérida, Yucatán, Mexico
- San Francisco de Campeche, Mexico
- San Miguel de Cozumel, Quintana Roo, Mexico
- Boca del Río, Veracruz, Mexico
