= Pantanos de Centla =

Wooded wetlands along the coast of Tabasco, Mexico

Coordinates: 18°20′N 92°30′W

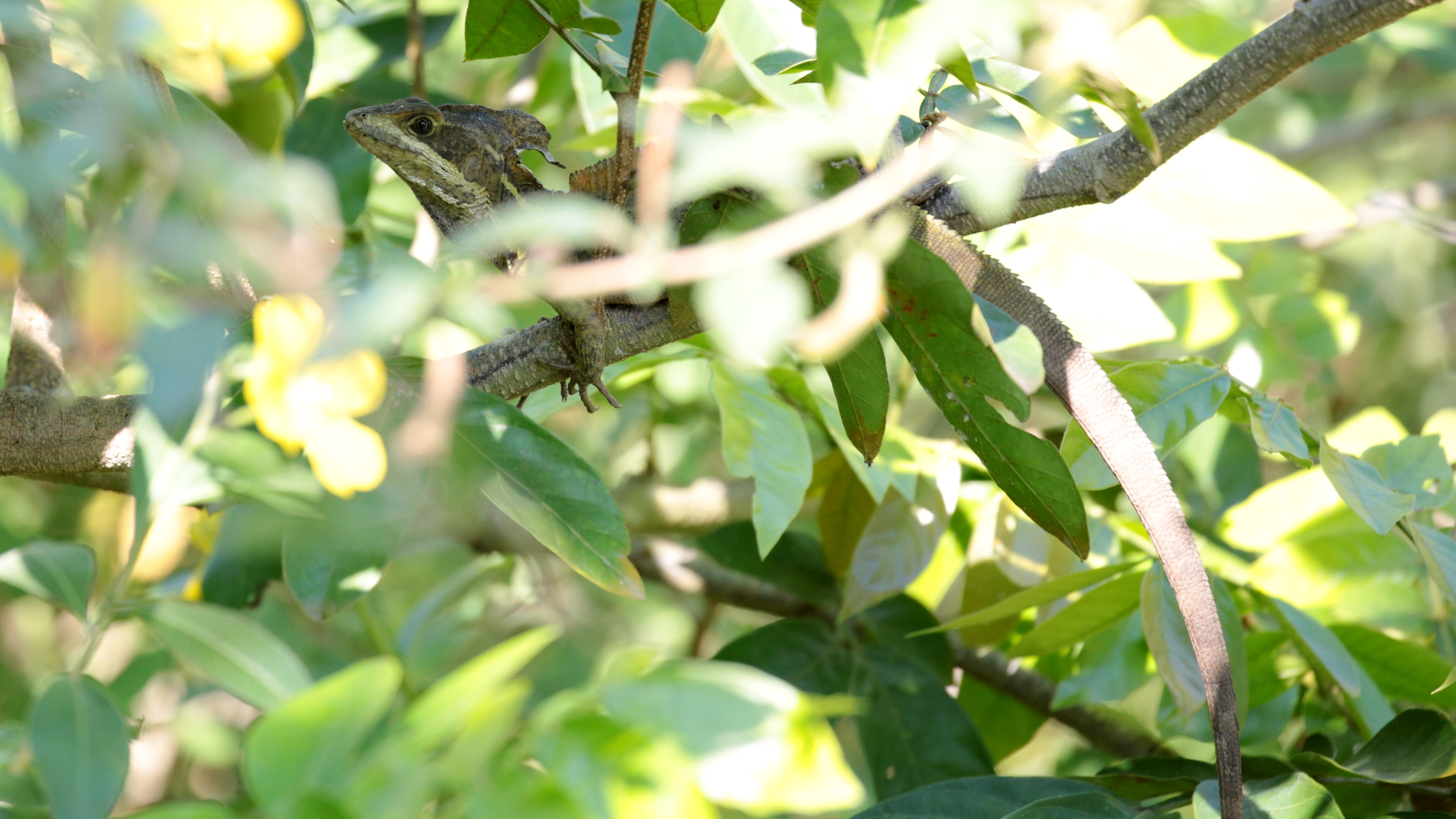
- Brown basilisk (toloque rayado) in the Pantanos de Centla

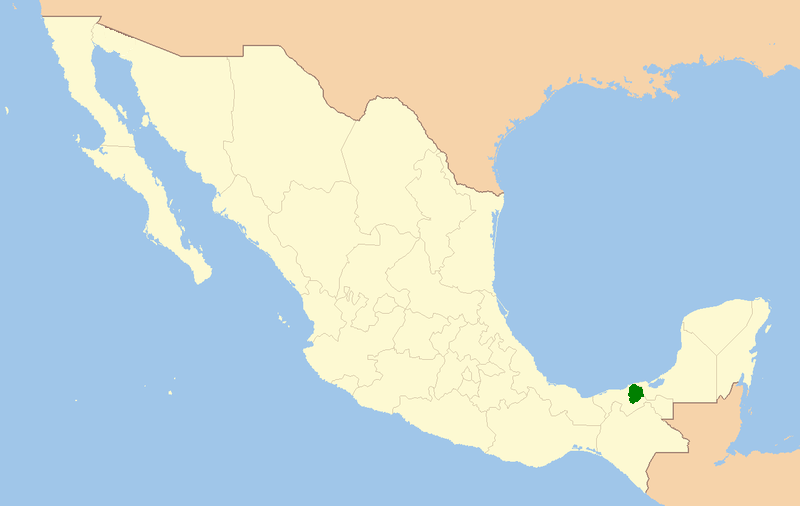
- Location map of the Pantanos de Centla

Ecology
- Realm: Neotropical
- Biome: tropical and subtropical moist broadleaf forests
- Borders: Petén–Veracruz moist forests; Usumacinta mangroves, Yucatan moist forests

Geography
- Area: 17,028 km^{2} (6,575 mi^{2})
- Country: Mexico
- States: Campeche; Chiapas; Tabasco

Conservation
- Conservation status: Critical/endangered
- Protected: 5,644 km^{2} (33%)

Designations

Ramsar Wetland
- Official name: Reserva de la Biosfera Pantanos de Centla
- Designated: 22 June 1995
- Reference no.: 733

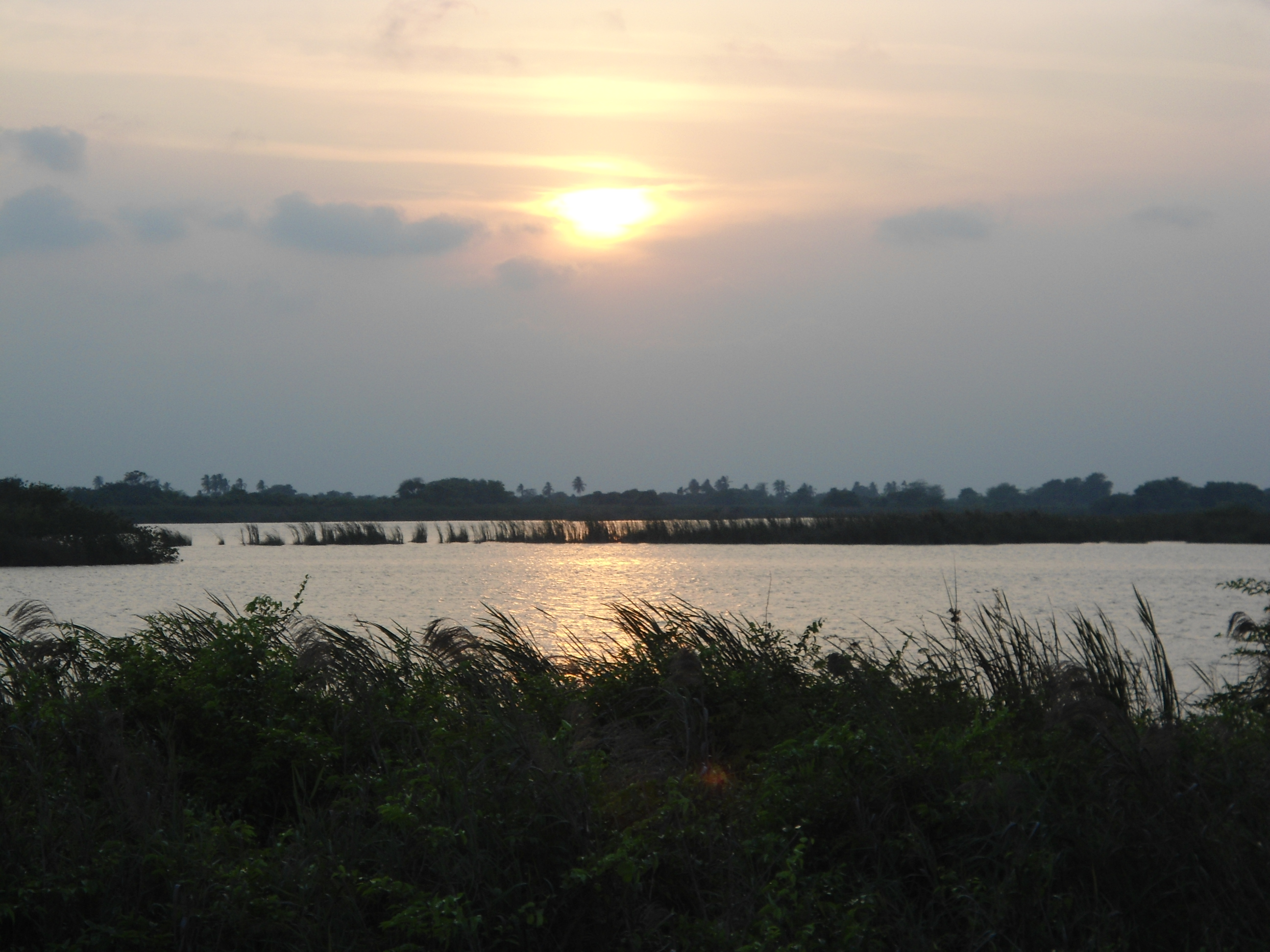
View of the Centla, Tabasco.

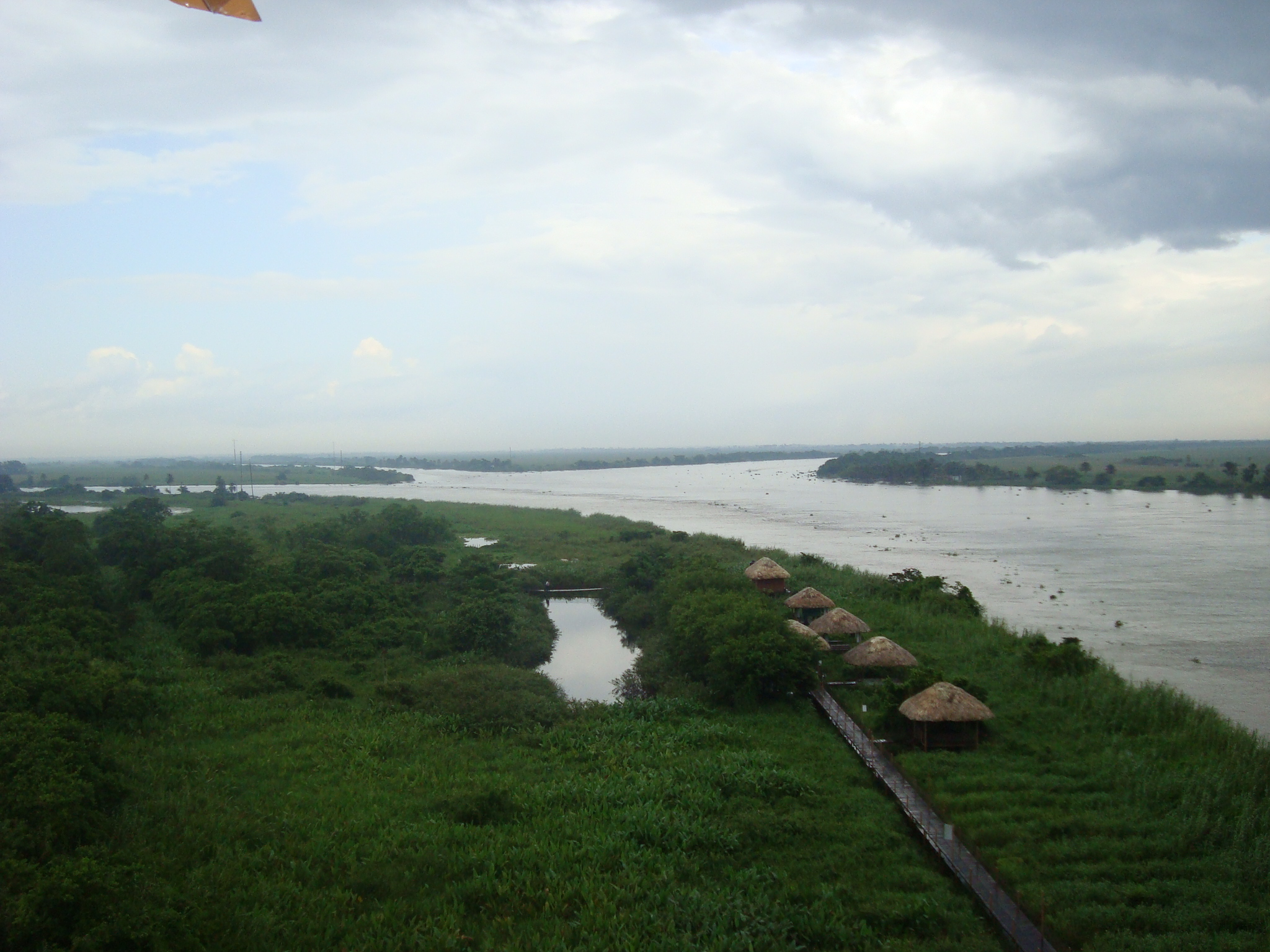
In "Tres Brazos" the Usumacinta River joins the San Pedrito and Grijalva rivers in the Pantanos de Centla Biosphere Reserve.

The Pantanos de Centla (Centla swamps) are wooded wetlands along the coast in state of Tabasco in Mexico. They have been protected since 2006 with the establishment of the Pantanos de Centla Biosphere Reserve. It is also a World Wildlife Fund ecoregion.

== WWF Ecoregion ==
The ecoregion covers an area of 17,200 square kilometers (6,600 sq mi) in the states of Tabasco, Chiapas, and Campeche. The Centla swamps occupy the delta of the Usumacinta and Grijalva rivers, which empty into the Gulf of Mexico and the Laguna de Términos through numerous distributaries. The ecoregion includes year-round wetlands, and freshwater swamp forests which are inundated during the summer rainy season.

The Usumacinta mangroves lie in the brackish-water zone between the Centla swamps and the open water of the Laguna de Términos and the Gulf. The Petén–Veracruz moist forests lie to the west and south, and the Yucatan moist forests lie to the east.

A 2017 assessment found that 5,644 km^{2}, or 33%, of the ecoregion is in protected areas. The largest protected area is Pantanos de Centla Biosphere Reserve.

== Pantanos de Centla Biosphere Reserve ==
=== Flora ===
In the Pantanos de Centla Biosphere Reserve (Reserva de la Biosfera Pantanos de Centla) was established in 2006. The reserve mostly contains semi-evergreen forest habitat. The predominant trees in the semi-evergreen forest include black olive tree (Bucida buceras) and logwood (Haematoxylum campechianum), with Spondias mombin, Tabebuia rosea, Lonchocarpus hondurensis, bitter angelim (Vatairea lundelii), gumbo-limbo (Bursera simaruba), guanandis (Calophyllum brasiliense), mahogany (Swietenia macrophylla), and cedar (Cedrela odorata). Wetland plant communities, including marshlands and freshwater swamp forests, cover over a third of the reserve. Species recorded growing in the riparian vegetation along a stream found the free-floating hydrophytes Eichhornia crassipes, Pistia stratiotes and Salvinia auriculata; emergents such as espadaño (Typha latifolia) and carrizo (Gynerium saggitatum); riparian shrubs and trees such as muco (Dalbergia browni) anona (Anona glabra), water zapote (Pachira aquatica), bolchiche (Coccoloba barbadensis, worm tree (Lonchocarpus hondurensis), tucuy (Pithecelobium lanceolatum) and guano palms (Sabal mexicana) as well as some non-native grasses.

=== Fauna ===
Some large animals in the Biosphere Reserve include Morelet's crocodile (Crocodylus moreleti), jaguar (Panthera onca), mantled howler monkey (Alouatta palliata), and tropical gar or pejelagarto (Atractosteus tropicus).

230 species of birds have been recorded in the Biosphere Reserve, of which 63% are permanent residents, 23% winter residents, 4% transitory, and 10% do not have a defined seasonality. The ecoregion's wetlands are home to many water birds, including jabiru stork (Jabiru mycteria), Maguari stork (Ciconia maguari), boat-billed heron or páspaque (Cochlearius cochlearius), ruddy ground dove (Columbina talpacoti), Muscovy duck (Cairina moschata), black-bellied whistling duck (Dendrocygna autumnalis), pied-billed grebe (Podilymbus podiceps), peregrine falcon (Falco peregrinus), and white ibis (Eudocimus albus).

Central American river turtles (Dermatemys mawii) occur in the reserve.

== See also ==
- List of ecoregions in Mexico
