= Usumacinta River =

River in Guatemala and Mexico

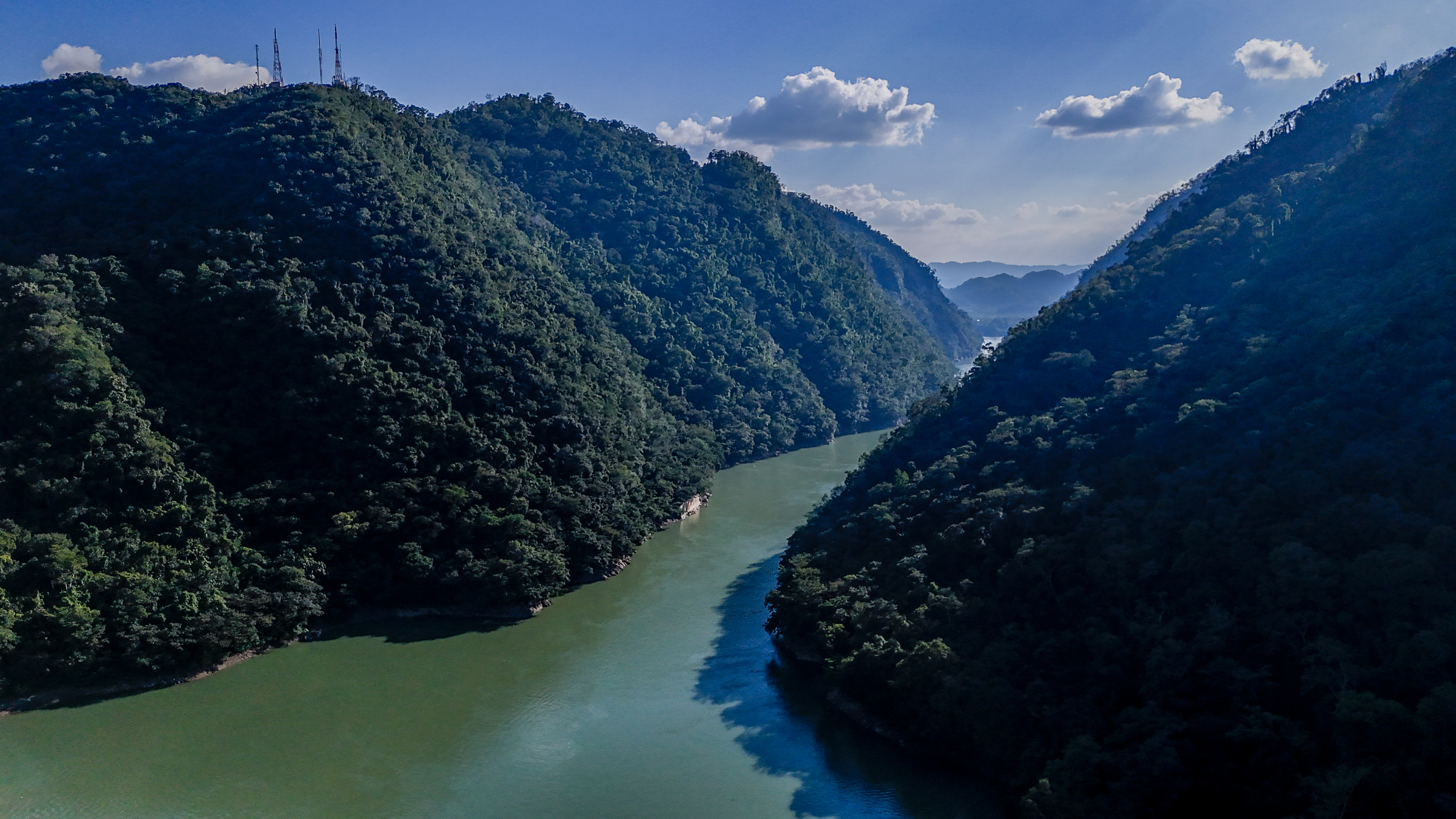
- Usumacinta Canyon, Tenosique, Tabasco
- Native name: Río Usumacinta (Spanish)

Location
- Countries: Guatemala and Mexico
- State: Tabasco, Chiapas
- Municipality: Tenosique, Balancán, Emiliano Zapata, Jonuta and Centla

Physical characteristics
- Source: Confluence of Chixoy River and Pasión River
  - location: Esperanza, Petén Department, Guatemala
  - coordinates: 16°N 90.542942°W
- Mouth: Gulf of Mexico
  - coordinates: 18°38′58.20″N 92°28′4.0″W
  - elevation: 0 m (0 ft)
- Length: 1,000 km (620 mi)

Basin features
- Tributaries
  - left: Grijalva River; Lacantun River
  - right: Pasión River; Salamá River; Rio Carchela

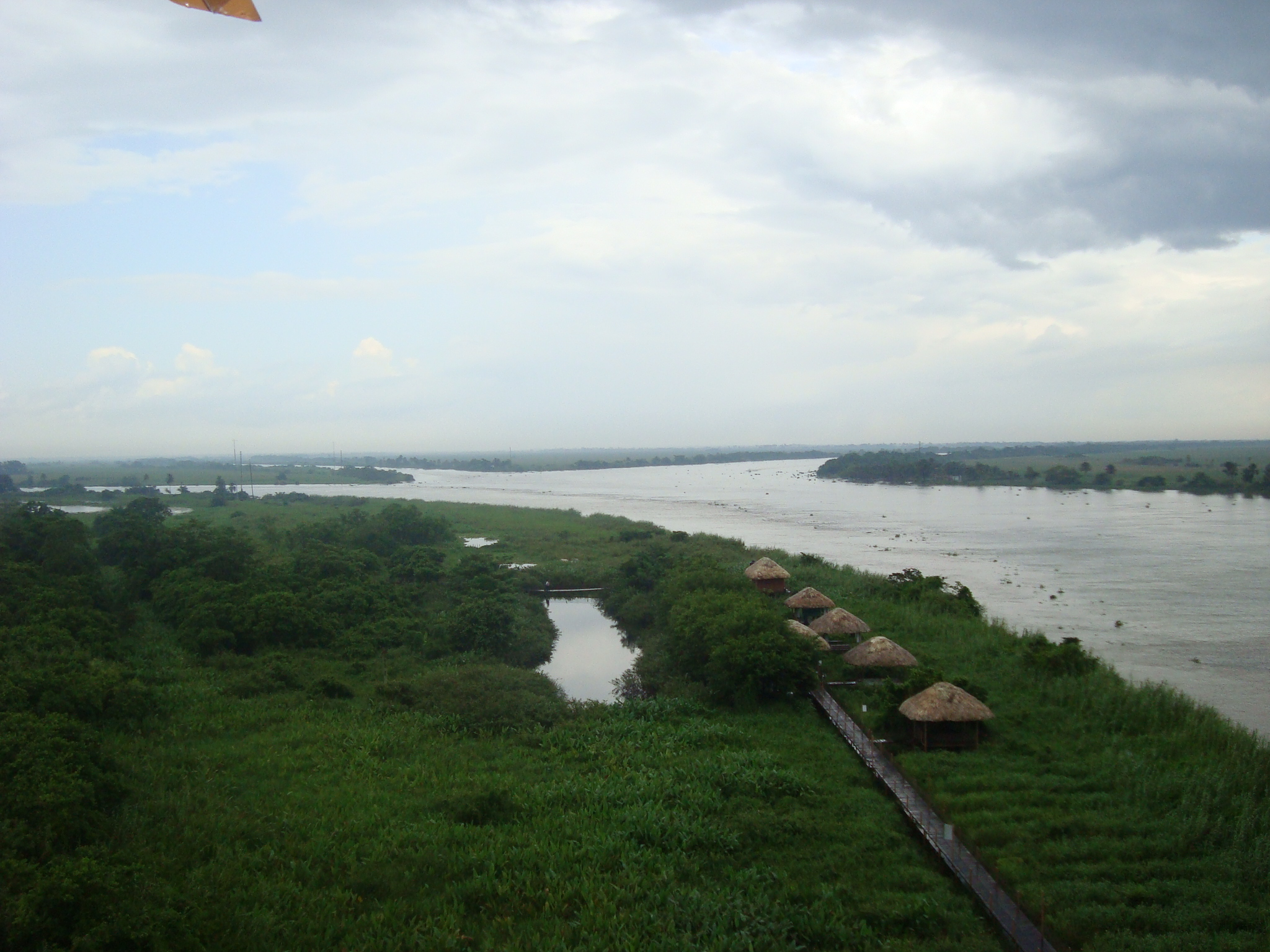
In "Tres Brazos" the Usumacinta joins to San Pedrito river and Grijalva river, in the Wetlands of Centla, biosphere reserve, in Tabasco.

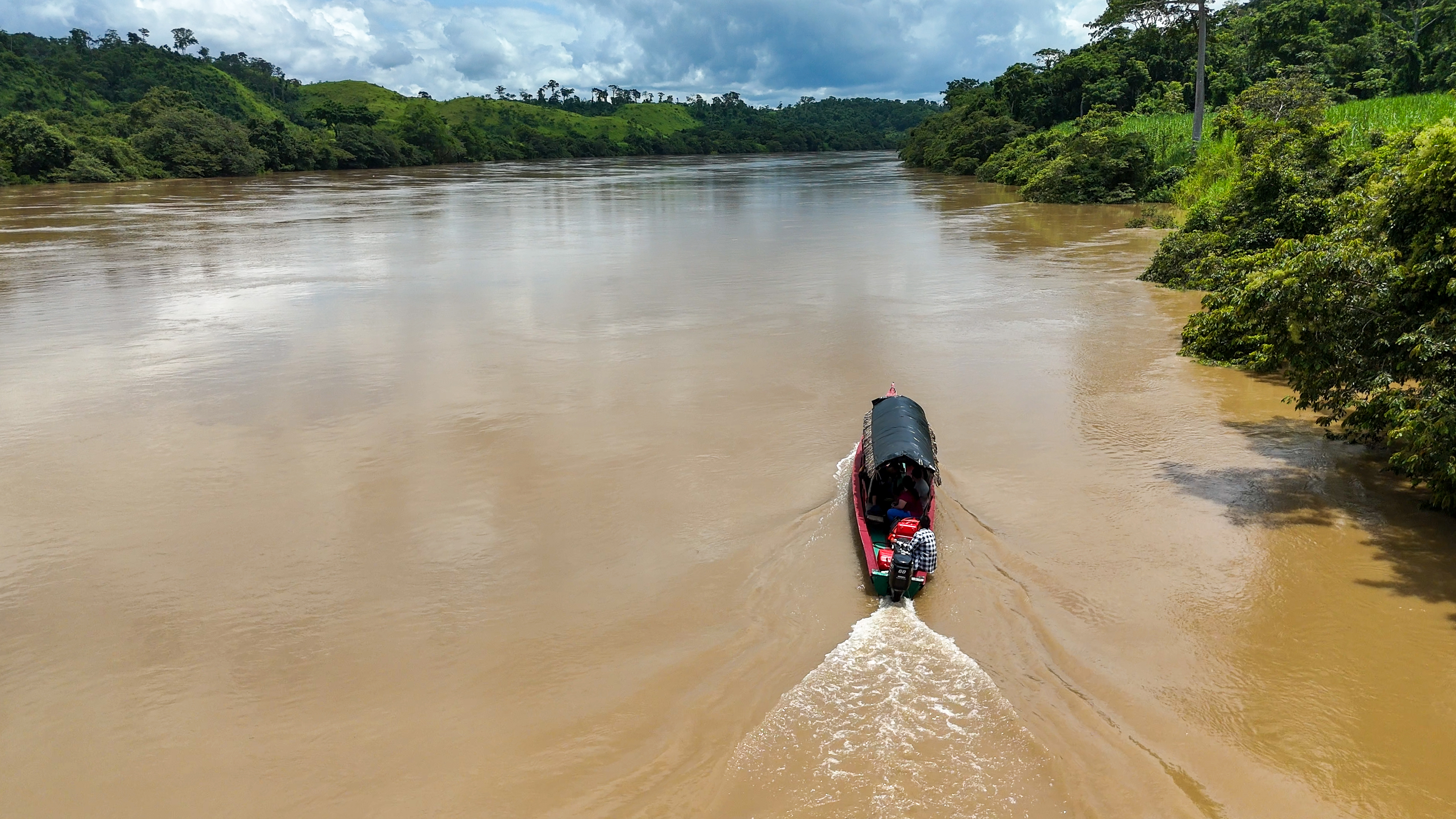
A motorboat sailing on the Usumacinta River. One bank is Guatemala; the other is Mexico.

The Usumacinta River (Spanish pronunciation: [usumaˈsinta]; named after the howler monkey) is a river in southeastern Mexico and northwestern Guatemala. It is formed by the junction of the Pasión River, which arises in the Sierra de Santa Cruz (in Guatemala) and the Salinas River, also known as the Rio Chixoy, or the Rio Negro, which descends from the Sierra Madre de Guatemala. It defines part of the border between Guatemala and the Mexican state of Chiapas, then continues its northwesterly course, meandering through the Mexican state of Tabasco to the Gulf of Mexico.

The Usumacinta River enters Mexican territory in the state of Tabasco and across the Cañón del Usumacinta (Usumacinta Canyon) ecological reserve, forming impressive canyons along its route. Passing the canyon called "Boca del Cerro", Tenosique, the Usumacinta goes into the plain of Tabasco.

Two distributaries, the Palizada River and San Pedro y San Pablo River, branch from the main stem of the Usumacinta and empty north and east into the Laguna de Términos. In Tabasco the Grijalva River flows into the Usumacinta River. This confluence is at Tres Brazos, Centla, and the two rivers form a large wetland region known as the Pantanos de Centla. The pantanos (wetlands) are designated a biosphere reserve; it contains 302,702 hectares (747,990 acres), which makes it the largest protected wetland region in North and Central America and one of the top 15 wetlands (by size) in the world.

The total length of the river, including the Salinas, Chixoy, Negro rivers in Guatemala is approximately 1,000 kilometres (620 mi). It is the only visible natural boundary separating the Yucatán Peninsula from the rest of Mexico.

== History ==
The river and its tributaries were important trade routes for the ancient Maya civilization. Yaxchilan and Piedras Negras, two of the most powerful cities of the Maya Classic Period, lie along its banks. Because of artistic similarities between Yaxchilan and Chinkultic, another Maya site, there seems to have been some sort of artistic communication between this region and western Maya sites.

Before roads, such as the Border Highway constructed by the Mexican Government in the early 1990s, penetrated the jungle, the river was the only means of travel in this region. Huge trunks of hardwood trees were floated downriver to the state of Tabasco.

In the 1980s, many Guatemalan refugees fled across the river to relative safety in Mexico. Other groups of refugees and Guatemalan guerrillas formed the so-called CPR communities in the jungle on the Guatemalan shores, hiding from the government until the peace accords of the nineties.

Frans and Trudi Blom first brought the idea of conservation to the watershed in the 1950s by proposing that a section of the Selva Lacandona be reserved for the Lacandon Maya. Their idea was as much the preservation of culture as of habitat, and this principle – that indigenous integrity and habitat are inextricably linked in the watershed – should help guide any future conservation planning. Conservationists working in the region, such as Nacho March, Ron Nigh, Fernando Ochoa, Roan Balas McNab and others, have all acknowledged and upheld the principle in their work.

The first large hydroelectric project on the Usumacinta in "Boca del Cerro", Tenosique, Tabasco, was proposed in the 1980s, and would have stretched all the way up the Pasion and Lacantun tributaries, flooding Piedras Negras and Yaxchilan, among other known and unknown Maya sites. At that time, the Guatemalan shore was held by rebels, whose presence discouraged illegal logging, poaching, and looting. It also discouraged dam engineers. In 1985 Jefferey Wilkerson's groundbreaking article in National Geographic brought the river and its glories to widespread public consciousness for the first time. Additionally, the Guatemalan journalist Victor Perera wrote about the river in The Nation and in his books, The Last Lords of Palenque and Unfinished Conquest, and Jan de Vos chronicled the region in his magisterial series of histories. Ultimately the hydro project failed under the weight of its own disincentives: siltation, geology, seismic activity, distance from markets, politics, etc., but the outcry from conservationists, archeologists, writers, and the public helped. It also established a pattern.

A thriving seasonal business in wilderness tourism began after the Wilkerson article. The river and its environs became a favorite destination of river travelers, amateur Mayanists and archaeologists, birders and wildlife tourists.

Carlos Salinas de Gortari proposed a smaller but still monumental hydro project in 1990, and completed the periferico surrounding the Montes Azules reserve. Articles in The New York Times and op-ed pieces by Homero Aridjis suggesting a binational reserve for the area, helped defeat this incarnation of the idea.

In the late 1990s, a consortium of scientists, and government and non-governmental organizations met in San Cristóbal de las Casas, under the auspices of the Wildlife Conservation Society and the University of Florida, to identify the extent and types of habitat remaining the region, and to draw maps of the watershed. The conference addressed many of the jurisdictional and administrative questions that still bedevil the idea.

The Zapatista Rebellion in 1994 and 1995, and the Guatemalan peace accords in 1996, reshaped the political lines in the watershed. As a direct consequence, and with the dramatic fall of the peso, bandits began robbing raft trips, ending wilderness tourism in the corridor. One of the most promising tourist activities, with the least potential impact and the most possibility for helping conservation, archaeology, and cultural preservation, ended. Illegal activity of all types took over the corridor.

The Mexican army, which pervaded the Zapatista region, had little effect on river crime, and may have abetted it. In Guatemala, the absence of the expelled CPR communities, which had helped keep the selva safe and secure, now left it open to invasion, illegal logging, smuggling of immigrants, arms, artifacts, and drugs. (Many members of those communities now work as Defensores, but their numbers are few, and they are poorly paid.) The region continued in a state of low-grade terror and occupation for ten years.

== See also ==
- List of longest rivers of Mexico
