= Palizada Municipality =

Municipality in the Mexican state of Campeche

Palizada
- Municipality
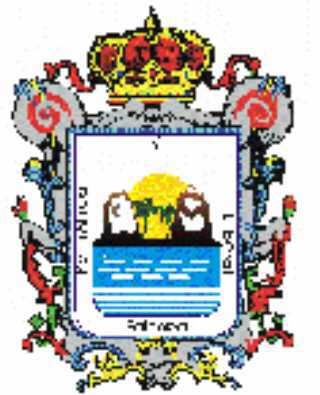
- Coat of arms

- Location of Palizada in Campeche

- Location within Mexico
- Coordinates: 18.25°0′N 92.1°0′W
- Country: Mexico
- State: Campeche
- Municipal seat: Palizada

Government
  - Municipal president: (2006-09)

Area
  - Total: 2,143.28 km^{2} (827.53 sq mi)

Population (2015)
  - Total: 8,971
  - Density: 4.186/km^{2} (10.84/sq mi)
- Time zone: UTC-6 (CST)
- Created: 1 January 1916
- Website: www.palizada.gob.mx/

Palizada (Spanish: [paliˈsaða]) is one of the 13 municipalities that make up the Mexican state of Campeche. It is situated in the far south-west corner of the state. The municipal seat, and largest settlement, is the city of Palizada. As of 2010, the population was 8,352.

== Geography ==
The municipality of Palizada borders to the west with the state of Tabasco and to the east with the neighbouring Campeche municipality of Carmen. It covers a total surface area of 2,071.70 km^{2}.

== Demographics ==
As of 2010, the municipality had a total population of 8,352.

As of 2010, the town of Palizada had a population of 3,089. Other than the town of Palizada, the municipality had 256 localities, none of which had a population over 1,000.
