= Edzná railway station =

Railway station in Campeche, Mexico

Edzná

General information
- Location: Edzná, Campeche, Mexico
- Coordinates: 19.59014°N 90.37061°W
- Platforms: 2
- Tracks: 3

History
- Opened: January 1, 2024

Services
| Preceding station | Tren Maya | Following station |
|---|---|---|
| Carrillo Puerto Champotón toward Palenque | Tren Maya | San Francisco de Campeche toward Cancún Airport |

Edzná is a railway station located near Tixmucuy, Campeche.

== History ==
Andrés Manuel López Obrador announced during his 2018 presidential candidate the Tren Maya project. On 13 August 2018, he announced the complete outline. The route of the new Tren Maya put Edzná on the route that would connect with Escárcega, Campeche and Teya Mérida railway station, Yucatán. Edzná will be the station that connects Campeche and Yucatán with the Edzná Archaeological Zone.

The station will have a maintenance yard for the Tren Maya.
