= Maxcanú railway station =

Railway station in Yucatán, Mexico

Maxcanú

General information
- Location: Maxcanú, Yucatán, Mexico
- Coordinates: 20.60072°N 89.97814°W
- Platforms: 2
- Tracks: 3

Services
Preceding station	Tren Maya	Following station
Calkiní toward Palenque	Tren Maya	Umán toward Cancún Airport

Maxcanú is a train station outside Maxcanú, Yucatán.

== Tren Maya ==
Andrés Manuel López Obrador announced the Tren Maya project in his 2018 presidential campaign. On 13 August 2018, he announced the complete outline. The new Tren Maya put Maxcanú station on the route connecting San Francisco de Campeche railway station and Teya Mérida railway station.

Maxcanú station serves as a station on Section 3 of the Maya Train, in the state of Yucatán.
