= Playa del Carmen railway station =

Railway station in Playa del Carmen, Quintana Roo, Mexico

Playa del Carmen

General information
- Location: Quintana Roo, Mexico
- Coordinates: 20.67832°N 87.11665°W
- Platforms: 5
- Tracks: 9
- Connections: Conexión Intermodal Tren Maya (future)

History
- Opened: 29 February 2024 (ceremonial); 15 March 2024 (passenger service)

Services
Preceding station	Tren Maya	Following station
Tulum toward Palenque	Tren Maya	Puerto Morelos toward Cancún Airport
Location

Playa del Carmen is a railway station in Playa del Carmen, Quintana Roo. The station allows transport and tourism to Playa del Carmen with other parts of the Yucatán Peninsula. On 29 February 2024, the station was officially opened. However, the line it is on did not enter service until two weeks later, so the first passengers to the station arrived on 15 March 2024.

Currently the station does not have public transport routes, but there is the option of taking a taxi from the center of Playa del Carmen that charges about 100 Mexican pesos. There is a planned shuttle bus service, called the Conexión Intermodal Tren Maya, that will connect to the bus terminal and tourist sites of Playa del Carmen.

== History ==
=== Proposals ===
The first proposal of the station was presented in 2021, and it was thought that it will be located on the Cancun-Tulum road, in the corner with 38th Avenue. This location had been chosen by President Andrés Manuel López Obrador, to make it a point to increase the number of passengers who will travel on the train, in addition to being an intermediate point between the commercial area and the housing area of the tourist destination.

The station was thought of three tracks and two platforms, in its design marine forms, which Fonatur called "a wave made into a building" (Spanish: una ola hecha edificio), as it would have undulating forms. The station will be elevated so as not to interfere with the road that would pass under it, and also to enable the construction of a bus station and taxi stand on the ground floor.

Later, the route of Tren Maya Section 5 North (between Cancún Airport and Playa del Carmen) had to be changed, so the location of the station changed. Although the station remained approximately 6 kilometres (3.7 mi) from Playa del Carmen, the original concept of the station had to be completely discarded. The new station would be commissioned to Grupo ICA, which is also building Section 5 South, between Playa del Carmen and Tulum.

=== Opening ===
Elcar David Lozano Águila, CEO of the Tren Maya company, reported on 29 January 2024 that Section 5 North of the Tren Maya, which runs from Cancún to Playa del Carmen, would be opened on 29 February 2024, with a length of 43.3 kilometres (26.9 mi) of electrified double track.

The station was formally inaugurated on 29 February 2024 by the President of Mexico, Andrés Manuel López Obrador, although it was not opened to the public. The inauguration of the station was the site of clashes between the protests by environmental groups and batons of adherents to the project of President Andrés Manuel López Obrador. However, the Tren Maya arrived in Playa del Carmen, where it was received in a medium-sized station after almost two years of work.

The X'Trapolis Tsíimin K'áak arrived at the station at 1:55 pm, after almost two hours of travel from Cancún Airport railway station. Two weeks later, on 15 March, the first passengers were able to get off the station on a train from Cancún.
