= Chetumal Airport railway station =

Railway station in Quintana Roo, Mexico

Chetumal Airport

General information
- Location: Othón P. Blanco, Quintana Roo, Mexico
- Coordinates: 18.50827°N 88.32285°W
- Platforms: 2
- Tracks: 4

History
- Opened: September 29, 2024 (ceremonial); October 6, 2024 (passenger service)

Services
Preceding station	Tren Maya	Following station
Nicolás Bravo-Konhunlich toward Palenque	Tren Maya	Bacalar toward Cancún Airport
Location

Chetumal Airport is a train station near Chetumal, Quintana Roo. The station connects with the Chetumal International Airport.

== Tren Maya ==
Andrés Manuel López Obrador announced the Tren Maya project in his 2018 presidential campaign. On 13 August 2018, he announced the complete outline. The new Tren Maya put Chetumal Airport station on the route connecting Tulum, Quintana Roo and Escárcega, Campeche.

Chetumal Airport station was symbolically "inaugurated" by López Obrador on September 29, 2024, making it the last Tren Maya station to be inaugurated during his presidency. However, it, alongside stations in Bacalar, did not begin passenger service until October 6.
