= Boca del Cerro railway station =

Train station in Tenosique, Tabasco

Boca del Cerro
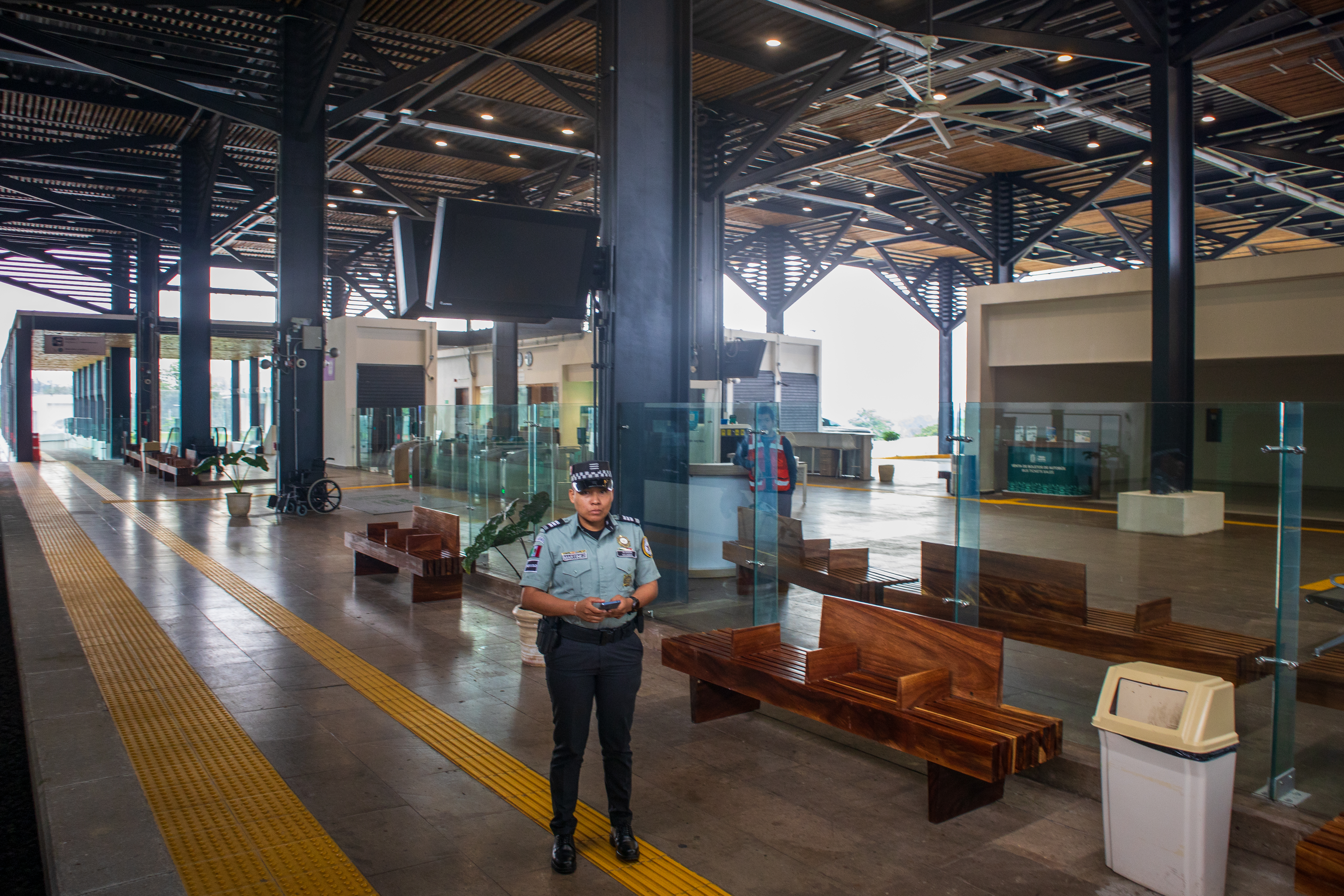
- Platform at the Boca del Cerro station on the Tren Maya

General information
- Location: Tenosique Municipality, Tabasco, Mexico
- Coordinates: 17.4304°N 91.4963°W
- Platforms: 1
- Tracks: 2

Services
Preceding station	Tren Maya	Following station
Palenque Terminus	Tren Maya	Tenosique toward Cancún Airport
Location

Boca del Cerro is a train station located in Tenosique Municipality, in the Mexican state of Tabasco. The station connects Tabasco with Campeche.

== Tren Maya ==
Andrés Manuel López Obrador announced during his 2018 presidential candidate the Tren Maya project. On 13 August 2018, he announced the complete outline. The route of the new Tren Maya put Boca del Cerro on the route that would connect with Palenque railway station and Escárcega railway station.

Boca del Cerro will be the second station on the Tren Maya route and the first in the state of Tabasco. It is located next to the bridge that crosses the Usumacinta River.

== Characteristics of the station ==
The architectural style is a contemporary reinterpretation of the Mayan arch. The design features inverted umbrellas in a pyramidal shape, while the finish is made of brick. This evokes the archaeological zone of Comalcalco. The station has a very open character and great height to give slenderness to the structure and generate air current crossings.

The station will be single level. Service, technical and commercial premises, a pedestrian and vehicular access lobby, and parking will be located throughout the station.
