= Nicolás Bravo-Konhunlich railway station =

Coordinates: 18.4532°N 88.8793°W

Nicolás Bravo-Konhunlich

General information
- Location: Othón P. Blanco, Quintana Roo; Mexico

History
- Opened: December 15, 2024

Services
| Preceding station | Tren Maya | Following station |
|---|---|---|
| Xpujil toward Palenque | Tren Maya | Chetumal Airport toward Cancún Airport |

Nicolás Bravo-Konhunlich is a railway station located near Nicolás Bravo in the municipality of Othón P. Blanco, Quintana Roo, Mexico.

== History ==
Andrés Manuel López Obrador announced the Tren Maya project in his 2018 presidential campaign. On 13 August 2018, he announced the complete route, which included Felipe Carrillo Puerto station on the section in Quintana Roo.

As of July 2024, construction of the station was nearly complete, while the road to the station was being modified to preserve pre-Hispanic structures.

On December 15, 2024, the station was opened, and the final sections of the Tren Maya were completed.
