= Tixkokob railway station =

Railway station in Yucatán, Mexico

Tixkokob
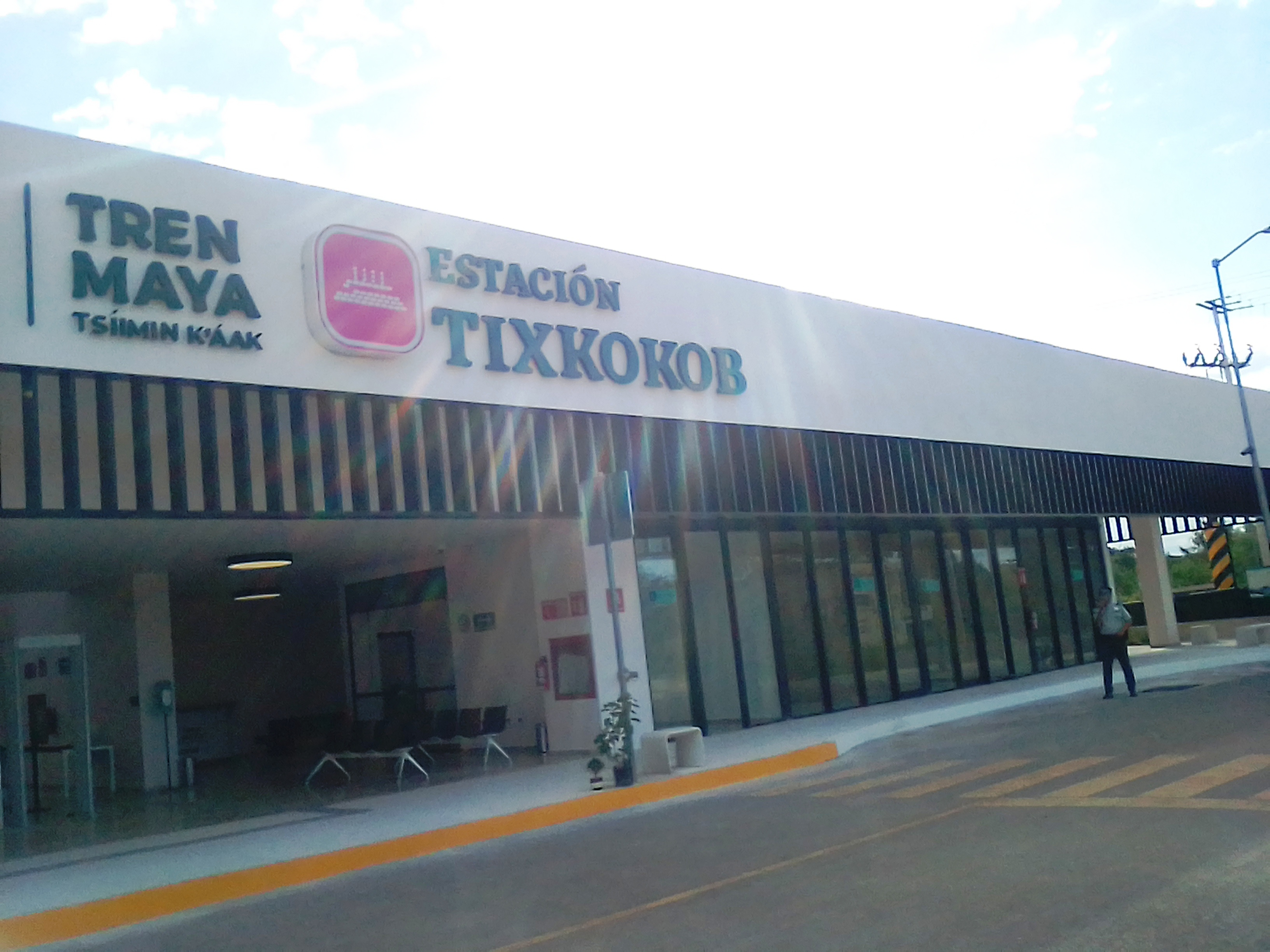

General information
- Location: Tixkokob Municipality, Yucatán, Mexico
- Coordinates: 20.98672°N 89.39530°W
- Platforms: 2
- Tracks: 4

Services
Preceding station	Tren Maya	Following station
Teya Mérida toward Palenque	Tren Maya	Izamal toward Cancún Airport
Location

Tixkokob is a train station in Tixkokob Municipality, Yucatán.

== Tren Maya ==
Andrés Manuel López Obrador announced the Tren Maya project in his 2018 presidential campaign. On 13 August 2018, he announced the complete outline. The new Tren Maya put Tixkokob station on the route connecting Teya Mérida railway station and Cancún Airport railway station.

Tixkokob serves as a station on Section 3 of the Tren Maya, in the state of Yucatán.
