= Carrillo Puerto Champotón railway station =

Carrillo Puerto Champotón

General information
- Location: Carrillo Puerto, Campeche, Mexico
- Coordinates: 19.0927°N 90.5230°W

History
- Opened: 1 January 2024

Services
Preceding station	Tren Maya	Following station
Escárcega toward Palenque	Tren Maya	Edzná toward Cancún Airport
Location

Carrillo Puerto Champotón (Paradero Carrillo Puerto Champotón) is a train station serving the municipality of Champotón in the Mexican state of Campeche.

== History ==
Andrés Manuel López Obrador announced the Tren Maya project during his 2018 presidential campaign. On 13 August 2018, he announced the complete outline. The route of the new Tren Maya put Carrillo Puerto on the route that would connect with Escárcega, Campeche, with Calkiní, Campeche.

It is located within a railway viaduct. The station has 2 tracks and 1 platform, to serve local passengers.

Currently, the Carrillo Puerto Champotón stop is open and receives local, national and international travelers.
