= Bacalar =

Town in Quintana Roo, Mexico

- City and municipality
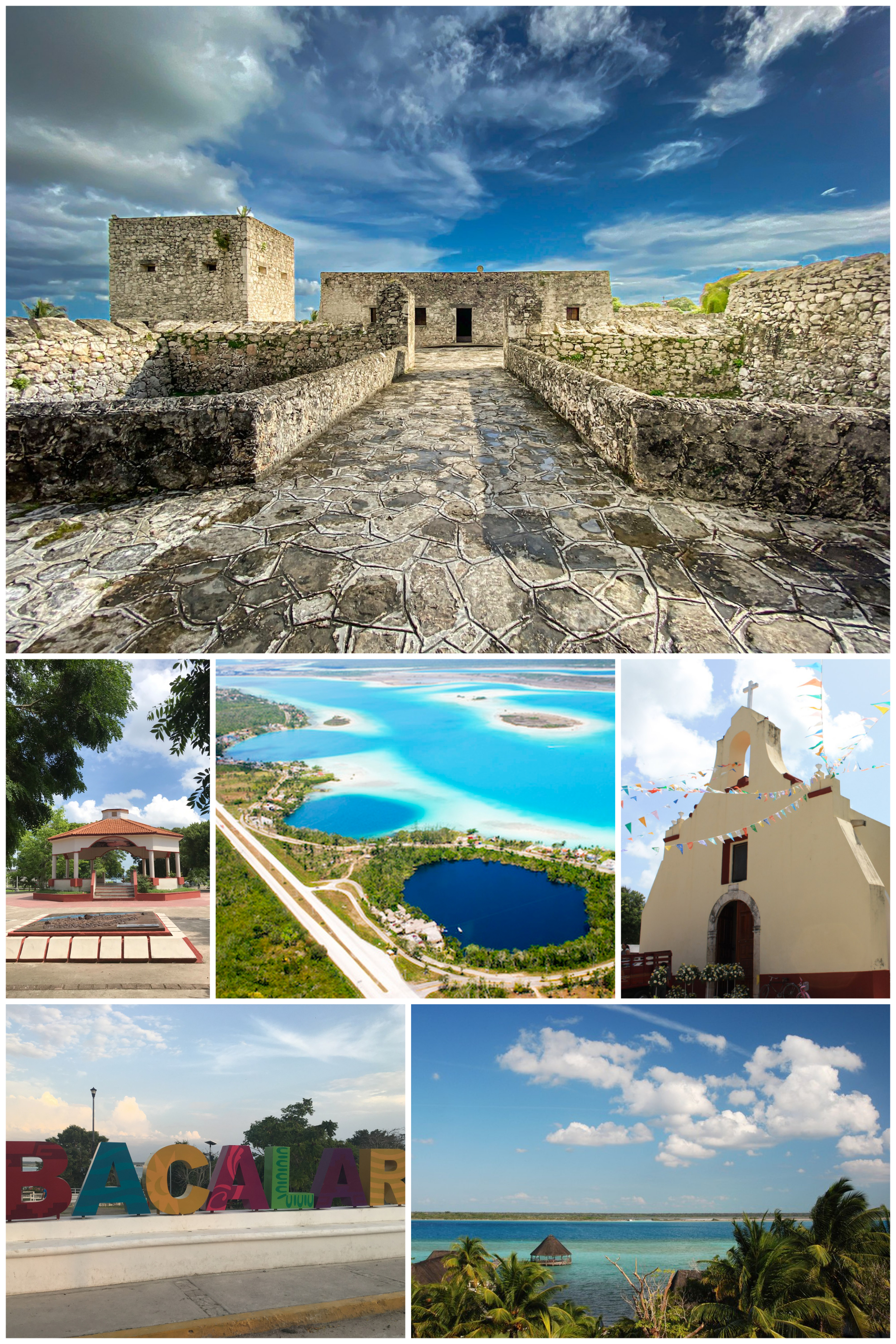
- Left to right: San Felipe de Bacalar Fort · Kiosk · Natural cenote · San Joaquín parish · Monumental letters · View of Laguna de los Siete Colores

- Location within Quintana Roo Location within Mexico
- Coordinates: 18°40′37″N 88°23′43″W
- Country: Mexico
- State: Quintana Roo
- Municipality: Bacalar

Population (2020)
  - Total: 12,572

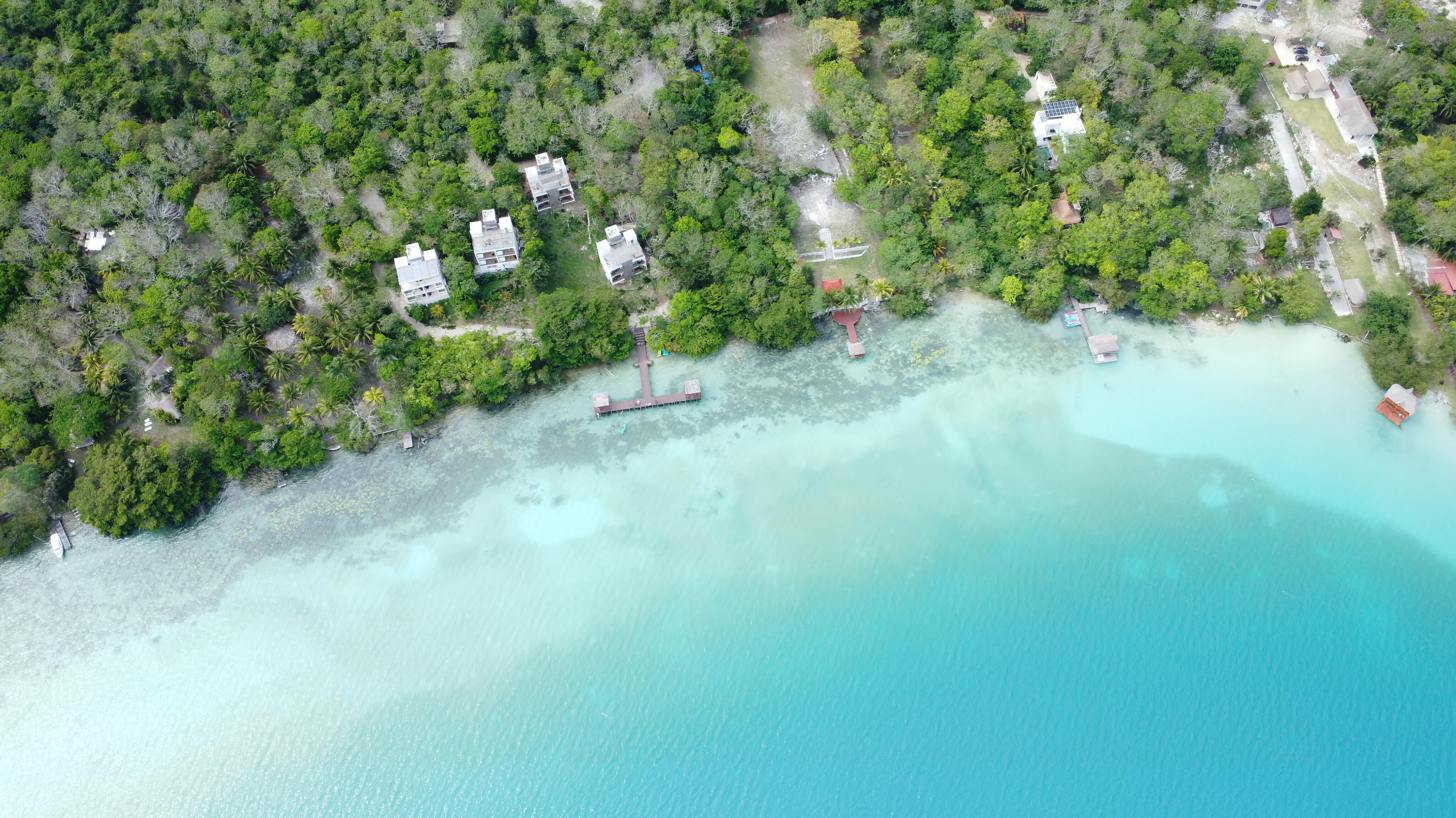
Aerial photograph of "La laguna de los 7 colores", next to vacation homes

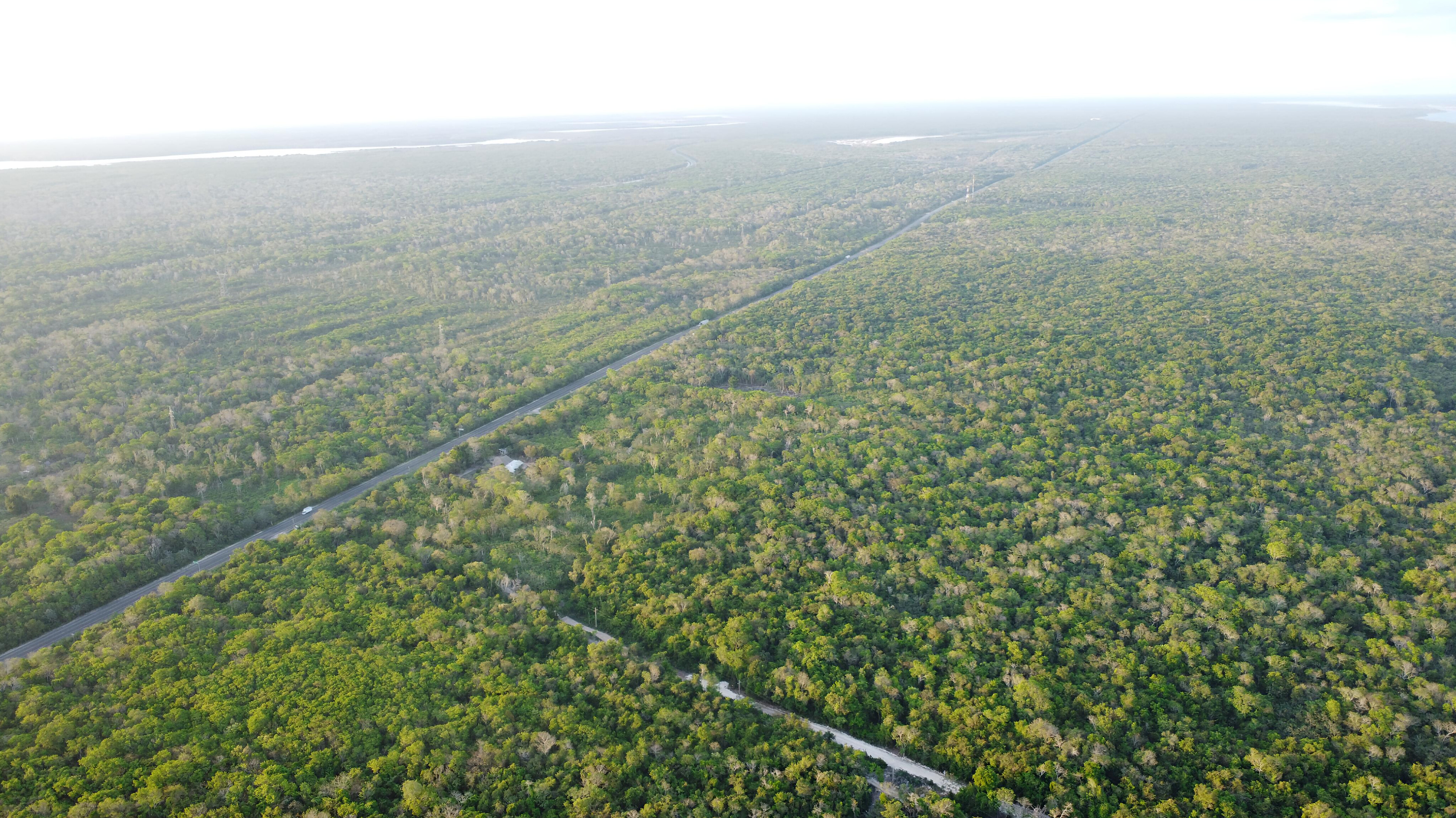
Tropical jungle near Bacalar

Bacalar (Spanish: [bakaˈlaɾ]) is the municipal seat and largest city in Bacalar Municipality (until 2011 a part of Othón P. Blanco Municipality) in the Mexican state of Quintana Roo, about 40 kilometres (25 mi) north of Chetumal. In the 2010 census the city had a population of 11,084. At that time it was still part of Othón P. Blanco, and was its second-largest city (locality), after Chetumal.

== Etymology ==
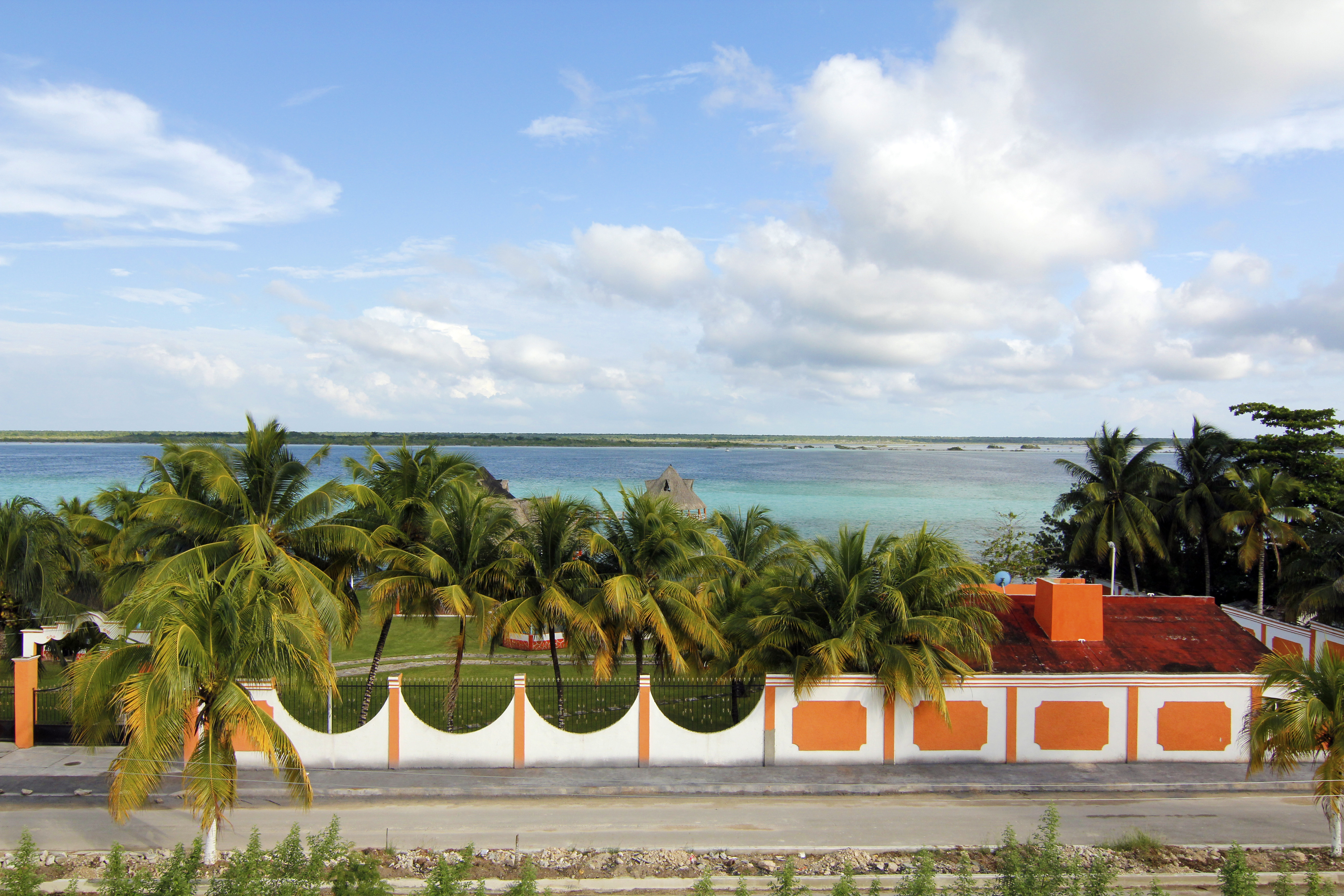
Bacalar Lagoon seen from Bacalar

The name most likely derives from Mayan languages: bʼak halal, (Sian Ka'an Bakhalal) meaning "surrounded by reeds", the name of the locality attested at the time of the 16th century arrival of the Spanish.

Lake Bacalar, a lagoon, is on the east side of the town.

== History ==
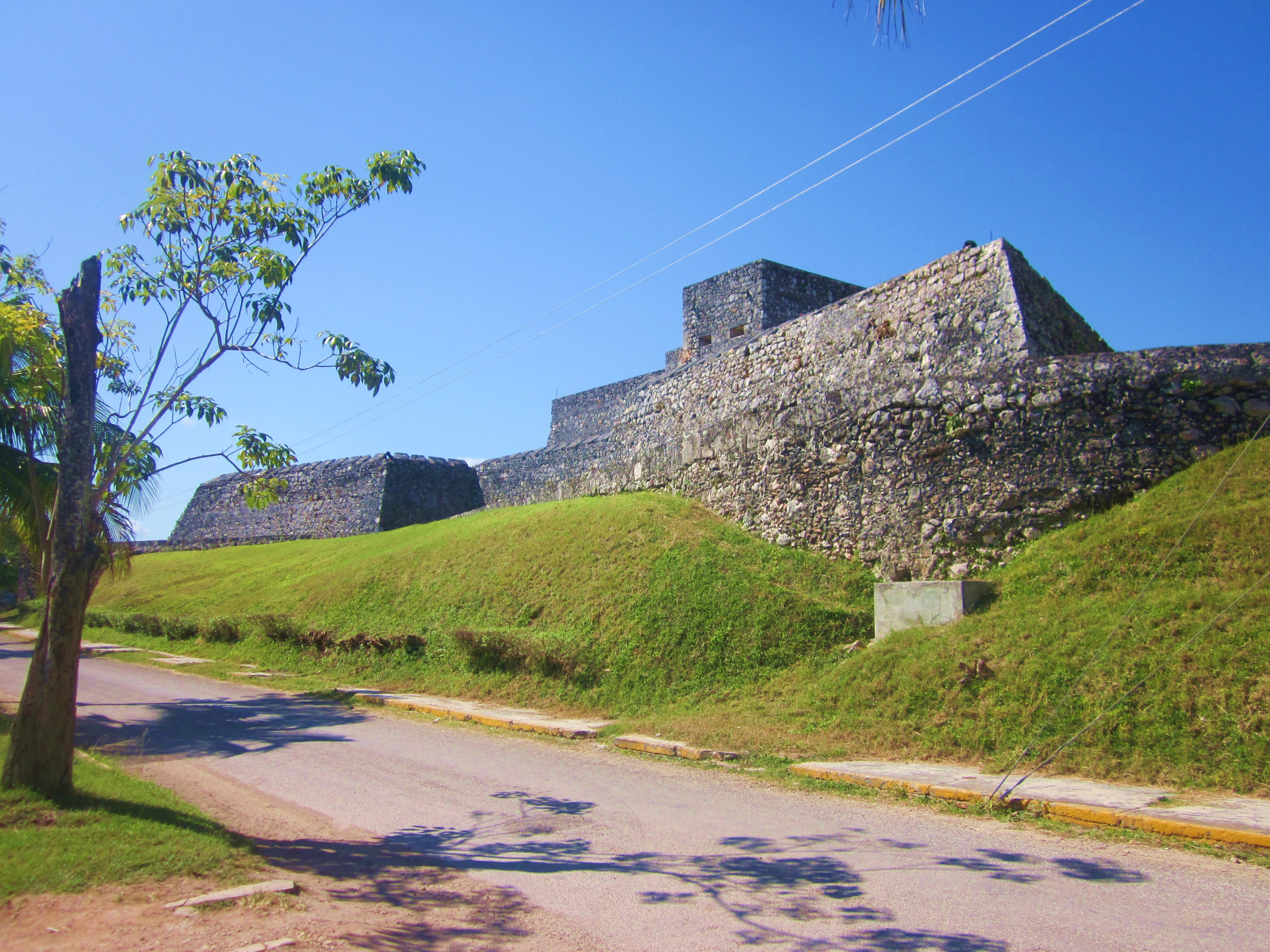
Fortress of San Felipe Bacalar

Bacalar was a city of the Maya civilization in Pre-Columbian times, and was founded in 415 A.D. with the name of "Sian Ka'an Bakhalal". It was the first city in the region that the Spanish Conquistadores succeeded in taking and holding, in 1543 (during the 1543–1544 Pachecos entrada). In 1545 Gaspar Pacheco established the Spanish town here with the name Salamanca de Bacalar with the help of Juan de la Cámara. The southern half of what is now Quintana Roo was governed from Bacalar, answerable to the Captain General of Yucatán in Mérida.

After pirates sacked the town in the 17th century, the Fortress de San Felipe Bacalar was completed in 1729, and may be visited today.

In 1848 Bacalar had a population of about 5,000. In 1848, during the Caste War of Yucatán, rebellious Chan Santa Cruz Maya conquered the town. It was retaken by the Mexicans in 1902.

Bacalar was named a "Pueblo Mágico" in 2006.

Between 2005 and 2010 Russian Mennonites who speak German established a colony in Salamanca that had 967 inhabitants in 2010 and 1.175 in 2020. All inhabitants were Protestants and only one of those aged 15 and over was illiterate.

This is the Cenote Negro (Witch's Cenote) edges of the water

In Bacalar Mexico, there is a place in the lagoon with deep dark waters which is called the Cenote Negro, also known as Witch’s Cenote. It is known like that because of the legend that locals tell, which is they believe to be a witch living there near the cenote in a brick house. She supposedly cursed the whole area in not letting anyone who went there stay alive and if they did they would just be mentally ill. Some of the locals believe in the cenotes legend and say that it has a mysterious reputation and thats why people are afraid of it. Even though the legend is very popular to the locals, the claims about the curse have not been proven.

== Transportation ==
Bacalar is also served by a station of the Tren Maya, which opened on October 6, 2024, alongside the Chetumal Airport railway station.

Additionally, the nearby Limones and Chacchoben archeological sites are served by a separate Tren Maya station, called the Limones-Chacchoben railway station (Estación de Limones-Chacchoben).

Services at Limones-Chacchoben station
Preceding station	Tren Maya	Following station
Bacalar toward Palenque	Tren Maya	Felipe Carrillo Puerto toward Cancún Airport
Services at Bacalar station
Chetumal Airport toward Palenque	Tren Maya	Limones/Chacchoben toward Cancún Airport
