= Felipe Carrillo Puerto railway station =

Train station in Quintana Roo, Mexico

Felipe Carrillo Puerto

General information
- Location: Felipe Carrillo Puerto Municipality, Quintana Roo, Mexico
- Coordinates: 19.5923°N 88.0745°W
- Platforms: 2
- Tracks: 4

History
- Opening: 20 September 2024

Services
Preceding station	Tren Maya	Following station
Limones/Chacchoben toward Palenque	Tren Maya	Tulum Airport toward Cancún Airport
Location

Felipe Carrillo Puerto is a railway station of the Felipe Carrillo Puerto Municipality, Quintana Roo. The station connects and serves local transport and tourism with the area. It has served the Tren Maya since its opening in 2024.

== Tren Maya ==
Andrés Manuel López Obrador announced the Tren Maya project in his 2018 presidential campaign. On 13 August 2018, he announced the complete route, which included Felipe Carrillo Puerto station on the section in Quintana Roo.

As of September 2024 the station is open and receives travelers.
