= Tren Maya =

Inter-city railway in Yucatán peninsula, Mexico

Mayan Train

- The routes of the Tren Maya

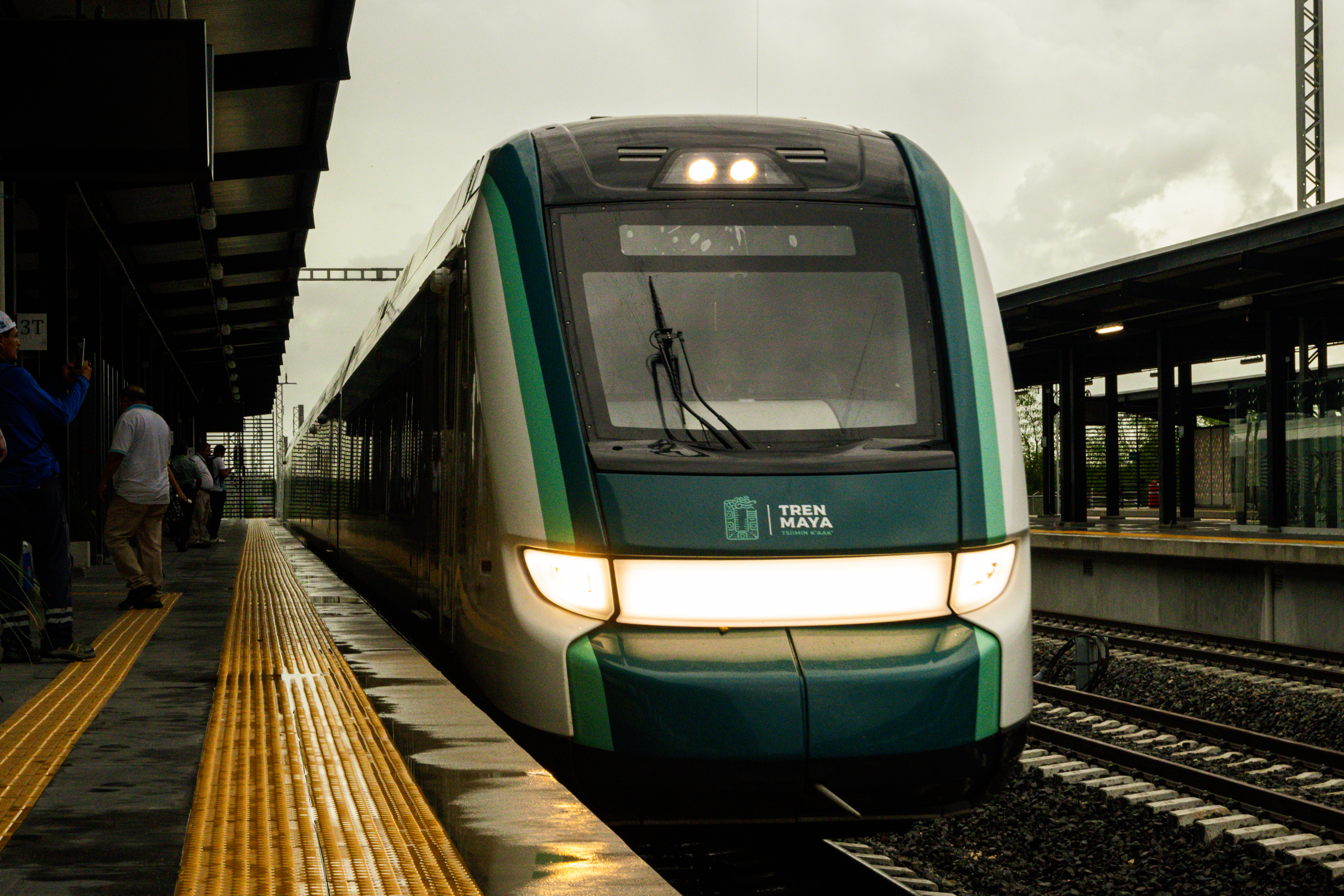
- Tren Maya arriving at Teya Mérida station

Overview
- Native name: Tren Maya (Spanish); Tsíimin K'áak' (Yucatec Maya)
- Owner: Mexican Armed Forces
- Area served: Campeche; Quintana Roo; Yucatán; Tabasco; Chiapas
- Locale: Yucatán Peninsula
- Transit type: Inter-city rail; Freight rail
- Number of lines: 3
- Number of stations: 34 (20 major stations and 14 minor stations)
- Daily ridership: 1,926 passengers (2023–2024)
- Annual ridership: 705,000 passengers (2023–2024)
- Headquarters: Mérida, Yucatán
- Website: trenmaya.gob.mx

Operation
- Began operation: 15 December 2023; 2 years ago
- Rolling stock: 42 X'Trapolis Tsíimin K'áak multiple units

Technical
- System length: 1,554 km (966 mi)
- No. of tracks: 2 (Mérida–Cancún–Chetumal); 1 (Chetumal–Escárcega); 1 (Palenque–Mérida)
- Track gauge: 1,435 mm (4 ft 8 1/2 in) standard gauge
- Average speed: 160 km/h (100 mph)

Tren Maya (Yucatec Maya: Tsíimin K'áak', sometimes also Mayan Train or Maya Train) is a 1,554 km-long (966 mi) inter-city railway in Mexico that traverses the Yucatán Peninsula. Construction began in June 2020 and the Campeche–Cancún section began operation on December 15, 2023, with the rest of the railway opening in subsequent stages, with the final segment from Escárcega to Chetumal beginning operation on December 15, 2024. The railway begins in Cancún International Airport and travels southwest towards Palenque, Chiapas, via two routes that encircle the peninsula.

== Goals ==
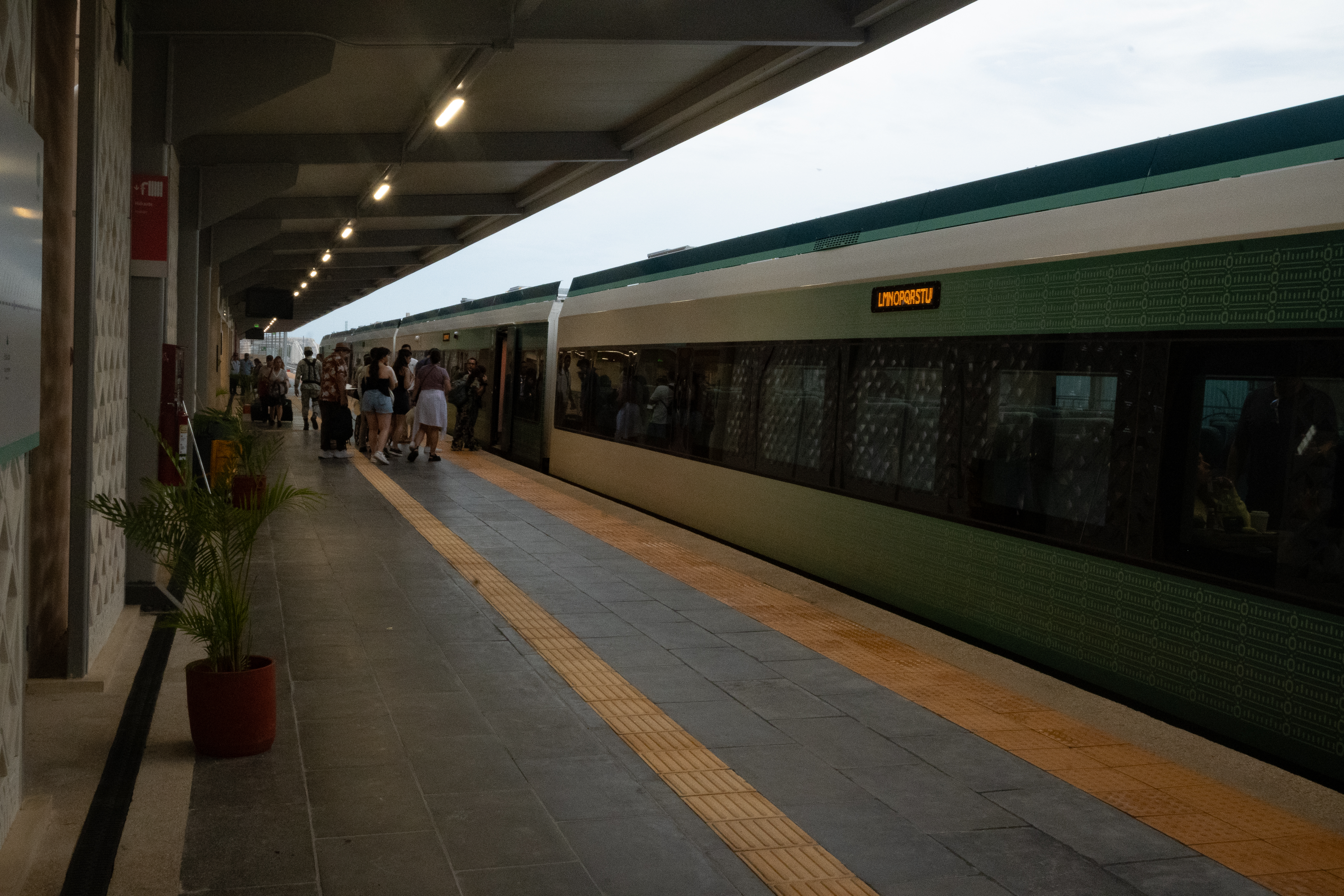
Passengers boarding at Valladolid station

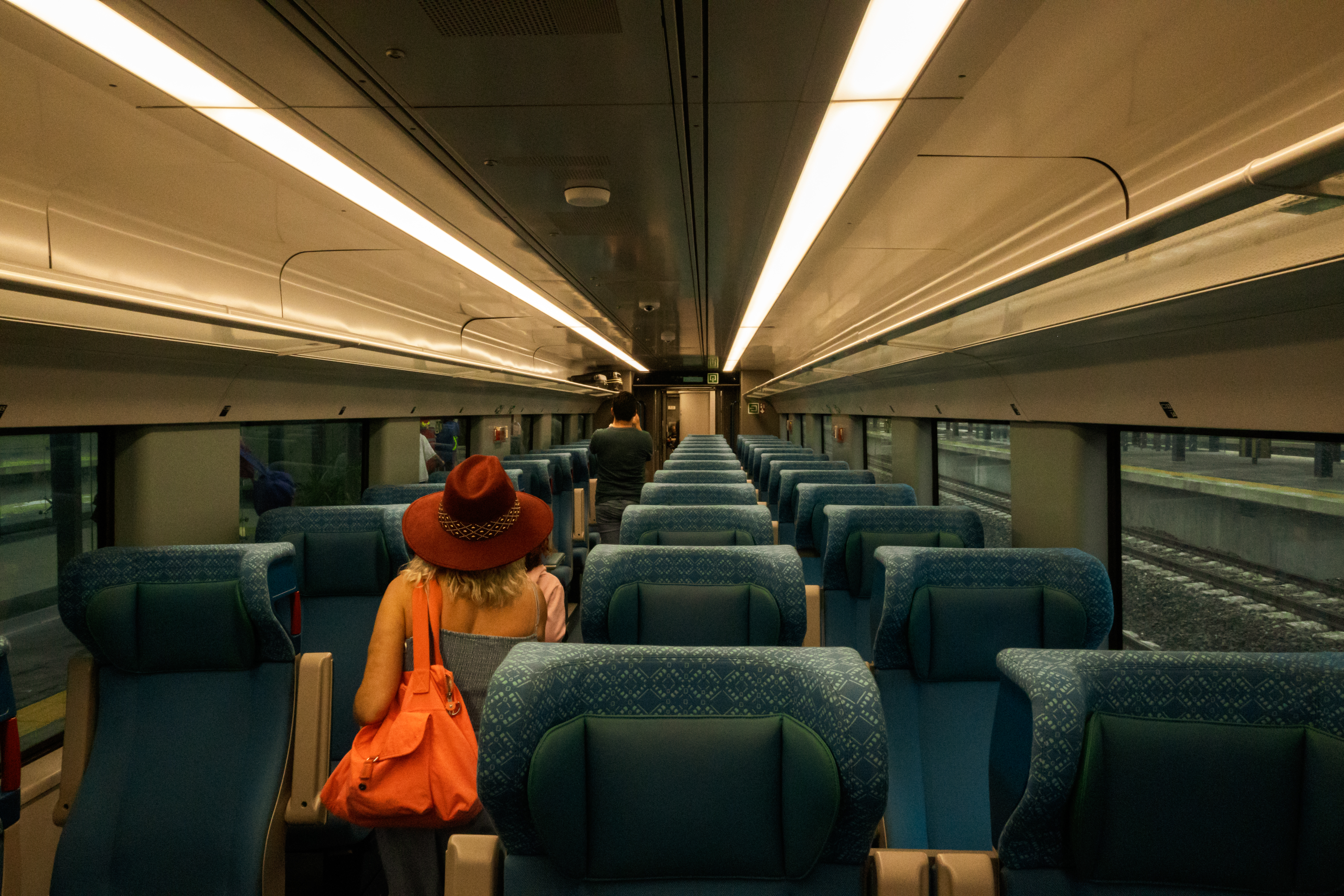
Passengers entering a rail car at Mérida Teya Station

The project aims to connect tourist destinations in the Caribbean with lesser-known sites inland, including historic Maya sites from which it derives its name. By linking the main towns in the region, with 42 trains carrying up to three million passengers a year, the line is intended to redistribute tourist flows that are currently concentrated on the coast, and to encourage the development of a region that has historically been neglected by the state.

== History ==
=== Prior proposals ===
Efforts to reconnect the southeastern states of Mexico through rail infrastructure had been discussed for decades. During his presidential campaign, Enrique Peña Nieto pledged to construct the Transpeninsular Train Mérida-Punta Venado. However, the project was canceled on 30 January 2015 due to budget cuts.

Yucatán Governor Ivonne Ortega Pacheco also proposed a Rapid Train and City-Rail project aimed at connecting Mérida with key tourist destinations within the state.

In 2009, Grupo Aeroportuario del Sureste (ASUR) presented a proposal to operate an electric train connecting Cancún International Airport to Tulum. Similarly, Quintana Roo Governor Roberto Borge proposed a light rail system along the same route.

=== Proposal ===
The Tren Maya project was announced in September 2018 by Mexican president-elect Andrés Manuel López Obrador, following earlier proposals to build a shorter 900-kilometre (560 mi) line. Previous presidential administrations had also proposed their own passenger rail projects, but were unsuccessful in attaining funding. It would use existing right of way from the Ferrosur as well as new tracks constructed through the jungle. The project was derided by political opposition groups as a stunt for López Obrador, who had also cancelled a major airport project in Mexico City favored by his predecessor. The Zapatista Army of National Liberation announced that it would oppose the project.

=== December 2019 consultation ===
On November 15, 2019, President López Obrador declared that a referendum on the Mayan Train would be held on December 15, 2019, in Chiapas, Tabasco, Campeche, Yucatán, and Quintana Roo.

The weekend of December 15–16, 2019, 92.3% of the people who participated in the consultation voted in favor, while 7.4% voted against the proposal. 100,940 people voted, 2.36% of the 3,536,000 registered voters in the 84 municipalities affected.

The Mexican Office of the United Nations High Commissioner for Human Rights criticized the vote. They pointed out that voters were provided with only the positive effects of the project (improved attention to water supplies, health, education, employment, housing, environmental protection, and culture) but were not informed of the negative effects. The Human Rights Commission also criticized the translations of the material used, the short period of time for the election, and low turnout, particularly among indigenous women. They noted that many potential voters did not have the financial resources to travel to the voting locations, and that the majority of voters were municipal employees. The government rejected the criticisms, stating the consultation met international standards.

=== Funding ===
Funding for the project will come primarily from a tourism tax levied in the region, as well as funds diverted from other programs, including the Mexican Grand Prix.

The project, led by the National Fund for Tourism Development (Fonatur), in December 2018 was estimated to cost 150 billion pesos (US$7.4 billion) and attract 8,000 daily riders. An alternative study by a public policy think tank in 2019 estimated the cost of the project would be 480 billion pesos (US$25.3 billion), supported by the 90 percent cost overrun on the Toluca–Mexico City commuter rail project. In October 2021 Fonatur revised the construction estimate to 200 billion pesos.

In October 2020 the estimated total cost of the project, including 30 years of operating and maintenance but not including electrification, was about 321 billion pesos.

The Secretariat of Tourism will receive a 647.1% increase in its budget for 2021 (MXN $38,613.4 million), of which 94% is destined for the Mayan Train.

In December 2020 president López Obrador announced that the armed forces would operate three sections of the route, and that profits would be used to strengthen finances for pensioners and retirees of the armed forces. In March 2021 Fonatur general director Rogelio Jiménez Pons said that the military would own the entire route, not just the three sections, and would receive all of the profits. According to the government, "the use of Sedena [Mexico's Ministry of Defense] guarantees good administration and prevents the risk of privatization", in a country known for corruption.

Pons stated in September 2021 that the cost of a single trip for locals, for the section that goes from Cancún Airport to Playa del Carmen, will be around 50 pesos. Tourists will be expected to pay between 800 and 1000 pesos for the same trip. When explaining the difference in price, he stated that tourists will have additional services available, such as restaurants.

=== Construction ===
On December 16, 2018, president López Obrador conducted a Maya ritual to commemorate the start of construction on the Maya Train project. The railway will also accommodate local passenger traffic and freight shipments in addition to tourist functions. The first phase of the project is anticipated to open in the late 2020s, but tourism officials in the region have proposed accelerating work for a 2023 opening.

The route consists of seven sections. Section I runs 228 km (142 mi) from Palenque to Escárcega; section II 235 km (146 mi) from Escárcega to Calkiní; section III 172 km (107 mi) from Calkiní to Izamal; section IV 257 km (160 mi) from Izamal to Cancún Airport; section V 121 km (75 mi) from Cancún Airport to Tulum; section VI 254 km (158 mi) from Tulum to Bacalar; and section VII 287 km (178 mi) from Bacalar to Escárcega.

Business leaders in Mérida, Yucatán expressed their support on January 31, 2020, for building four kilometers of the railway underground as it passes through the city of Mérida. In this way, the train will not threaten the city's historic center. They are also optimistic that the tourist train, in combination with improvements in energy, airports, and seaports, will make the region economically competitive with the North and the Bajío. Fonatur later announced that the train would initially not stop in Mérida, but near a hacienda 8 km (5.0 mi) away. They said that by 2025 the station will relocate to La Plancha Park in Mérida.

Construction began in June 2020. The construction companies are Mota-Engil México SAPI and China Communications Construction Company LTD for stretch one (Palenque-Escárcega), Operadora CICSA and FCC Construcción for stretch two (Escárcega-Calkiní), Construcciones Urales and GAMI Ingeniería e Instalaciones for stretch three (Calkiní-Izamal), and Grupo ICA for stretch four (Izamal–Cancún). In September 2020 Fonatur rejected a proposal of investment firm BlackRock for the 125 km (78 mi) fifth stretch of the project, including improvements to the Tulum–Cancún highway.

In February 2021 Fonatur awarded a contract to Acciona and Grupo México for 60.3 km (37.5 mi) of electrified double rail tracks for section five between Playa del Carmen and Tulum. 75% of the 121 km (75 mi) section five is elevated and built as viaduct to protect the ground water.

López Obrador has said the project will be completed prior to the end of his term in 2024. A market survey conducted by Fonatur, PricewaterhouseCoopers and other consultants in 2019 found that a majority of 21 construction companies consider this too fast, an unreasonable time to construct so much new rail, and others have expressed fear of a disaster caused by substandard work, such as the May 2021 Mexico City Metro overpass collapse. In January 2022, to speed up construction, the route was changed to no longer enter Playa del Carmen. As of June 2021, 10% of the project had been completed. This had increased to 25% by February 2022, and 67% by June 2023. Operations officially began on December 15, 2023.

Operations on the line were suspended from December 28 to December 31, in preparation for the extension of service to Palenque. Service resumed on January 1, from Cancún Airport to Palenque. In addition, the Chichén Itzá railway station opened in February 2024 and the Valladolid railway station was expected to open further on.

=== Timeline ===
- December 15, 2023: Campeche–Cancún
- January 1, 2024: Palenque–Cancún
- February 29, 2024: Cancún–Playa del Carmen
- September 20, 2024: Playa del Carmen–Felipe Carrillo Puerto
- September 29, 2024: Chetumal
- December 15, 2024: Escárcega–Chetumal

=== Transparency ===
Critics have suggested that the Maya Train megaproject may not have had enough engineering, procurement and commission time for adequate operational testing. Experts also worry that the accelerated construction could be hiding structural problems. So far, the project has been linked to more than 60 workplace deaths, multiple route changes, and allegations of purchasing faulty ballast from corrupt networks.

Moreover, Andrés Manuel López Beltrán and Gonzalo Lopez Beltran are alleged to have been implicated in a network of contractors that has been accused of overpricing faulty materials for the construction of the Tren-Maya project. Journalist Carlos Loret de Mola, writing in the newspaper El Universal, says that verified audios of Amilcar Olan, a friend of all three of AMLO's sons, portray Gonzalo as having played a critical role in directing the contracts to the network. De Mola also asserts that the allegations from the audio tapes have been largely confirmed by various documents obtained through freedom of information requests.

== Progreso extension ==
In June 2022 Interior Secretary Adán Augusto López Hernández announced a planned extension to Progreso and Umán in Yucatán. A planned freight connection to the Port of Progreso has since become impossible because the construction of an elevated roadway has blocked the railroad right-of-way.

== Rolling stock ==
Original plans in 2019 called for electric locomotives on the trains. In June 2020 the government announced a switch to diesel to reduce costs, then in August 2020 they announced that half the route, from Mérida to Chetumal via Cancún, would be electrified.

In May 2021 Fonatur contracted with a consortium headed by the French company Alstom to supply rolling stock and related equipment. The rolling stock of the Tren Maya was designed by Alstom, and its 219 cars were being built in Ciudad Sahagún. Of these trains, 32 of them will be electro-diesel multiple units, 10 will be standard diesel multiple units. The contract also includes European Train Control System signalling and control equipment.

Regular passenger service will be provided by the Xiinbal train, named for a Mayan term meaning "to walk", as the regular passenger service. They will have business class seats, standard seating, and a buffet car. This service will be offered to frequent local passengers, but also to occasional passengers and tourists.

The Janal trains (from a Mayan term meaning "to eat") will add a dining car to the previous services, which will have aquatic landscapes on the outside, and an interior inspired by the work of Luis Barragán. “The restaurant offers two layout options and various seating configurations to allow optimal use of space in a beautiful setting."

The P'atal trains (from a Mayan term meaning "to stay") will have reclining seats and sleeping cabins, designated especially for long-distance journeys.

In addition, several locomotives have been imported to Mexico to help construct the line, including eight ex-China Railway DF-4D locomotives owned by Chinese contractors, some Vossloh G2000 BB locomotives, and "older locomotives imported secondhand from Europe".

Passenger rail stock
Model	Type	Consist							Capacity	Total number of trains
Model	Type	1	2	3	4	5	6	7	Capacity	Total number of trains
X'Trapolis Tsíimin K'áak	Xiinbal (standard)	4 to 7 cars							230 to 430 passengers	31
X'Trapolis Tsíimin K'áak	Janal (restaurant)	4 cars							140 passengers	8
X'Trapolis Tsíimin K'áak	P’atal (long-distance)	7 cars							260 passengers	3

Non-passenger diesel locomotives
Model	Year	Type	Total	Number
China Railway DF-4D	?	Diesel locomotive (for construction work)	8	713-003 to 713-007 known
Vossloh G2000 BB	?	Diesel locomotive (for construction work)	?	1004 known
Other diesel locomotives	?	Diesel locomotive (for construction work)		
GE ES44AC	2025	Diesel locomotive (for freight service)	7	TMY 2001–2007
Retired locomotives
EMD GP38-2		Diesel locomotive (for construction work)	1	LASX (Note: AAR reporting mark for Lascasiana SA de CV, a locomotive leasing company that owns unit 3850.) 3850 (Note: Reportedly ex-NdeM/FCCM/FIT 9224. Spotted in the San Luis Potosí junkyard 2026)

== Conexión Intermodal Tren Maya ==
Conexión Intermodal Tren Maya

Overview
- Area served: Cancun, Puerto Morelos, and Playa del Carmen, Quintana Roo, Mexico
- Transit type: Shuttle bus
- Number of lines: 3

Operation
- Operation will start: TBD
- Operator: Tren Maya
- Rolling stock: BYD Auto electric buses

Technical
- Top speed: 69 km/h (43 mph)

The Conexión Intermodal Tren Maya is a future set of 3 electric shuttle bus connections in Cancun, Puerto Morelos, and Playa del Carmen that will link to the Tren Maya. Two lines will connect Puerto Morelos and Playa del Carmen stations with different tourist attractions of the region, while a third will connect the Cancún Airport railway station with the 4 terminals of Cancun International Airport.

Work on the Cancun Airport shuttle began in July 2023, and it was hoped that it would begin operations on February 29, 2024.

The Cancun shuttle bus will use 7 electric buses, which have a top speed of 69 kilometres per hour (43 mph). Although it was originally announced that they will have a capacity of 47 passengers (32 seated and 15 standing), they only have 18 seats. These 7 buses, built by BYD Auto, arrived at the airport in March 2024.

== Route and stations ==
Name	Icon	Opened	Municipality and State	Type	Connections
Palenque		December 31, 2023	Palenque, Chiapas	Major	Line FA at Pakal Ná (Palenque) Tren Interoceánico station; Palenque International Airport
Boca del Cerro		December 31, 2023	Tenosique, Tabasco	Major	
Tenosique		December 31, 2023	Tenosique, Tabasco	Minor	
El Triunfo		December 31, 2023	Balancán, Tabasco	Major	
Candelaria		December 31, 2023	Candelaria, Campeche	Minor	
Escárcega		December 31, 2023	Escárcega, Campeche	Major	
Carrillo Puerto Champotón		December 31, 2023	Champotón, Campeche	Minor	
Edzná		December 31, 2023	Campeche, Campeche	Major	
San Francisco de Campeche		December 15, 2023	Campeche, Campeche	Major	Campeche International Airport; Campeche Light Train
Tenabo		December 15, 2023	Tenabo, Campeche	Minor	
Hecelchakán		December 15, 2023	Hecelchakán, Campeche	Minor	
Calkiní		December 15, 2023	Calkiní, Campeche	Minor	
Maxcanú		December 15, 2023	Maxcanú, Yucatán	Minor	
Umán		December 15, 2023	Umán, Yucatán	Major	Ie-Tram Yucatán
Teya Mérida		December 15, 2023	Kanasín, Yucatán	Major	Mérida International Airport; Ie-Tram Yucatán
Tixkokob		December 15, 2023	Tixkokob, Yucatán	Minor	
Izamal		December 15, 2023	Izamal, Yucatán	Major	
Chichén Itzá		December 15, 2023	Tinúm, Yucatán	Minor	Chichen Itza International Airport
Valladolid		December 15, 2023	Valladolid, Yucatán	Major	
Nuevo Xcán		December 15, 2023	Lázaro Cárdenas, Quintana Roo	Major	
Leona Vicario		December 15, 2023	Puerto Morelos, Quintana Roo	Major	
Cancún Airport		December 15, 2023	Benito Juárez, Quintana Roo	Major	Cancún International Airport
Puerto Morelos		February 29, 2024	Puerto Morelos, Quintana Roo	Major	
Playa del Carmen		February 29, 2024	Solidaridad, Quintana Roo	Major	
Tulum		September 20, 2024	Tulum, Quintana Roo	Major	
Tulum Airport		September 20, 2024	Felipe Carrillo Puerto, Quintana Roo	Major	Tulum International Airport
Felipe Carrillo Puerto		September 20, 2024	Felipe Carrillo Puerto, Quintana Roo	Major	
Limones-Chacchoben		December 15, 2024	Bacalar, Quintana Roo	Minor	
Bacalar		December 15, 2024	Bacalar, Quintana Roo	Major	
Chetumal Airport		September 29, 2024 (Partial) December 15, 2024	Othón P. Blanco, Quintana Roo	Major	Chetumal International Airport
Nicolás Bravo-Konhunlich		December 15, 2024	Othón P. Blanco, Quintana Roo	Minor	
Xpujil		December 15, 2024	Calakmul, Campeche	Major	
Calakmul		December 15, 2024	Calakmul, Campeche	Minor	
Centenario		December 15, 2024	Escárcega, Campeche	Minor	

== Opposition ==
Environmental and indigenous rights activists objected to construction of new tracks through the jungle.

On the 26th anniversary of its armed uprising, January 1, 2020, the Zapatista Army of National Liberation expressed its opposition to the project and declared that the consultation provided only positive information to voters prior to voting.

Groups close to the National Indigenous Congress (CNI) plan to seek injunctions against the train project and other construction in the region. The CNI is looking at three-pronged action: social awareness campaigns, media campaigns, and legal actions. On January 28, 2020, a judge in Campeche issued a temporary injunction against construction of the railway because it was approved in a "simulated consultation." In a visit to the city of Campeche, President López Obrador defended the train and pointed out that not only had the train received its greatest support in the state of Campeche, but also that more than half the route would run through the state—worth MXN $60 billion of the $130 billion the government plans to invest in total. He said the section from Escárcega to Cancún should be open for tourist, passenger, and freight traffic in 2023, but that the route will not pass through the Calakmul Biosphere Reserve.

In November 2020 the Regional Indigenous Council of Xpujil delivered a petition with 268,000 signatures to the Campeche Ministry of Environment and Natural Resources asking that the project be suspended because of environmental concerns. Residents of Chocholá, Mérida, and Izamal, in Yucatán obtained a temporary delay in construction in January 2021 until Fonatur and SEMARNAT report on an environmental impact assessment.

On March 3, 2021, an injunction was filed by 80 people from Campeche who fear eviction from their homes. The First District Court in Campeche granted them the provisional suspension. Yucatán's fourth district court also ordered a stop to construction. The brought the total number of injunctions filed in the Yucatán Peninsula to 16 in March 2021, increasing to at least 25 by January 2022. Most of the injunctions have been filed by indigenous collectives who consider the project to be an environmental disaster. Court rulings are not binding on Tren Maya because it has been declared a national security project. The injunctions have had little effect, and construction continues. López Obrador has criticized the saliency in opposition to the train as a partisan attempt to halt his administration's infrastructure projects.

A group of celebrities, including comedian Eugenio Derbez, singers Rubén Albarrán and Natalia Lafourcade, and actress Kate del Castillo, as part of the Sélvame del Tren ("Save me from the Train", a play on words between Sálvame meaning Save Me, and Selva meaning jungle) campaign, has expressed opposition to the train.

In July 2022 residents of Chemax barricaded surrounding roads, bringing construction to a halt. They say the government has violated its agreement by clearing the jungle and failing to provide promised infrastructure.

However, according to Etienne von Bertrab, a specialist in political ecology at University College London (UCL) and co-founder of an interdisciplinary study group on the implications of the Maya Train, opposition to the project "is above all a media campaign, driven by a few collectives, but it is by no means a social movement. They have no popular support." The vast majority of the population of the states concerned seem to support the Mayan Train.

=== Environmental concerns ===
As of January 2021, workers and archeologists had uncovered more than 8,000 ancient artifacts and structures during construction.

The National Alliance for Conservation of the Jaguar has identified twelve wildlife corridors that could be constructed to mitigate the situation for the jaguars that live in the area.

The Centro Mexicano de Derecho Ambiental environmental group has accused Fonatur of deforestation along the route, not accounted for in the environmental impact assessment and without acquiring the necessary permits. In November 2021 the Interior Department exempted Tren Maya and other infrastructure projects from environmental review.

In March 2022, Greenpeace organizers tied themselves to heavy machinery as a protest against construction in Quintana Roo that involves cutting down the jungle without environmental studies having been made.

Cave diver Jose Urbina Bravo conducts expeditions to study the train's impact on wildlife and the environment above ground and in caves. Urbina Bravo is also involved in a legal battle to halt construction.

Segment number 5 of the Maya Train network has been the most contested by environmental associations. Stretching over 110 kilometers, its completion involved the deforestation of a continuous 60-meter-wide strip – that's 2.2 million trees "felled or displaced", according to the authorities. The route of the track was modified several times to take into account the demands of environmentalists. Before starting work, the Ministry of the Environment carried out an inventory of flora and fauna, and relocated animals to protected areas.

The Mexican Center for Environmental Law (Cemda), however, denounces a project which, in its entirety, has destroyed "2,500 hectares of tropical rainforest" and directly affected twenty protected natural areas.

=== Social issues ===
Residents of 130 localities directly affected by the railroad route will benefit from "388 worksites and social actions", including the rehabilitation of pavements and roads, public spaces, electrical, sanitary and productive infrastructures, and housing.

== Incidents ==
On 25 March 2024, a train derailed near Tixkokob railway station when en route toward Cancún Airport railway station. No injuries were reported. On 19 August 2025, a train derailed at the platforms of Izamal railway station.

== See also ==
- Rail transport in Mexico
- Ferrocarriles Chiapas-Mayab
- Tren Interoceánico
