= Tulum railway station =

Proposed railway station in Tulum, Mexico

Tulum

General information
- Location: Tulum Municipality, Quintana Roo, Mexico
- Coordinates: 20.24680°N 87.45339°W
- Platforms: 2
- Tracks: 4

History
- Opening: 20 September 2024

Services
Preceding station	Tren Maya	Following station
Tulum Airport toward Palenque	Tren Maya	Playa del Carmen toward Cancún Airport
Location

Tulum is a train station near Tulum, Quintana Roo, on the Tren Maya system.

== Tren Maya ==
Andrés Manuel López Obrador announced the Tren Maya project in his 2018 presidential campaign. The system's Tulum station was placed on the eastern route connecting Cancún International Airport and Escárcega, Campeche.

This station is the first of two Tren Maya stations in the Tulum Municipality, along with a station at the Tulum International Airport 27 km (17 mi) southwest of the urban area of Tulum.
