= Izamal railway station =

Train station in Izamal, Yucatán, Mexico

Izamal
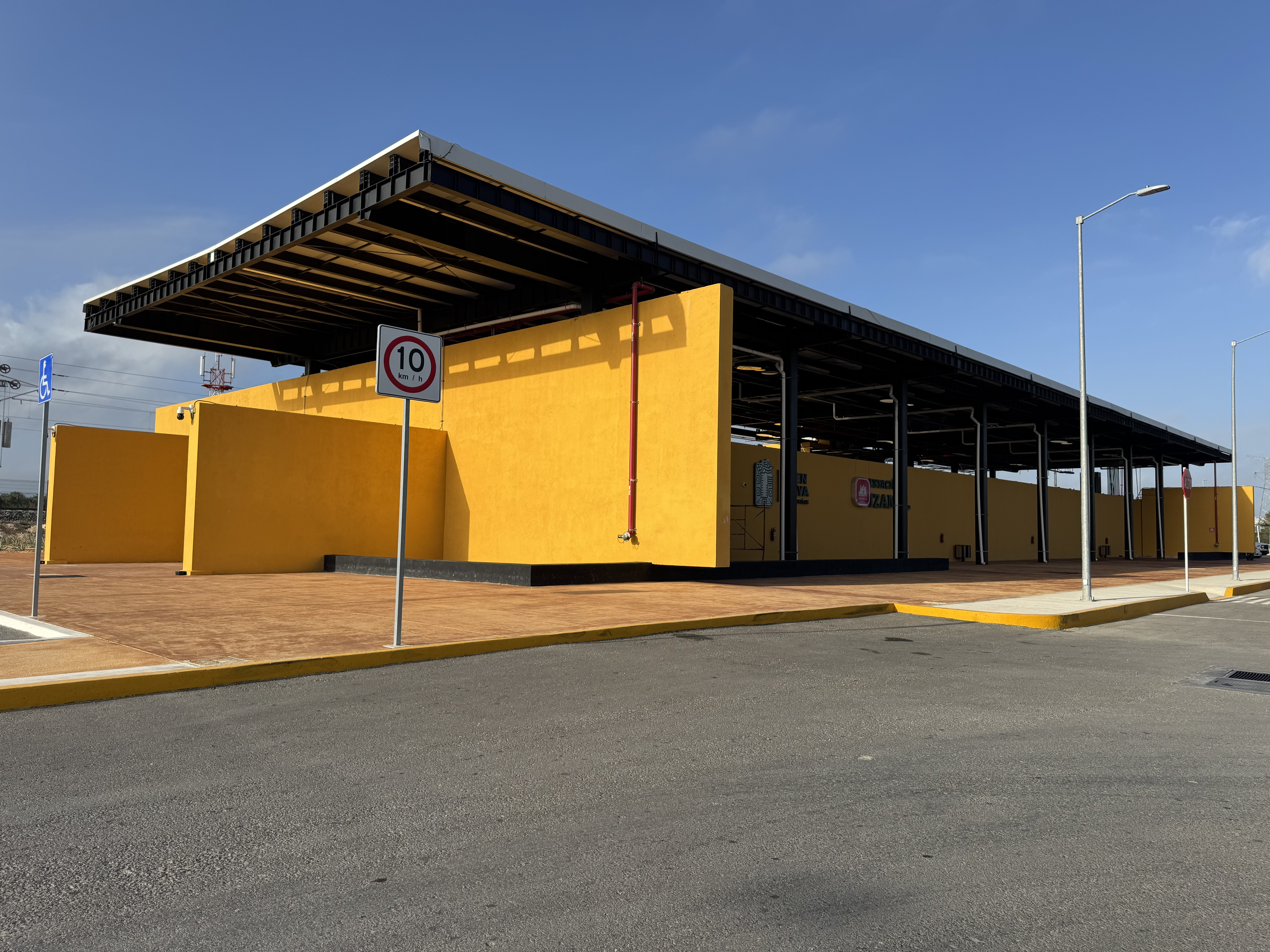

General information
- Location: Izamal, Yucatán, Mexico
- Coordinates: 20.93638°N 89.08502°W
- Platforms: 2
- Tracks: 4

Services
Preceding station	Tren Maya	Following station
Tixkokob toward Palenque	Tren Maya	Chichén Itzá toward Cancún Airport
Location

Izamal is a train station 7 km west of Izamal, Yucatán. Section 3 of the Tren Maya ends here. This station helps to connect the main Yucatecan cities with the rest of the peninsula.

== History ==
The original train station was built in 1883 and located in the city. Ferrocarriles Unidos de Yucatán operated passenger service to Mérida from this station. As of early 2022 the building was being used as storage for the police department.

== Tren Maya ==
Andrés Manuel López Obrador announced the Tren Maya project in his 2018 presidential campaign. On 13 August 2018, he announced the complete outline. The new Tren Maya put Izamal station on the route connecting San Francisco de Campeche railway station and Teya Mérida railway station.

The town is a tourist attraction, promoted by the Mexican government as a pueblo mágico. The station is located south-west of the city and is part of a tourist and service neighborhood. Passenger demand for this station is expected to be low, and it mainly services tourists. Hence, it consists of 3 tracks and 2 platforms.

=== Characteristics ===
The structure of the station is inspired by one of the pyramids of Izamal, with a gable roof structure and vernacular architecture. It has large walls with a slight inclination, with the main corners rounded and the sections of different sizes. All relevant elements of Mayan architecture.

=== Incidents ===
On 19 August 2025, Train 304's third railcar derailed at the station en route towards Teya Mérida railway station. The train was traveling slowly when one of the third railcar's bogie suddenly left the rails. The government of Mexico did not report injuries.
