= Tulum International Airport =

Airport serving Tulum, Quintana Roo, Mexico

Felipe Carrillo Puerto International Airport Aeropuerto Internacional Felipe Carrillo Puerto
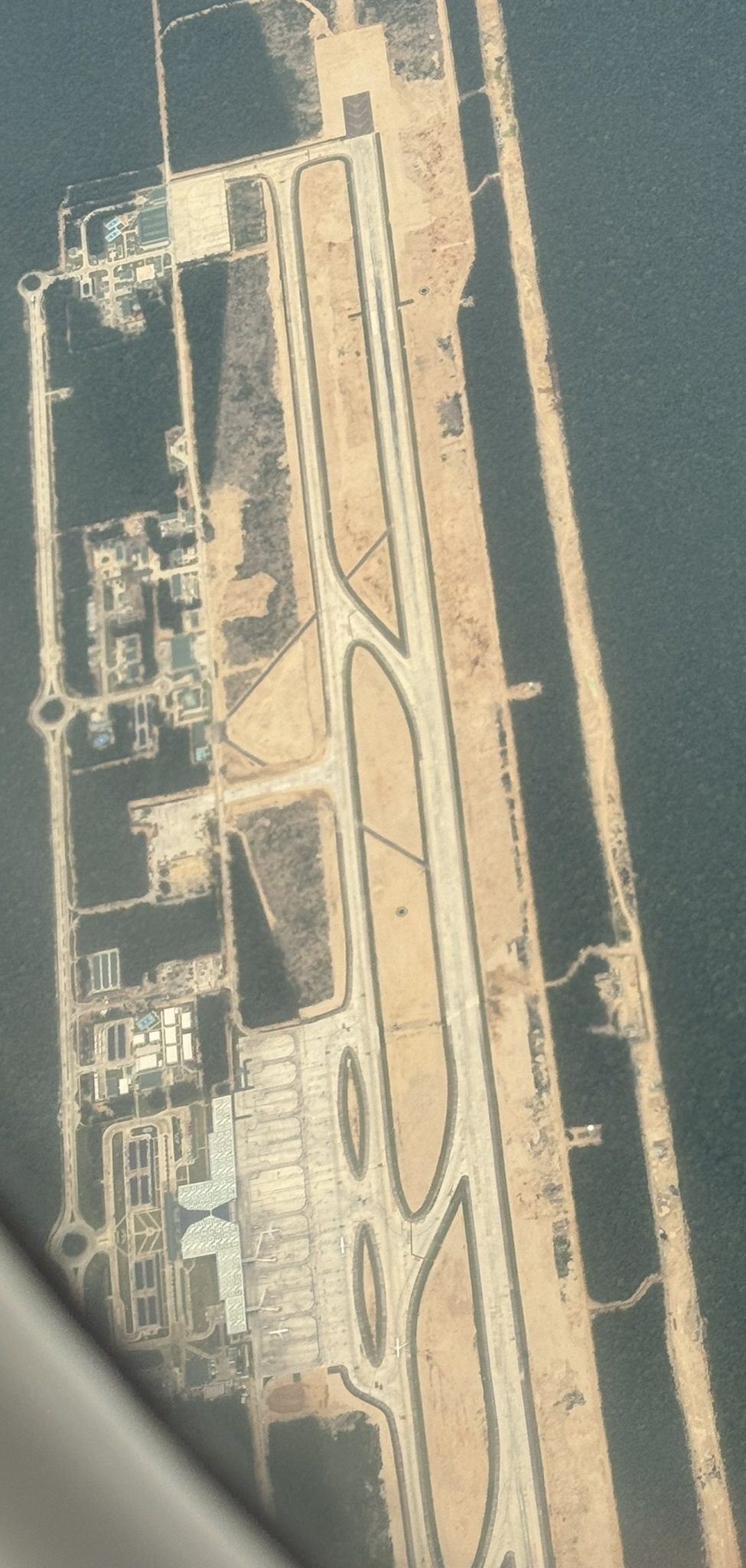
- IATA: TQO; ICAO: MMTL

Summary
- Airport type: Public
- Operator: Grupo Olmeca-Maya-Mexica
- Serves: Tulum
- Location: Felipe Carrillo Puerto, Quintana Roo, Mexico
- Opened: 1 December 2023; 2 years ago
- Time zone: EST (UTC-05:00)
- Elevation AMSL: 20 m (66 ft)
- Coordinates: 20°10′20″N 087°39′38″W
- Website: aitulum.com/en

Map
- Location of airport in Quintana Roo TQO/MMTL (Mexico)

Runways
Direction	Length		Surface
Direction	m	ft	Surface
12/30	3,700	12,139	Concrete

Statistics (2025)
- Passengers: 1,248,645
- Ranking in Mexico: 26th ▼3
- Source: Agencia Federal de Aviación Civil

Tulum International Airport (Spanish: Aeropuerto Internacional de Tulum), officially Aeropuerto Internacional Felipe Carrillo Puerto (Felipe Carrillo Puerto International Airport) (IATA: TQO, ICAO: MMTL), is an international airport situated approximately 20 kilometres (12 mi) southwest of Tulum, Quintana Roo, Mexico. It serves both domestic and international air traffic for Tulum, functioning as a secondary gateway for tourists visiting the Mexican Caribbean, the Riviera Maya, and the Yucatán Peninsula. It also supports various executive and general aviation and military activities. The primary airport in the region is Cancún International Airport, situated approximately 125 kilometres (78 mi) north of Tulum.

After commencing construction in 2022, the airport began commercial services on December 1, 2023 operated by Grupo Olmeca-Maya-Mexica, a holding company owned by the Mexican military. It handled 39,768 passengers in its first month of operations, rising to 1,248,645 by 2025.

== History ==
Tulum, a well-known tourist destination, has traditionally relied on Cancún International Airport as its primary gateway. Efforts have been ongoing to reduce Cancun's dominance and establish alternative entry points to this tourist zone, with Cozumel Int'l. Airport emerging as a successful secondary option. In the 2000s, Chichen Itza International Airport was constructed to facilitate access to the central Yucatan region, but financial viability concerns led to its closure shortly after its establishment.

The concept of a Tulum civil airport has been on the horizon for years. It reached a stage of development where, by 2011, bidding for construction contracts was set to conclude. However, the project encountered challenges, leading to a standstill. Following Andrés Manuel López Obrador's inauguration as Mexican president in 2018, political backing for the Tulum Airport further diminished due to an increased emphasis on the Tren Maya project. However, the project regained momentum in 2022 when it was announced by the López Obrador administration as part of efforts to boost tourism, particularly in conjunction with the Tren Maya.

Tulum Airport, constructed and operated by the Mexican army, is part of the broader strategy of the López Obrador administration to engage the armed forces in significant infrastructure projects. This trend of militarization extends to other projects, including the takeover of multiple airports, the Tren Maya, and the revival of Mexicana de Aviación. However, the military's involvement in civilian functions, such as airport management and hotel operations, raises concerns about accountability and transparency.

Construction commenced in 2022, initially scheduled to open in April 2024. Following the announcement, major Mexican and U.S. carriers revealed services from their hubs. In August 2023, Aeroméxico announced services to Mexico City, and Viva announced flights to various Mexican cities. In October 2023, Delta Air Lines disclosed nonstop flights from Atlanta from March 2024. Subsequently, Spirit Airlines revealed plans to add flights from Orlando and Fort Lauderdale. In November 2023, American Airlines announced flights to Charlotte, Miami, and Dallas/Fort Worth, followed by United Airlines unveiling services to Houston, Chicago, Newark, Los Angeles and Denver. The airport began operations on December 1, 2023.

== Facilities ==
Spanning 1,200 hectares (3,000 acres) at an elevation of 20 metres (66 ft) above mean sea level, the airport features a passenger terminal and a 3,700 metres (12,100 ft) runway capable of accommodating wide-body aircraft and handling 5.5 million passengers annually. The apron comprises 13 aircraft stands primarily used by narrow-body aircraft, complemented by hardstands serving general aviation.

The 70,000 square metres (750,000 sq ft) passenger terminal provides standard international airport services in a two-story building separating departure facilities on the top floor and arrivals on the ground floor. It features check-in areas, a security checkpoint, arrivals facilities with baggage claim areas, taxi stands, and car rental services. The departures concourse houses commercial spaces and 13 gates with ramps down to the apron level, allowing passengers to board their planes by walking to the aircraft.

In addition, the airport hosts an Executive Aviation Terminal, equipped with airport lounges and dedicated facilities for general aviation. Future plans involve the construction of an air force base within the airport grounds. Tulum Airport railway station is located next to the airport, with service to Tulum railway station, Cancún International Airport, Chetumal Airport, and other prominent tourist destinations in southeastern Mexico.

== Airlines and destinations ==
=== Passenger ===
Airlines	Destinations
Air Canada	Seasonal: Montréal–Trudeau, Toronto–Pearson
Air Transat	Seasonal: Montréal–Trudeau, Quebec City
American Airlines	Dallas/Fort Worth, Miami
Delta Air Lines	Atlanta
Mexicana de Aviación	Mexico City–Felipe Ángeles
United Airlines	Houston–Intercontinental (ends January 4, 2027); Seasonal: Newark (ends January 2, 2027)
Viva	Mexico City–Felipe Ángeles, Monterrey
Volaris	Guadalajara (ends January 7, 2027)
WestJet	Seasonal: Calgary, Montréal–Trudeau, Toronto–Pearson

=== Destination maps ===
Domestic destinations from Tulum International Airport
Red = Year-round destination
Blue = Future destination
Green = Seasonal destination
North, Central and South American destinations from Tulum International Airport
Red = Year-round destination
Blue = Future destination
Green = Seasonal destination

== Statistics ==
=== Busiest routes ===
Busiest domestic routes from TQO (Jan–Dec 2025)
Rank	City	Passengers
1	Mexico City–AIFA, State of Mexico	171,702
2	Guadalajara, Jalisco	63,463
3	Monterrey, Nuevo León	44,564
4	Mexico City, Mexico City	7,031
5	Tijuana, Baja California	533

Busiest international routes from TQO (Jan–Dec 2025)
Rank	City	Passengers
1	Houston–Intercontinental, United States	54,607
2	Atlanta, United States	54,314
3	Dallas/Fort Worth, United States	46,869
4	Miami, United States	32,993
5	Montréal–Trudeau, Canada	30,328

== See also ==
- List of the busiest airports in Mexico
- List of airports in Mexico
- List of airports by ICAO code: M
- List of busiest airports in North America
- List of the busiest airports in Latin America
- Transportation in Mexico
- Tourism in Mexico
- List of beaches in Mexico
- Riviera Maya
- Mexican Air Force
