= Chetumal International Airport =

International airport in Quintana Roo, Mexico

Chetumal International Airport Aeropuerto Internacional de Chetumal
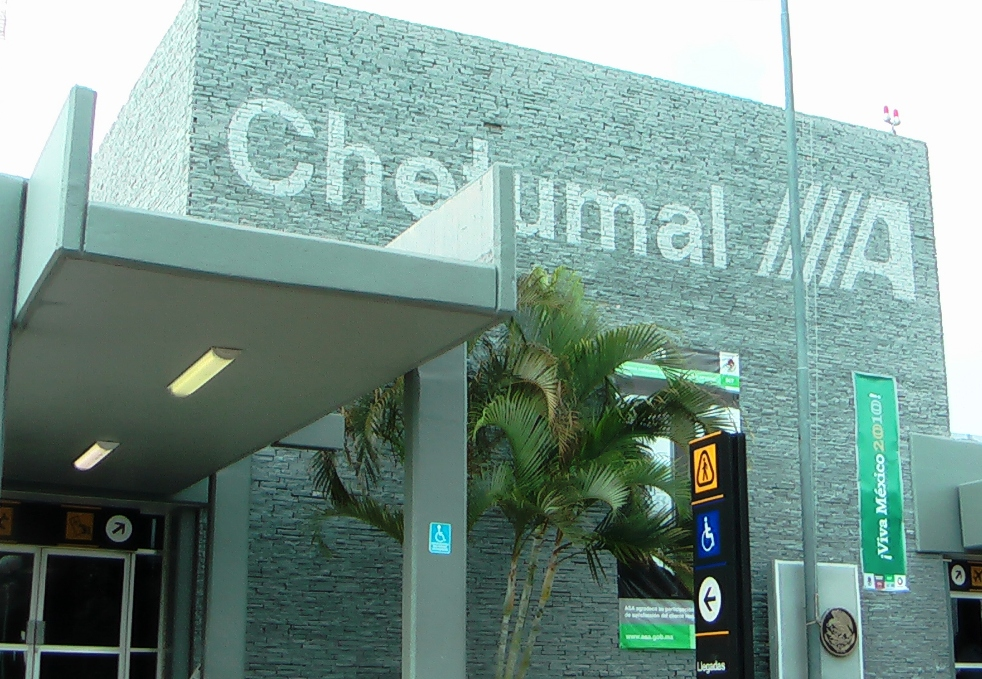
- IATA: CTM; ICAO: MMCM

Summary
- Airport type: Public
- Operator: Grupo Olmeca-Maya-Mexica
- Serves: Chetumal, Quintana Roo, Mexico
- Time zone: EST (UTC-05:00)
- Elevation AMSL: 12 m / 39 ft
- Coordinates: 18°30′16.8″N 88°19′36.65″W
- Website: www.grupomundomaya.com/CTM

Map
- Location of airport in Quintana Roo CTM (Mexico)

Runways
| Direction | Length | | Surface |
| Direction | m | ft | Surface |
|---|---|---|---|
| 10/28 | 2,208 | 7,244 | Asphalt |

Statistics (2025)
- Total passengers: 423,144
- Ranking in Mexico: 42nd ▼1
- Source: Agencia Federal de Aviación Civil

Chetumal International Airport (Spanish: Aeropuerto Internacional de Chetumal) (IATA: CTM, ICAO: MMCM) is an international airport located in Chetumal, Quintana Roo, Mexico, near the Belize–Mexico border. It serves domestic flights for Chetumal and the southern Quintana Roo region, while also supporting various executive and general aviation activities, and hosting Mexican Navy facilities. Since 2023, the airport has been operated by Grupo Olmeca-Maya-Mexica (GAFSACOMM), a holding company owned by the Mexican military. In terms of traffic, the airport handled 423,144 passengers in 2025, which was a decrease of 2.40% compared to the previous year.

== History ==
Since its early years, multiple airlines have operated at Chetumal International Airport, with Aerocaribe serving as a major operator that later evolved into MexicanaClick, operating at the airport until its bankruptcy in 2010. Interjet, Aviacsa, and ALMA de Mexico also provided services during the 2000s, each facing bankruptcy in their respective times.

In an effort to fill the void left by MexicanaClick, Aeromexico attempted to take over services. However, the competitive pricing of Interjet rendered Aeromexico's operations to Chetumal financially unsustainable. The airport underwent significant renovations and a runway and passenger terminal expansion in 2011. Despite Aeromexico ending its service to Chetumal in 2013, it resumed in 2020 through Aeromexico Connect.

From 1974 to 2023, Aeropuertos y Servicios Auxiliares (ASA) managed the airport. However, in 2023, airport management transitioned to Grupo Olmeca Maya Mexica, aligning with the López Obrador administration's controversial strategy to involve the armed forces in significant infrastructure projects. This militarization trend has impacted various initiatives, including the Tren Maya, where the Chetumal Airport Train Station is projected as the terminus for the Cancún-Chetumal line, also serving as Chetumal's primary train station. Additionally, it played a role in the attempted revival of Mexicana de Aviación, which initially announced flights to Chetumal, temporarily canceled the service and finally launched them in December 2023.

Previously, it operates international flights to United States and Belize. which was served by foreign carriers including American Eagle and Tropic Air.

== Facilities ==
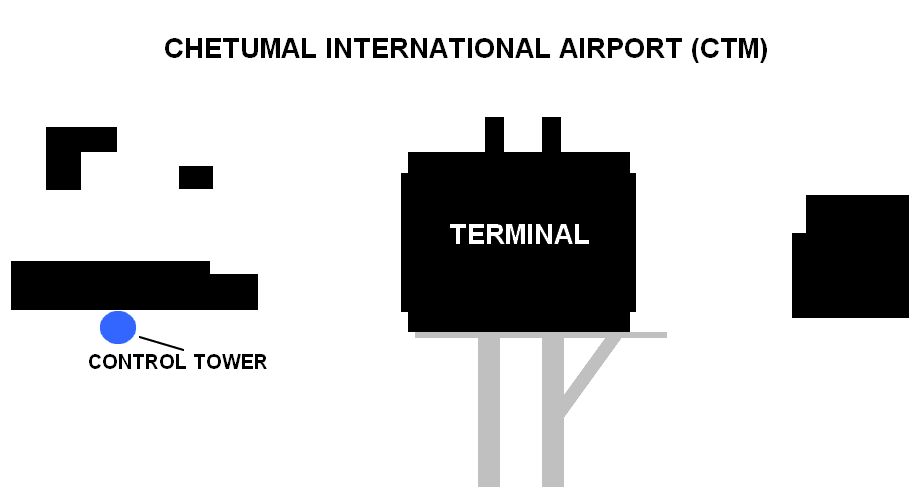
Terminal map

The airport is situated at an elevation of 12 metres (39 ft) above mean sea level, covering an area of 230 hectares (570 acres). It features a single asphalt runway, designated as 10/28, measuring 2,208 metres (7,244 ft). The commercial aviation apron spans 13,140 square metres (141,400 sq ft), featuring two parking positions for narrow-body aircraft and additional stands for general aviation. Official operating hours are from 7:00 to 19:00.

The passenger terminal caters to both domestic arrivals and departures in a single-story structure. It includes check-in areas, a security checkpoint, a baggage claim area, and an arrivals hall with car rental services, taxi stands, and several retail stores. Before security, there is a small selection of shops plus a ScotiaBank ATM. The departures concourse includes two gates with direct access to the apron, allowing passengers to board their planes by walking to the aircraft. There are also Cafe 747 selling hot food, a kiosk serving sandwiches and cold drinks, and a small shop with a range of snacks and gifts. Adjacent facilities include parking areas, civil aviation hangars, administration offices, courier and logistic facilities, and facilities for general aviation.

Currently under construction on the airport grounds is a Tren Maya station called Chetumal Airport railway station (Spanish: Estación de Chetumal Aeropuerto), aiming to establish connectivity with Tulum International Airport, Cancun International Airport, and other key tourist destinations in southeastern Mexico.

Chetumal Naval Air Base (Spanish: Base Aeronaval de Chetumal) is a facility of the Mexican Navy located at the eastern end of the airport grounds. The base hosts the following units:

- 1st Patrol Naval Air Squadron – operating Lancair Super ES, MX-7-180A, RC695
- 3rd Air Mobility, Observation and Transport Naval Air Squadron – operating Mi-8

== Airlines and destinations ==
=== Passenger ===
| Airlines | Destinations |
|---|---|
| Aeroméxico | Mexico City–Benito Juárez |
| Aeroméxico Connect | Mexico City–Benito Juárez |
| Mexicana de Aviación | Mexico City–Felipe Ángeles |
| Viva | Mexico City–Benito Juárez, Mexico City–Felipe Ángeles |
| Volaris | Mexico City–Benito Juárez |

=== Destinations map ===
Destinations from Chetumal International Airport
Red = Year-round destination
Blue = Future destination
Green = Seasonal destination

== Statistics ==
=== Annual Traffic ===
Passenger statistics at CTM
| Year | Total Passengers | change % | Cargo movements (t) | Air operations |
| 2006 | 93,533 | Steady | 301 | 6,274 |
| 2007 | 112,169 | ▲19.92% | 321 | 6,420 |
| 2008 | 121,316 | ▲8.15% | 329 | 6,623 |
| 2009 | 104,646 | ▼13.74% | 195 | 6,214 |
| 2010 | 95,687 | ▼8.56% | 140 | 5,296 |
| 2011 | 129,615 | ▲35.46% | 114 | 5,282 |
| 2012 | 156,838 | ▲21.00% | 95 | 5,553 |
| 2013 | 151,087 | ▼3.67% | - | 4,454 |
| 2014 | 155,799 | ▲3.12% | 24 | 4,540 |
| 2015 | 179,377 | ▲15.13% | 91 | 4,728 |
| 2016 | 209,972 | ▲17.06% | 99 | 4,981 |
| 2017 | 275,610 | ▲31.26% | 193 | 6,297 |
| 2018 | 321,785 | ▲16.75% | 1,345 | 5,916 |
| 2019 | 368,332 | ▲14.47% | 1,424 | 5,623 |
| 2020 | 152,640 | ▼58.56% | 43 | 3,174 |
| 2021 | 279,525 | ▲83.13% | 31 | 4,452 |
| 2022 | 374,152 | ▲33.85% | 397 | 5,353 |
| 2023 | 335,088 | ▼11.25% | 302 | 4,735 |
| 2024 | 433,527 | ▲34.01% | 37 | 4,659 |
| 2025 | 423,144 | ▼2.39% | 1,163 | 4,277 |

=== Busiest routes ===
Busiest routes from CTM (Jan–Dec 2025)
| Rank | Airport | Passengers |
|---|---|---|
| 1 | Mexico City, Mexico City | 171,649 |
| 2 | Mexico City–AIFA, State of Mexico | 37,020 |
| 3 | Cancún, Quintana Roo | 371 |

== Accidents and incidents ==
On 6 January 1972, a Hawker Siddeley HS.748-230 belonging to SAESA (Servicios Aereos Especiales Airlines) crashed shortly after take-off from Chetumal on its way to Mérida, killing five crew members and 18 passengers.

== See also ==
- List of the busiest airports in Mexico
- List of airports in Mexico
- List of airports by ICAO code: M
- List of busiest airports in North America
- List of the busiest airports in Latin America
- Transportation in Mexico
- Tourism in Mexico
- List of beaches in Mexico
- Riviera Maya
- Tren Maya
- Chetumal Airport railway station
