= Vincent Walters =

Vincent Legrend Walters is a Mexican-American murder suspect who was one of the U.S. Marshals Service's 15 Most Wanted Fugitives.

== Background ==
Walters was born in Mexico, but grew up in the San Diego area. In 1988, Walters was caught by an undercover Drug Enforcement Administration operation after allegedly purchasing $20,000 worth of chemicals to make methamphetamine and negotiating a $200,000 deal with the undercover agents.

Walters is accused of the kidnapping and murder of Kristine Suzzette Reyes in September 1988. As the U.S. Marshals described of the crime,

When one of his associates became paranoid holding onto the finished methamphetamine, Walters handed it off to a local drug dealer, who in turn gave it to his friend Jay Bareno. Wanting their drugs back, Walters tracked down the local dealer, who no longer had the drugs, and kidnapped him, along with his friend and his friend's girlfriend, Kristine Suzzette Reyes, to trade them to Bareno for the drugs. Bareno agreed to exchange the drugs for the hostages. After returning the drugs, the two male hostages were released, but Kristine Suzzette Reyes was murdered by gagging her with a chemically saturated rag that killed Kristine almost instantaneously.

== Disappearance and capture ==
Martin Walters, Vincent's brother, was sentenced to 25 years to life in prison for the kidnapping, but Vincent Walters fled. In July 1989, a federal grand jury indicted Vincent Walters on conspiracy to manufacture, possess and distribute crystal methamphetamine, carrying firearms during a drug trafficking crime, and possession of unregistered firearms and explosives.

According to the Marshals Service, Walters had been living in Cancún, Mexico under the assumed name of "Oscar Rivera". Walters worked for 10 years at Cancún International Airport, where he reportedly sold timeshare vacation packages for a resort located in Puerto Morelos. On July 13, 2012, Walters, age 45, was apprehended at his workplace in Cancún International Airport after 24 years on the run. Walters faces extradition to San Diego, where he will be tried in the U.S. District Court for the kidnapping and murder of Kristine Suzzette Reyes, and drugs, firearms and explosives offences.

=== Prosecution ===
In 2015, Walters pleaded guilty to first degree murder and two counts of kidnapping for ransom. He was sentenced to 32 years to life in prison.
