= Teya Mérida railway station =

Railway station in Yucatán, Mexico

Teya Mérida
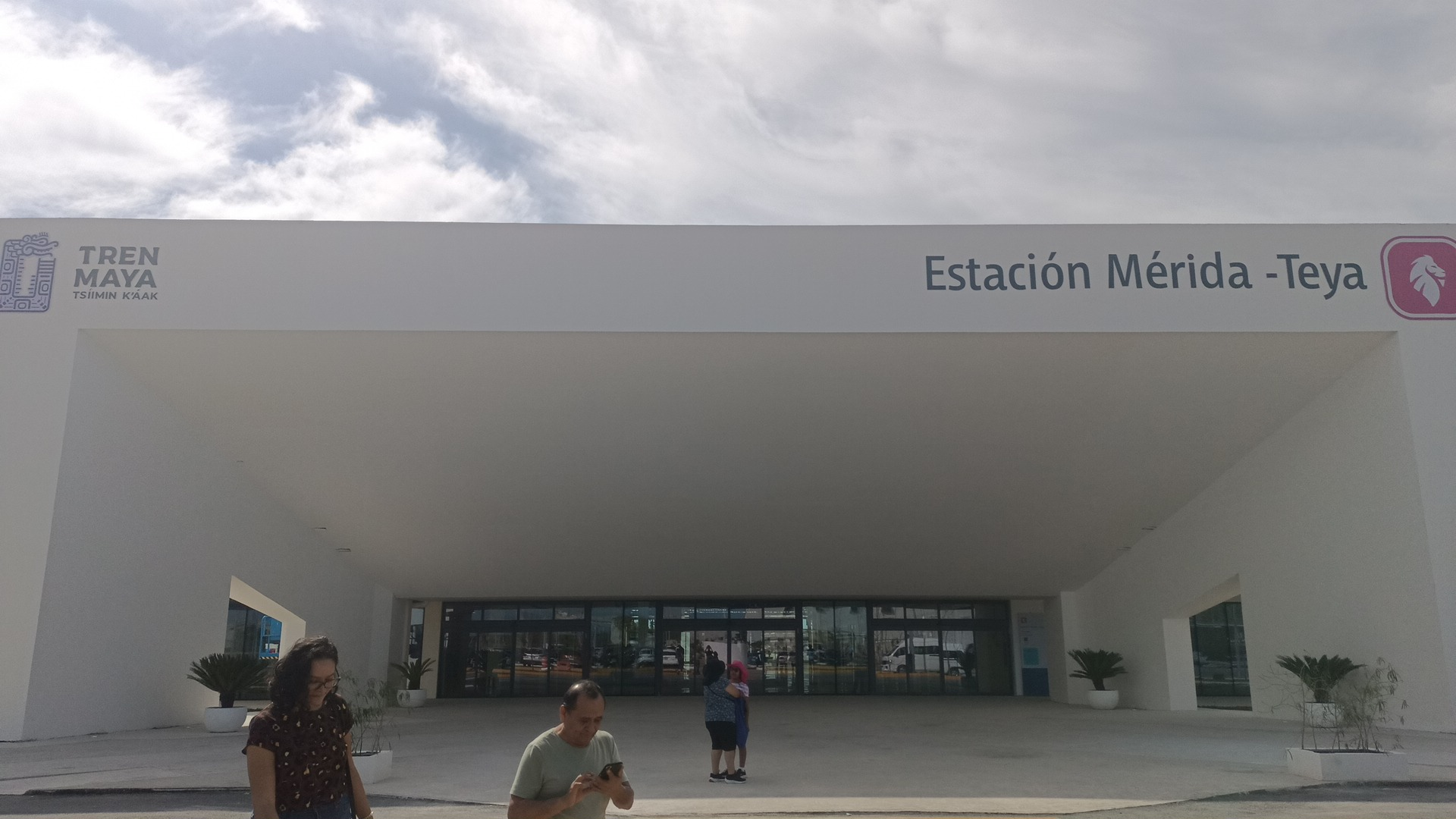

General information
- Location: Kanasín Municipality
- Coordinates: 20.92875°N 89.51461°W
- Platforms: 2 side platforms 2 island platforms
- Tracks: 7
- Connections: Ie-Tram Yucatán:

Services
Preceding station	Tren Maya	Following station
Umán toward Palenque	Tren Maya	Tixkokob toward Cancún Airport
Location

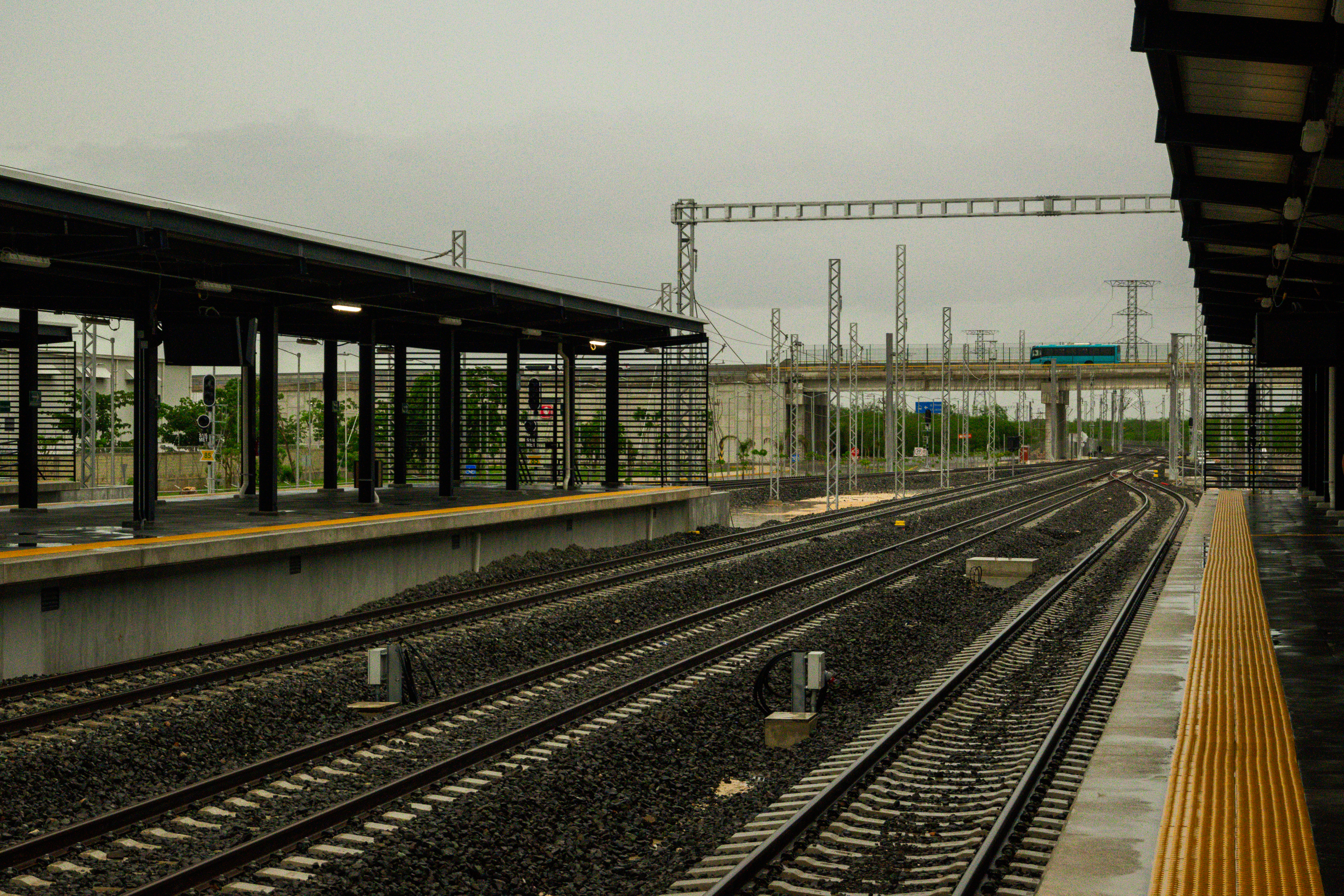
Track and station platform

Teya Mérida is a train station in Kanasín Municipality, Yucatán.

== History ==
Andrés Manuel López Obrador announced the Tren Maya project in his 2018 presidential campaign. On 13 August 2018, he announced the complete outline. The route of the new Tren Maya put Teya Mérida station on the route that would connect Calkiní railway station and Izamal railway station.

The station will have a high tourist demand, and so, has seven tracks and four platforms.

== Characteristics ==
Its facilities consist of a main building with a plaza, garden area, operational area, parking, elevators, escalators, and the four platforms.

The station is located east of Mérida and is connected to it by the Ie-Tram bus rapid transit system.

== See also ==
- Rail transport in Mexico
