= X'Trapolis Tsíimin K'áak =

Train manufactured by Alstom

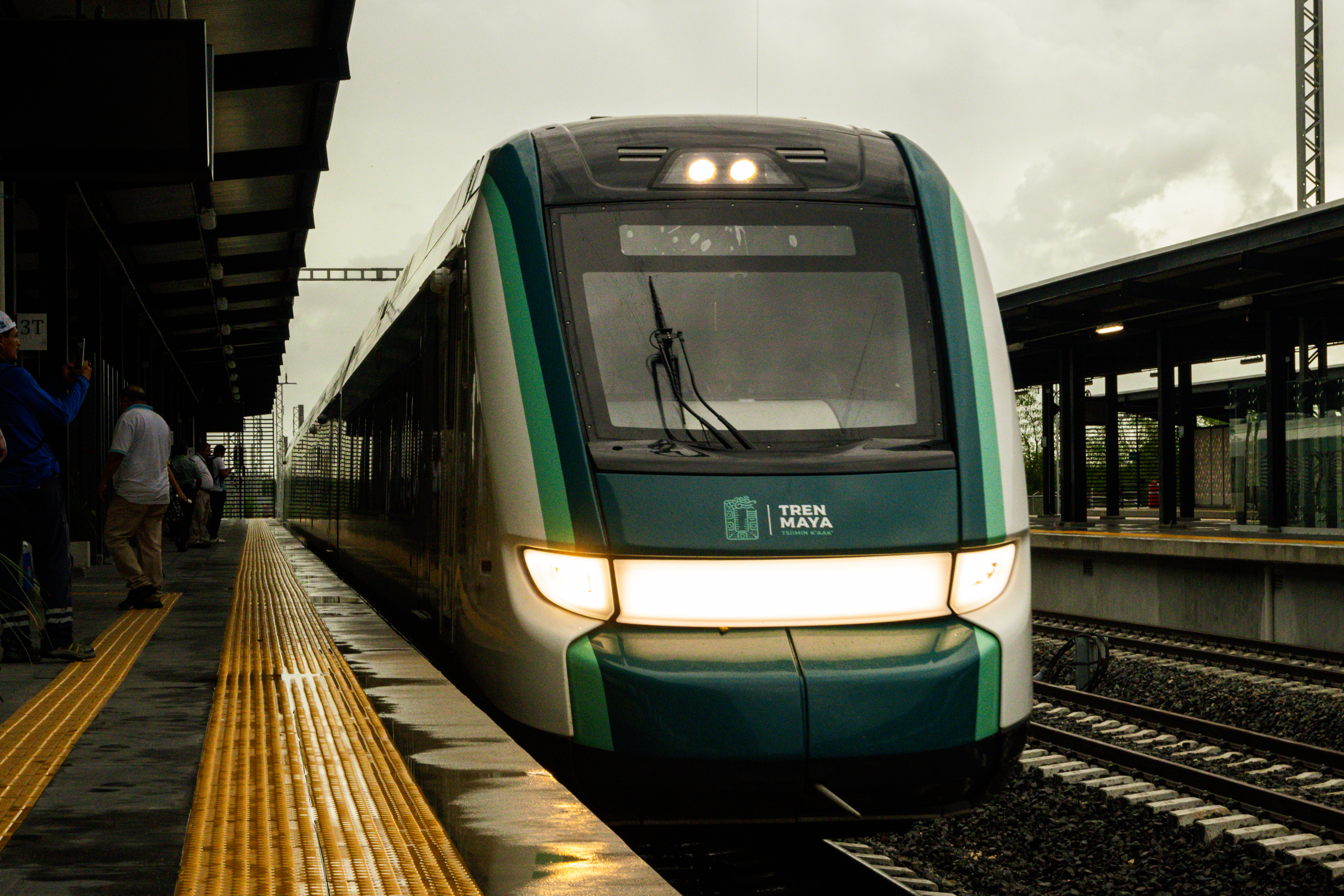
- In service: December 15, 2023–present
- Manufacturer: Alstom
- Family name: X'Trapolis
- Constructed: 2021–2025
- Number built: 42 sets (planned)
- Formation: 4-to-7-car sets
- Capacity: 140 (Janal model); 260 (P´atal model); 230–430 (Xiinbal model)
- Line served: Tren Maya

Specifications
- Car length: 25.5 m (83 ft 7 15/16 in)
- Width: 3,046 mm (9 ft 11 15/16 in)
- Height: 4,214 mm (13 ft 9 7/8 in)
- Floor height: 1,185 mm (3 ft 10.7 in)
- Maximum speed: 180 km/h (110 mph) (design); 160 km/h (99 mph) (service)
- Weight: 49 t (48 long tons; 54 short tons)
- Track gauge: 1,435 mm (4 ft 8 1/2 in) standard gauge

The X'Trapolis Tsíimin K'áak is a multiple unit train built by Alstom. It is part of the X'Trapolis series of suburban trains. It is used on the Tren Maya in Mexico, also called Tsíimin K'áak in Mayan. In total, 42 trains will be built, consisting of 4 to 7 cars.

On the morning of August 30, 2023, the first tests of the rolling stock were carried out. On September 1, 2023, tests were carried out between Campeche and Yucatán.

== History ==
=== Proposals ===
In 2021, CAF and Alstom presented their proposals for the construction of 42 trains that must meet the demand of passengers of the Tren Maya. The decision on these proposals was announced by the Fondo Nacional de Fomento al Turismo on 26 May the same year.

Alstom would win the contract from the Spanish CAF for 36,563 million pesos, despite obtaining a lower technical score. The French company won the international competition to supply 42 trains.

=== Construction ===
The manufacturing of the trains began in September 2022, and the first car was completed in November 2022. The first train was delivered on July 8, 2023.

On August 8, 2023, the train moved for the first time. Between August 12 and 13, the first dynamic tests can be carried out, during which 15,000 kilometers worth of tests will be conducted. It is expected that in December of that year 13 trains will be delivered, of which six of them will be fully tested.

Alstom highlighted that the first set delivered is made up of 2 motor cars and 2 trailer cars.

In total, 42 trains will be built, consisting of 4 to 7 cars. Of these trains, 32 of them will be electro-diesel multiple units, 10 will be standard diesel multiple units.

Alstom expects to deliver the last of the 219 wagons that complete the project to the National Fund for Tourism Promotion (Fondo Nacional de Fomento al Turismo, FONATUR) in the last quarter of 2024.

== Characteristics ==
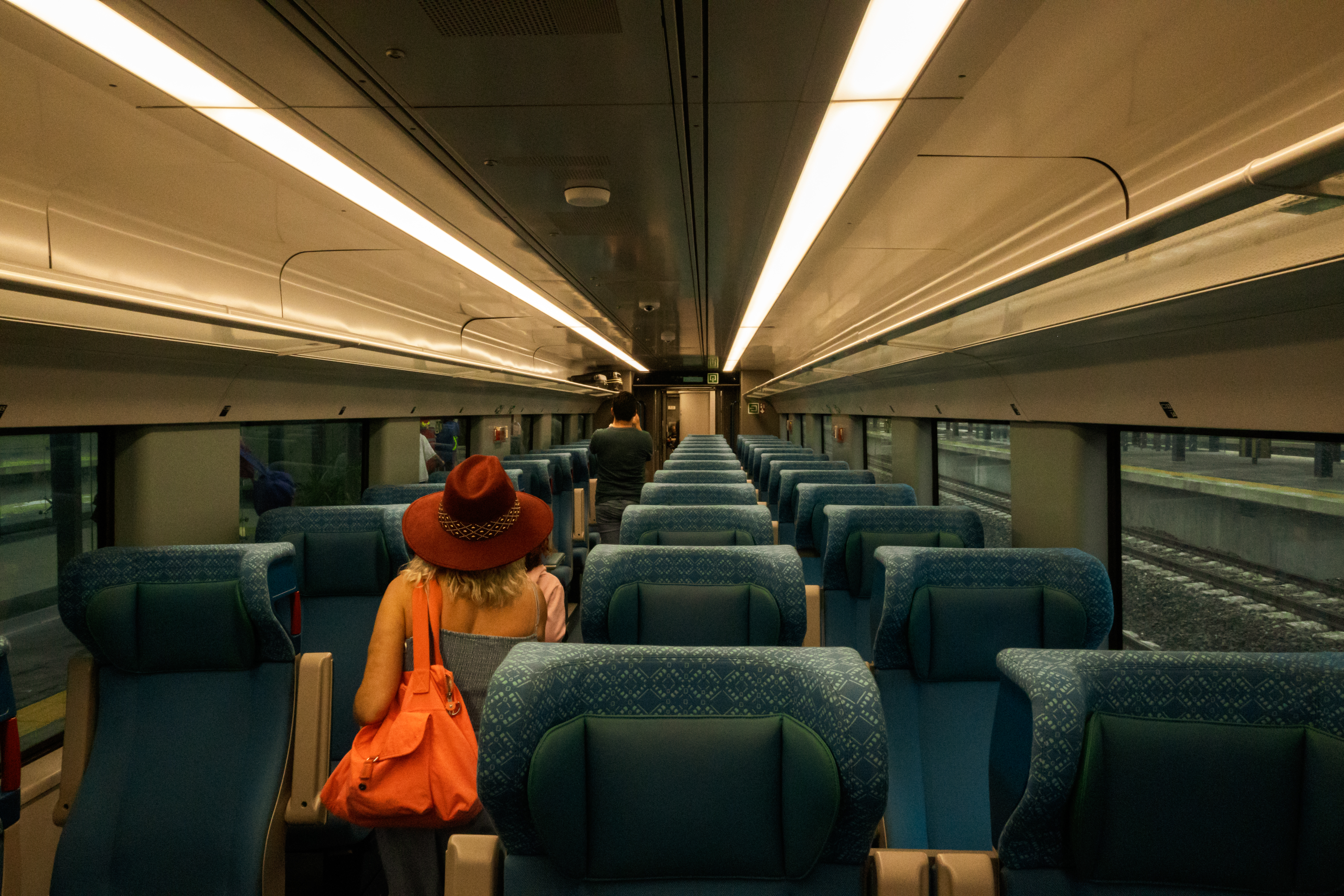
Premier class Clerprem seats in a Tren Maya car

The train cars have closed circuit television, lighting, air conditioning, a cafeteria, bathrooms, internet, Wi-Fi, and large windows, as well as spaces for people with reduced mobility, both in the seats, in the dining room and in the cabins.

The trains of this model, from the beginning, already have advanced digital technologies, including a European Rail Traffic Management System (ERTMS), to provide optimal efficiency and high levels of safety.

In addition, HealthHub and TrainScanner, digital solutions for predictive maintenance, will be deployed, enabling continuous monitoring of the conditions of different train components, signalling and infrastructure to ensure maximum reliability and availability, while optimising the lifecycle costs of each train car. In other words, this will serve to optimize the preventive and corrective maintenance of the formations as well as to make the work of the driver who will be in charge of assuming the command of the train more efficient.

== Train types ==
For the Tren Maya, these formations come in 3 different configurations depending on the type of service to be occupied:

- Xiinbal ("to walk" in Mayan): standard configuration composed of trains from 4 cars (capacity 230 passengers) to 7 cars (430 passengers). This configuration is made for intercity transport aimed at the common public and tourism that requires mobility at a cheaper cost. This formation can integrate a cafeteria (31 formations between both numerical configurations).
- Janal ("to eat" in Mayan): standard configuration composed of trains of 4 cars (140 passengers) differs from the previous configuration by the addition of a restaurant car and in which dishes from the region it serves can be served and tasted (8 formations without changes in their size).
- P'aatal ("to remain" in Mayan): standard configuration composed of trains of 7 cars (260 passengers). This is a setup focused on long-distance travel. It has single cabins with seats that can be converted into a bed equipped with a toilet and shower. It also has a restaurant car (3 formations without changes in size).

The Tren Maya offers service in tourist class and premier class.
