= Tenosique Municipality =

Municipality in the Mexican state of Tabasco

Coordinates: 17°28′N 91°25′W

Tenosique
- Municipality
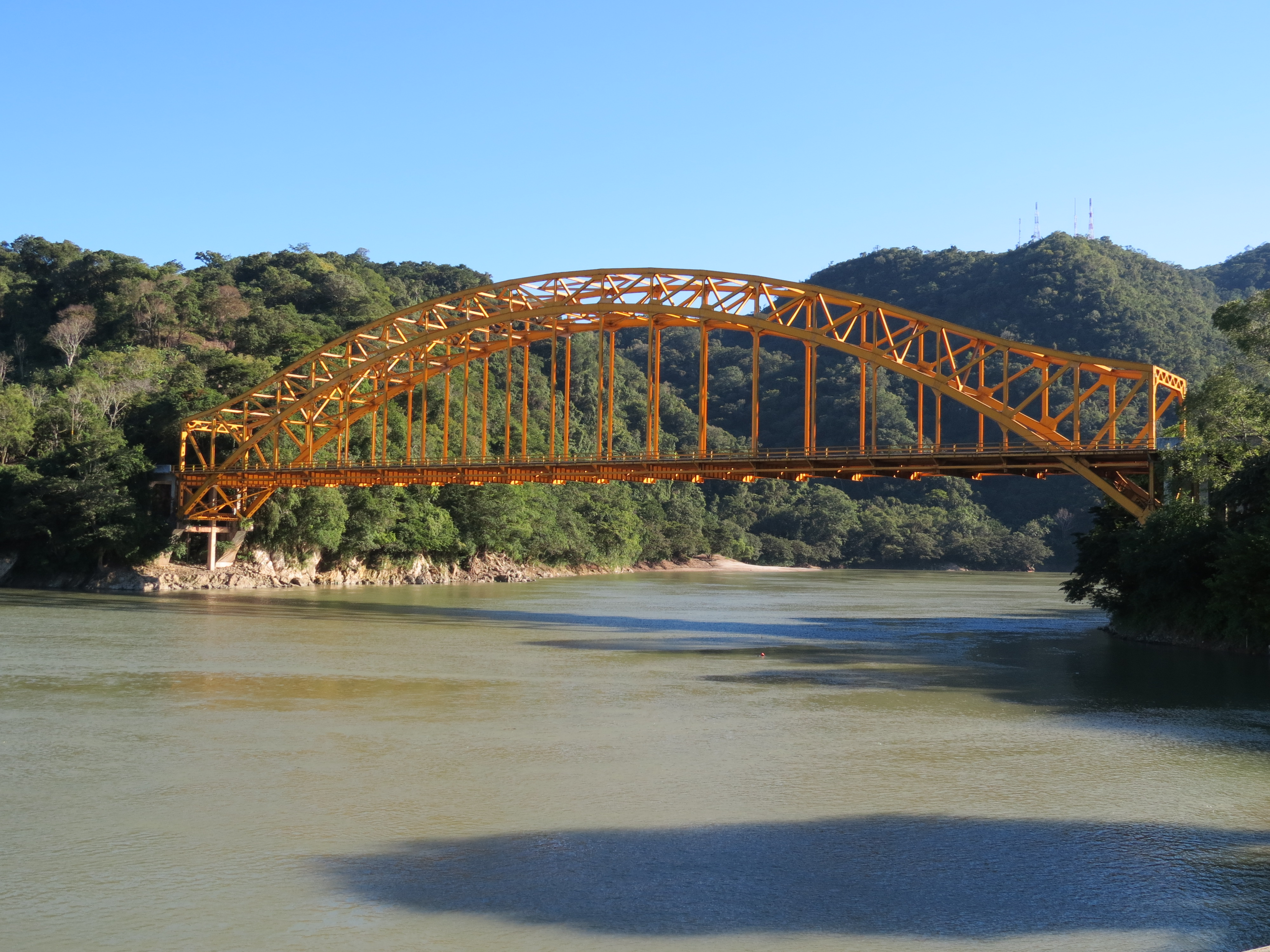
- "Boca del Cerro" bridge located in the municipality

- Location of the municipality in Tabasco.
- Country: Mexico
- State: Tabasco
- Seat: Tenosique de Pino Suárez

Government
  - Federal electoral district: Tabasco's 1st

Population (2020)
  - Total: 62,310
- Time zone: UTC-6 (Zona Centro)

Tenosique is a municipality in the Mexican state of Tabasco. The municipal seat is the town of Tenosique.

== Geography ==
The municipality has an area of 2,098.1 km^{2} (810.1 sq mi) and includes many small outlying communities.

Cañón del Usumacinta Flora and Fauna Protection Area is located in the municipality.
