= Cancún Airport railway station =

Railway station in Quintana Roo, Mexico

Cancún Airport
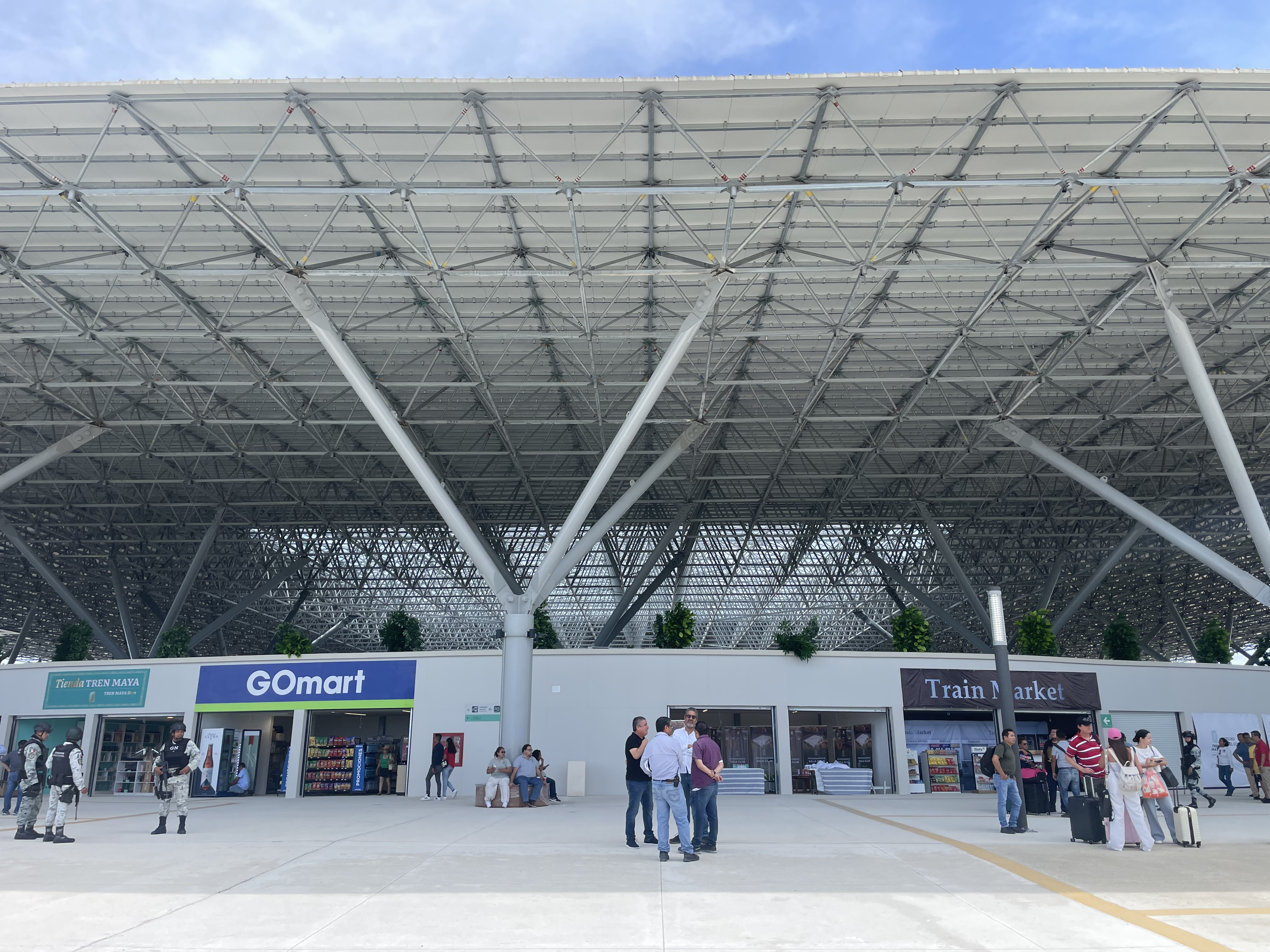

General information
- Location: Quintana Roo, Mexico
- Coordinates: 21.02808°N 86.87281°W
- Platforms: 5
- Tracks: 9
- Connections: Conexión Intermodal Tren Maya

History
- Opened: December 15, 2023

Services
Preceding station	Tren Maya	Following station
Leona Vicario toward Palenque	Tren Maya	Terminus
Puerto Morelos toward Palenque	Tren Maya	Terminus
Location

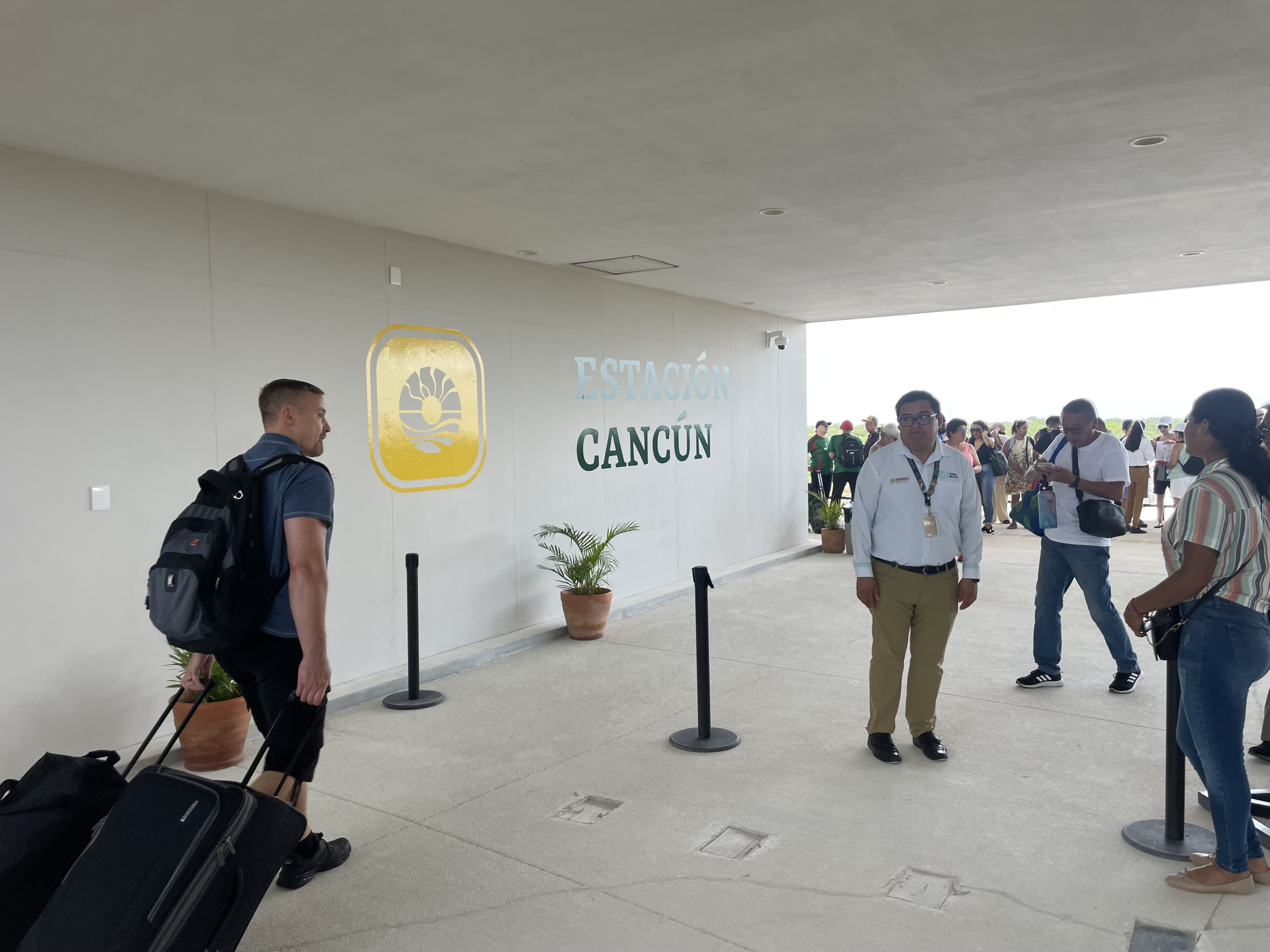
Tren Maya Cancún station sign

Cancún Airport is a train station located across Federal Highway 180 from Cancún International Airport. It is the most important station on the entire Tren Maya network, served by trains to all other stations.

== Tren Maya ==
Andrés Manuel López Obrador announced the Tren Maya project in his 2018 presidential campaign. On 13 August 2018, he announced the complete outline. The new Tren Maya put Cancún Airport on the route connecting Yucatán and Quintana Roo.

== Characteristics ==
The station was constructed by Empresas ICA, which is also building section 4 of the Tren Maya. Two lines converge in Cancún: Line 4, which will connect Cancún with Izamal railway station, Yucatán, and Line 5, which will go from this city to Playa del Carmen. The Cancún station is the largest on the entire network, with it having 10 platforms. Additionally, it will be served by the Conexión Intermodal Tren Maya shuttle bus to the international airport.

The station covers an area of 34,745 m^{2} (3.4745 ha; 8.586 acres), and it is designed by TEN Arquitectos.

As of 2024 the station in Cancún Airport is open and receives local, national and international travelers.
