= Palenque railway station =

Railway station in Palenque, Chiapas, Mexico

Palenque
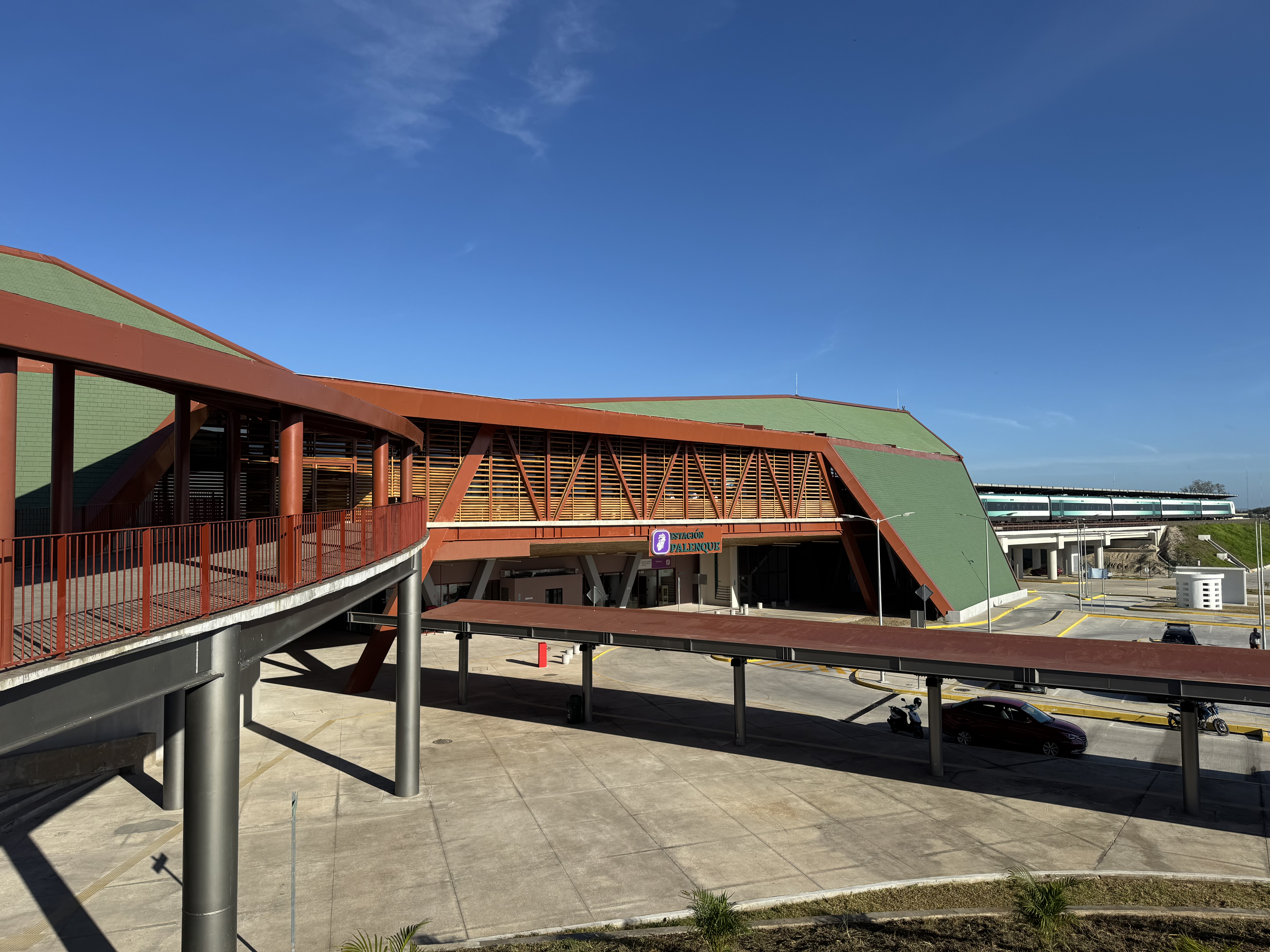

General information
- Location: Palenque, Chiapas, Mexico
- Coordinates: 17.53326°N 91.97951°W
- Platforms: 1
- Tracks: 2
- Connections: Tren Interoceánico: Line FA (at Pakal Ná (Palenque), via a short walk)

History
- Opened: 1 January 2024 (Tren Maya)

Services
Preceding station	Tren Maya	Following station
Terminus	Tren Maya	Boca del Cerro toward Cancún Airport
Location

Palenque is a railway station located in Palenque, Chiapas. The station is built on the grounds of the old city airport, where apart from the station, which is the first structure of a new sustainable community between the villages of Palenque and Pakal Ná.

== History ==
In 2018, the then-presidential candidate Andrés Manuel López Obrador announced his Tren Maya project. On 13 August 2018, he announced its full route, with Palenque as its first station.

In 2022, construction work on the station began. It was designed by Gabriela Bojalil of DAFDF Architecture and Urbanism. On 31 December 2023, the station was opened by President Andrés Manuel López Obrador.

== Characteristics ==
The station's architecture seeks to align itself with these aspects and was inspired by its form and materials in elements of ancient art and vernacular architecture. The station was a finalist at the Archello 2025 Awards (Premios Archello 2025) in the Transport Hubs category.
