= 105.7 FM =

FM radio frequency

The following radio stations broadcast on FM frequency 105.7 MHz:

== Argentina ==
- A in Mendoza
- Cadena norte in Jesús María, Córdoba
- Cien in Villa Carlos Paz, Córdoba
- Ciudad in Bahía Blanca, Buenos Aires
- Corazón Disco in Buenos Aires
- Diagonal in Machagai, Chaco
- Famailla in Famaillá, Tucumán
- Glaciar in Río Gallegos, Santa Cruz
- Imaginate in Chivilcoy, Buenos Aires
- La Misma Fe in San Nicolás de los Arroyos, Buenos Aires
- Oasis in Puan, Buenos Aires
- Ok in Florencio Varela, Buenos Aires
- Pasión in Rosario, Santa Fe
- Planeta in Buenos Aires
- Redentor in Rosario, Santa Fe
- Radio María in San Martín, Mendoza

== Australia ==
- 8DDD in Darwin, Northern Territory
- 2KY in Taree, New South Wales
- ABC Far North in Cooktown, Queensland
- ABC NewsRadio in Mount Gambier, South Australia
- 2HVR in Muswellbrook, New South Wales
- ABC Western Queensland in Roma, Queensland
- Radio National in Toowoomba, Queensland
- Radio National in Woomera, South Australia
- Rhema FM in Mount Isa, Queensland
- SBS Radio in Hobart, Tasmania
- 2BDR in Albury, New South Wales
- 2JJJ in Sydney, New South Wales
- Radio Metro in Gold Coast, Queensland

== Brazil ==
- ZYD 658 in Santa Maria, Rio Grande do Sul

== Canada (Channel 289) ==
- CBAF-FM-2 in Allardville, New Brunswick
- CBAM-FM-1 in Sackville, New Brunswick
- CBU-FM in Vancouver, British Columbia
- CBYS-FM in Sparwood, British Columbia
- CFDM-FM in Meadow Lake, Saskatchewan
- CFGL-FM in Laval, Quebec
- CHQC-FM in Saint John, New Brunswick
- CHRE-FM in St. Catharines, Ontario
- CIBQ-FM in Brooks, Alberta
- CICF-FM in Vernon, British Columbia
- CIKR-FM in Kingston, Ontario
- CJMI-FM in Strathroy, Ontario
- CKKN-FM-2 in Mackenzie, British Columbia
- VOAR-9-FM in Corner Brook, Newfoundland and Labrador

== China ==
- CNR Tibetan Radio in Lhasa
- SMG Shanghai Jiao Tong Tai in Shanghai
- GRT Voice Of Pearl River channel in Shenzhen

== Iraq ==
- XFM 105.7

== Israel ==
- Kol BaRama

== Italy ==
- Radio Ciroma 105.7 in Cosenza, Calabria

== Malaysia ==
- Ai FM in Kota Bharu, Kelantan
- Lite in Klang Valley and Eastern Pahang
- Nasional FM in Johor Bahru, Johor and Singapore

== Mexico ==
- XHBM-FM in San Luis Potosí, San Luis Potosí
- XHCCFG-FM in Juan Aldama, Zacatecas
- XHDE-FM in Arteaga, Coahuila
- XHECH-FM in Purépero, Michoacán
- XHEMI-FM in Cosoleacaque, Veracruz
- XHIU-FM in Oaxaca, Oaxaca
- XHJAC-FM in Jacona-Zamora, Michoacán
- XHLJ-FM in Lagos de Moreno, Jalisco
- XHOF-FM in Mexico City
- XHOS-FM in Ciudad Obregón, Sonora
- XHPRS-FM in Tecate, Baja California
- XHPUGC-FM in Úrsulo Galván-Cardel, Veracruz
- XHR-FM in Linares, Nuevo León
- XHRUC-FM in Ciudad Cuauhtémoc, Chihuahua
- XHTH-FM in Palizada, Campeche
- XHVOC-FM in Bahía de Kino, Sonora
- XHXT-FM in Tepic, Nayarit

== Nigeria ==
- Jusmen 105.7 FM in Lagos

== Philippines ==
- DWRQ in Iba, Zambales
- DZVH in Boac, Marinduque
- DYML-FM in Roxas City, Capiz
- DYVW in Borongan City
- DYSJ in Bayawan City
- DYSO in Hinigaran, Negros Occidental
- DYSN in Allen, Northern Samar
- DYSQ-FM in Siquijor, Negros Oriental
- DXRS in Gingoog City
- DXIF-FM in Caraga, Davao Oriental
- DXVV-FM in Pagadian City
- DXBX-FM in Valencia City, Bukidnon
- DXRW in Bayugan City
- DXIA-FM in Kidapawan City

== Saint Vincent and the Grenadines ==
- Praise FM (Saint Vincent and the Grenadines)

== South Korea ==
- Korea New Network's Seoul Broadcasting System's Radio Station LOVE FM Relay Chanel

== United Kingdom ==
- Capital Scotland in Edinburgh and Fife
- Mearns FM in Stonehaven
- Heart North and Mid Wales in Llandudno
- Heart South Wales in Pembrokeshire
- Smooth West Midlands in Birmingham and the West Midlands

== United States (Channel 289) ==
- KBGB in Magness, Arkansas
- KBIC in Raymondville, Texas
- KCPJ-LP in Crete, Nebraska
- KDIL-LP in Kennewick, Washington
- KDXN in South Heart, North Dakota
- KHCB-FM in Houston, Texas
- KJET in Union, Washington
- KJJP in Amarillo, Texas
- KJRL in Herington, Kansas
- KJVI in Robert Lee, Texas
- KKQX in Manhattan, Montana
- KMCK-FM in Prairie Grove, Arkansas
- KMDG in Hays, Kansas
- KMVN in Anchorage, Alaska
- KNAF-FM in Fredericksburg, Texas
- KOAS in Dolan Springs, Arizona
- KOHM in Ridgecrest, California
- KOKZ in Waterloo, Iowa
- KOZZ-FM in Reno, Nevada
- KPMX in Sterling, Colorado
- KPNT in Collinsville, Illinois
- KQAK in Bend, Oregon
- KQMX in Lost Hills, California
- KRBL in Idalou, Texas
- KRDR in Alva, Oklahoma
- KRNB in Decatur, Texas
- KROU in Spencer, Oklahoma
- KRSE in Yakima, Washington
- KSUX in Winnebago, Nebraska
- KTKO (FM) in Beeville, Texas
- KTYV in Steamboat Springs, Colorado
- KUXX in Jackson, Minnesota
- KVAY in Lamar, Colorado
- KVGL in Manderson, Wyoming
- KVRD-FM in Cottonwood, Arizona
- KVRU-LP in Seattle, Washington
- KVVF in Santa Clara, California
- KVVP in Leesville, Louisiana
- KWBR-LP in Saint George, Utah
- KWGL in Ouray, Colorado
- KXCJ-LP in Cave Junction, Oregon
- KXKX in Knob Noster, Missouri
- KXRS in Hemet, California
- KYKX in Longview, Texas
- KZBD in Spokane, Washington
- KZGI in Sedro-Woolley, Washington
- WAKH in McComb, Mississippi
- WAPL in Appleton, Wisconsin
- WBNW-FM in Endicott, New York
- WBZY in Canton, Georgia
- WCFW in Chippewa Falls, Wisconsin
- WCHR-FM in Manahawkin, New Jersey
- WCJZ in Cannelton, Indiana
- WCLN-FM in Rennert, North Carolina
- WCSN-FM in Orange Beach, Alabama
- WCUP in L'anse, Michigan
- WDTL in Indianola, Mississippi
- WECA-LP in Palm Bay, Florida
- WEMA-LP in Marlborough, Pennsylvania
- WEMZ-LP in Plymouth, Pennsylvania
- WERF-LP in Gainesville, Florida
- WETF-LP in South Bend, Indiana
- WFFM in Ashburn, Georgia
- WFRF-FM in Monticello, Florida
- WGAY in Sugarloaf Key, Florida
- WGEO-LP in Georgetown, South Carolina
- WGRK-FM in Greensburg, Kentucky
- WHBE-FM in Eminence, Kentucky
- WHMX in Lincoln, Maine
- WHTI in Salem, West Virginia
- WHWS-LP in Geneva, New York
- WIHG in Rockwood, Tennessee
- WIXO in Peoria, Illinois
- WJGM in Baldwin, Florida
- WJKL in San Juan, Puerto Rico
- WJUK-LP in Plymouth, Indiana
- WJZ-FM in Catonsville, Maryland
- WKJS in Richmond, Virginia
- WLBM-LP in Danville, Illinois
- WLGC-FM in Greenup, Kentucky
- WLKC in Campton, New Hampshire
- WLKJ in Portage, Pennsylvania
- WLUB in Augusta, Georgia
- WLWM-LP in Charlestown, New Hampshire
- WMCC-LP in Spencer, West Virginia
- WMJI in Cleveland, Ohio
- WMXH-FM in Luray, Virginia
- WPGR-LP in Clear Lake, Wisconsin
- WQAH-FM in Addison, Alabama
- WQAK in Union City, Tennessee
- WQBK-FM in Malta, New York
- WQJT-LP in Freeport, Illinois
- WQXA-FM in York, Pennsylvania
- WROR-FM in Framingham, Massachusetts
- WRSF in Columbia, North Carolina
- WSRW-FM in Grand Rapids, Michigan
- WSVP-LP in Springvale, Maine
- WTBK in Manchester, Kentucky
- WUCL in De Kalb, Mississippi
- WUUK-LP in Canadohta Lake, Pennsylvania
- WUZR in Bicknell, Indiana
- WVBZ in Clemmons, North Carolina
- WWLL in Sebring, Florida
- WWWM-FM in Eden Prairie, Minnesota
- WXCX in Siren, Wisconsin
- WXPB-LP in Athens, Georgia
- WXZX in Hilliard, Ohio
- WYXB in Indianapolis, Indiana
- WZHT in Troy, Alabama
- WZOM in Defiance, Ohio
- WZTK in Alpena, Michigan
