= List of radio stations in Campeche =

This is a list of radio stations in the Mexican state of Campeche, which can be sorted by their call signs, frequencies, location, ownership, names, and programming formats.

Radio stations in Campeche
Call sign	Frequency	Location	Owner	Name	Format
XEXPUJ-AM	700 AM	Xpujil	National Institute of Indigenous Peoples	La Voz del Corazón de la Selva	Indigenous
XESTRC-AM	920 AM	Tenabo	Government of the State of Campeche	TRC Radio	Public radio
XEMAB-AM (Note: Linked to XHMAB-FM, which must keep XEMAB-AM on the air until there are no listeners in its service area unserved by other radio stations.)	950 AM	Ciudad del Carmen	XEMAB-AM, S.A. de C.V.	Globo	Romantic
XEBCC-AM (Note: Combo with XHBCC-FM 100.5)	1030 AM	Ciudad del Carmen	La Reverenda del Carmen, S. de R.L. de C.V.	La Reverenda	Regional Mexican
XEIT-AM (Note: Combo with XHIT-FM 99.7)	1070 AM	Ciudad del Carmen	Estéreo Carmen, S.A. de C.V.	Exa FM	Contemporary hit radio
XEBAL-AM	1470 AM	Bécal	Cadena Cultural Becaleña, A.C.	La Voz Maya de México	Cultural
XHCPBW-FM	88.5 FM	San Francisco de Campeche	Instituto Mexicano de la Radio	Altavoz Radio	Public radio
XHUACC-FM	88.9 FM	Ciudad del Carmen	Universidad Autónoma del Carmen	Radio Delfín	University
XHRTC-FM	89.3 FM	San Francisco de Campeche	Government of the State of Campeche	TRC Radio	Public radio
XHPEBN-FM	90.1 FM	San Francisco de Campeche	Miguel Ángel Valle Chan	Radio Visión	Christian
XHCCAF-FM	90.3 FM	Hopelchén	Tuukul Systems, S.A. de C.V.	—N/a	—N/a
XHPSAB-FM	90.9 FM	Sabancuy	Mediasur, S.A. de C.V.	—N/a	—N/a
XHCUA-FM	90.9 FM	San Francisco de Campeche	Universidad Autónoma de Campeche	Radio Universidad	University
XHPHOP-FM	91.9 FM	Hopelchén	Mediasur, S.A. de C.V.	—N/a	—N/a
XHPCDC-FM	92.3 FM	Ciudad del Carmen	XHPCDC-FM, S.A. de C.V.	Bandolera	Regional Mexican
XHPEBS-FM	93.1 FM	Ciudad del Carmen	Nueva Generación con Vida, A.C.	Estéreo Vida	Christian
XHPMEN-FM	93.9 FM	Ciudad del Carmen	XHPMEN-FM, S.A. de C.V.	Retro FM	Spanish classic hits
XHPSFC-FM	94.1 FM	San Francisco de Campeche	XHPSFC-FM Campeche, S.A. de C.V.	Telesur Radio	News/talk
XHPCAR-FM	95.5 FM	Ciudad del Carmen	Cancún Radio Net, S.A. de C.V.	La Comadre	Regional Mexican
XHESE-FM	96.7 FM	Champotón	Radio Comercial de Campeche, S.A.	Ke Buena	Regional Mexican
XHRAC-FM	97.3 FM	San Francisco de Campeche	Compañía Campechana de Radio, S.A.	Radio Fórmula	News/talk
XHCCAE-FM	98.5 FM	Champotón	Mediasur, S.A. de C.V.	—N/a	—N/a
XHCMN-FM (Note: Operating on an expired concession)	98.9 FM	Ciudad del Carmen	Promotora de Radio XHCMN-FM, S.A. de C.V.	Máxima	Contemporary hit radio
XHIT-FM	99.7 FM	Ciudad del Carmen	Estéreo Carmen, S.A. de C.V.	Exa FM	Contemporary hit radio
XHMI-FM	100.3 FM	San Francisco de Campeche	Radio Amiga, S.A.	Exa FM	Contemporary hit radio
XHBCC-FM	100.5 FM	Ciudad del Carmen	La Reverenda del Carmen, S. de R.L. de C.V.	La Reverenda	Regional Mexican
XHPCAL-FM	100.7 FM	Calkiní	Mediasur, S.A. de C.V.	—N/a	—N/a
XHMAB-FM (Note: Linked to XHMAB-FM, which must keep XEMAB-AM on the air until there are no listeners in its service area unserved by other radio stations.)	101.3 FM	Ciudad del Carmen	XEMAB-AM, S.A. de C.V.	Globo	Romantic
XHCAM-FM	101.9 FM	San Francisco de Campeche	Radio Campeche, S.A. de C.V.	Kiss FM	Contemporary hit radio
XHCSAS-FM	102.1 FM	Ciudad del Carmen	Sobre las Montañas de los Aromas, A.C.	VOXA	Christian
XHAC-FM	102.7 FM	San Francisco de Campeche	Radiorama del Sureste, S.A.	Ke Buena	Regional Mexican
XHESC-FM	103.9 FM	Escárcega	Radio Escárcega, S.A.	Ke Buena	Regional Mexican
XHCPAK-FM	105.1 FM	San Francisco de Campeche	Instituto Campechano	IC Radio	Cultural
XHPCAN-FM	105.5 FM	Candelaria	Mediasur, S.A. de C.V.	—N/a	—N/a
XHTH-FM	105.7 FM	Palizada	Radio Palizada, S.A.	Ke Buena	Regional Mexican
XHSCJB-FM	106.5 FM	Tepakán	Ondas Radiofónicas del Camino Real, A.C.	La Veterana	Community radio
