= El Triunfo =

El Triunfo ("the triumph" in Spanish) may refer to:

Argentina:

- El Triunfo, Buenos Aires

Ecuador:

- El Triunfo, Ecuador (Guayas province)

El Salvador:

- El Triunfo, Usulután
- Puerto El Triunfo (Usulután department)

Honduras:

- El Triunfo, Choluteca

Mexico:

- El Triunfo, Chiapas
- El Triunfo, Michoacán
- El Triunfo, Tabasco
  - El Triunfo railway station, a Tren Maya station
  - El Triunfo railway station (old), a defunct station
- El Triunfo Biosphere Reserve (Chiapas)
- El Triunfo, Baja California Sur

== See also ==
- Triunfo (disambiguation)
