= WECA =

WECA may refer to:

- West of England Combined Authority
- Wi-Fi Alliance
- UDP-N-acetylglucosamine—undecaprenyl-phosphate N-acetylglucosaminephosphotransferase, an enzyme
- UDP-N-acetylglucosamine—decaprenyl-phosphate N-acetylglucosaminephosphotransferase, an enzyme
- WECA-LP, a low-power radio station (105.7 FM) licensed to Palm Bay, Florida, United States
