= Martínez =

Martínez or Martinez may refer to:

== Places ==
=== Argentina ===
- Martínez, Buenos Aires
- Coronel Martínez de Hoz, Buenos Aires Province

=== France ===
- Hôtel Martinez, in Cannes

=== Mexico ===
- Martínez de la Torre, Veracruz

=== Spain ===
- Martínez, Ávila, a municipality in the province of Ávila, Castile and León

=== United States ===
- Martinez, California
- Martinez, Georgia
- Martinez, Texas

== Other uses ==
- Martinez (band), Swedish dansband
- Martinez (cocktail), a cocktail related to the Martini
- Martínez (surname)
- Martinez (Brazilian footballer) (born 1980), Luís Fernando Lojudice Martinez, Brazilian footballer

== See also ==
- Justice Martinez (disambiguation)
