= WecA transferase =

WecA transferase may refer to:

- UDP-N-acetylglucosamine—undecaprenyl-phosphate N-acetylglucosaminephosphotransferase, an enzyme
- UDP-N-acetylglucosamine—decaprenyl-phosphate N-acetylglucosaminephosphotransferase, an enzyme
