= KLMR =

KLMR may refer to:

- KLMR (AM), a radio station (920 AM) licensed to Lamar, Colorado, United States
- KLMR-FM, a radio station (93.5 FM) formerly licensed to Lamar, Colorado
