= Escárcega Municipality =

Municipality in the Mexican state of Campeche

Escárcega
- Municipality
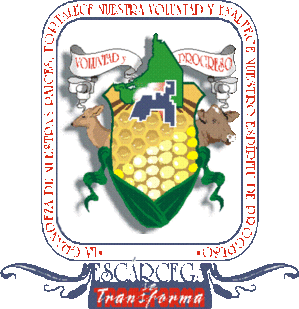
- Coat of arms

- Country: Mexico
- State: Campeche
- Municipal seat: Escárcega

Government
  - Municipal president: Aureliano Quirarte Rodríguez (2006-09)

Area
  - Total: 4,733.87 km^{2} (1,827.76 sq mi)
- Elevation: 60 m (200 ft)

Population (2015)
  - Total: 58,553
  - Density: 12.369/km^{2} (32.035/sq mi)
- municipality
- Time zone: UTC−6 (CST)
- Created: 1 January 1991
- Website: www.escarcega.gob.mx

Escárcega is one of the 13 municipalities in the Mexican state of Campeche. The municipal seat, and largest settlement, is the city of Escárcega.

== Geography ==
The municipality of Escárcega borders to the north with the municipality of Champotón, to the east with the municipality of Calakmul, to the south with the municipality of Candelaria, and to the west with the municipality of Carmen.

It covers 4,569.64 km^{2}, accounting for 8.0% of the state's total surface area.

== History ==
The municipality was created on 1 January 1991. It took its name from its municipal seat, which was in turn named for Tlaxcalan railwayman Francisco Escárcega, who built the Ferrocarril del Sureste that runs from Coatzacoalcos, Ver., to Campeche, Camp.

== Demographics ==
As of 2010, the municipality had a total population of 54,184.

As of 2010, the city of Escárcega had a population of 29,477. Other than the city of Escárcega, the municipality had 539 localities, the largest of which (with 2010 populations in parentheses) were: División del Norte (3,259), classified as urban, and La Libertad (1,462), Matamoros (1,453), Haro (1,092), Don Samuel (1,081), and Altamira de Zináparo (1,040), classified as rural.

== Transportation ==
Escárcega territory is a major hub of both roads and railways with these being the main driver of development in the region. Before their existence Escárcega was virtually depopulated.

=== Roads ===
The main roads connecting the municipality of Escárcega are Federal Highway 186 and Federal Highway 254. The Federal Highway 186 is the primary means of transportation and economic activity in the territory. The Federal Highway 254 is a small road that connects to 186.

=== Railways ===
Centenario

General information
- Location: Centenario, Campeche; Mexico
- Coordinates: 18°39′20.1″N 90°17′11.6″W"N

History
- Opened: December 15, 2024

Services
Preceding station	Tren Maya	Following station
Escárcega toward Cancún Airport	Tren Maya	Calakmul toward Cancún Airport
Candelaria toward Palenque	Tren Maya	Calakmul toward Cancún Airport
Location

The introduction of the railroad in the mid-1930s was the real engine of development in the state of Campeche where the present day municipality of Escárcega lies. The railway connected the Yucatán Peninsula with the rest of the country for the first time in the Mexico's history. The railway passes through the municipality of Escárcega southwest to northeast with the main station in the municipalities seat, Escárcega. To the north it connects with the city of Campeche and then Mérida, and southward with Tenosique, Tabasco. The total length of railways in the municipality is 6769 km.

Currently, Escárcega is home to the Escárcega railway station, which is served by the Tren Maya.

In addition, the Centenario municipality is also served by the Tren Maya at Centenario railway station, which opened on December 15, 2024.

=== Airports ===
There are three airports within the municipality that serve the public which are located in Escárcega, Don Samuel, and Pancho Villa.
