= Werf =

Werf or WERF may refer to:

- Werf, a name for an artificial dwelling hill
- WERF-LP, a low-power radio station (105.7 FM) licensed to serve Gainesville, Florida, United States
- De Werf, a Belgian record label
