= KFXV =

KFXV may refer to:

- KFXV (TV), a television station (channel 16, virtual 60) licensed to serve Harlingen, Texas, United States
- KMBH-LD, a television station (channel 67) licensed to serve McAllen, Texas, United States, which held the call sign KMBH-LD from 2012 to 2020
- KBGB, a radio station (105.7 FM) licensed to serve Kensett, Arkansas, United States, which held the call sign KFXV from 2007 to 2011
