= WAGL =

WAGL may refer to:

- WAGL, the United States Navy and United States Coast Guard hull classification symbol for a lighthouse tender subordinated to the Coast Guard
- WCOR-FM, a radio station (96.7 FM) licensed to serve Lewis Run, Pennsylvania, United States, which held the call sign WAGL from 2019 to 2020
- WCOP (FM), a radio station (103.9 FM) licensed to serve Eldred, Pennsylvania, which held the call sign WAGL from 2017 to 2019
- WAGL (South Carolina), a defunct radio station (1560 AM) formerly licensed to serve Lancaster, South Carolina, United States
