= Triunfo =

Triunfo may refer to:

== Places ==
Brazil

- Triunfo, Paraíba – municipality in Paraíba
- Triunfo, Pernambuco – municipality in Pernambuco
- Triunfo, Rio Grande do Sul – municipality in Rio Grande do Sul
- Triunfo Potiguar – municipality in Rio Grande do Norte
- Barão do Triunfo – municipality in Rio Grande do Sul
- Novo Triunfo – municipality in Bahia
- São João do Triunfo – municipality in Paraná

United States

- Triunfo, California – defunct settlement now located near present-day Thousand Oaks, California

== Publications ==
- Triunfo (magazine), a magazine published in Spain

== See also ==
- El Triunfo (disambiguation)
