= Arenaza =

- Town
- Location within Buenos Aires Province Location within Argentina
- Coordinates: 34°59′6″S 61°46′27″W
- Country: Argentina
- Province: Buenos Aires
- Partidos: Lincoln
- Established: 19 March 1904

Area
  - Total: 834 km^{2} (322 sq mi)
- Elevation: 92 m (302 ft)

Population (2001 Census)
  - Total: 1,311
  - Density: 1.57/km^{2} (4.07/sq mi)
- Time zone: UTC−3 (ART)
- CPA Base: B 6075
- Climate: Dfc

Arenaza is a town located in the Lincoln Partido in the province of Buenos Aires, Argentina.

== Geography ==
Arenaza is located 35 km (22 mi) from the regional center of Lincoln, and 350 km (220 mi) from the city of Buenos Aires.

== History ==
The farmland around Arenaza was purchased by Manuel Solana from a pair of Basques in 1880. In 1892, Solana sold the land to Carmelo and Jose María Arenaza. In 1903, a railway station named "Los Altos" was established by the Buenos Aires Western Railway in what would become the town after the land for it was sold by José María. Arenaza was founded a year later on March 19, 1904. In 1906, the railway station, and thus the town, were renamed to Arenaza. A brand of cream cheese, known as the Mendicrim, was created in Arenaza by engineer Osvaldo Mendizábal.

In honor of Arenaza's 100th anniversary in 2004, residents of the town painted their houses pink, green and yellow as part of an event organized by plastic artist Teresa Pereda. The project had begun in 2003, a year before the town's centenary, initially only involving a group of eight families. Paint for the project was donated by two agricultural companies. The town's railway station, then used as a library, was deemed by a jury of artists to have been the best painted building in the town. In total, 4,587 L (1,009 imp gal; 1,212 U.S. gal) of paint were used in the project, and 392 buildings in the town were painted. The stated goal of the project was to encourage the preservation of the town's older buildings.

The town's economy is largely reliant on the dairy industry alongside general agriculture. In 2025, a large dairy plant in the town, owned by Alimentos Refrigerados SA (ARSA), closed after a 30-day suspension in operations, which affected around 200 employees in Arenaza.

== Population ==
According to INDEC, which collects population data for the country, the town had a population of 1,311 people as of the 2001 census.
