= XHAC-FM =

As a result of the AM-FM migration in Mexico, two radio stations currently bear the XHAC-FM callsign:

- XHAC-FM, 106.9 FM "Radio Formula 106.9" in Aguascalientes, Aguascalientes
- XHAC-FM, 102.7 FM "Ke Buena" in Campeche, Campeche
