= KTYV =

KTYV may refer to:

- KTYV (FM), a radio station (105.7 FM) licensed to serve Steamboat Springs, Colorado, United States
- KKSB, a radio station (1230 AM) licensed to serve Steamboat Springs, Colorado, which held the call sign KTYV in 2018
- KCOQ (FM), a radio station (98.9 FM) licensed to serve Steamboat Springs, Colorado, which held the call sign KTYV from 2012 to 2018
