= XEA =

XEA may refer to:

- XHAC-FM, formerly XEA-AM, a radio station in Campeche, Campeche, Mexico
- Pacific Central Station, a railway station in Vancouver, British Columbia, which has XEA as its IATA railway station code
