= 1070 AM =

AM radio frequency

The following radio stations broadcast on AM frequency 1070 kHz: The Federal Communications Commission classifies 1070 AM as a United States clear-channel frequency. KNX in Los Angeles is the dominant class A station on 1070 kHz. CBA in Moncton, New Brunswick, is a former Canadian clear-channel station, which shared Class A status on this frequency. But on April 7, 2008, CBA moved to the FM dial.

== In Argentina ==
- LR1 El Mundo in Buenos Aires

== In Canada ==
Call sign	City of license	Daytime power (kW)	Nighttime power (kW)	Transmitter coordinates
CFAX	Victoria, British Columbia	10	10	48.396944°N 123.306944°W
CHOK	Sarnia, Ontario	10	10	42.891667°N 82.322222°W

== In Mexico ==
- XEIT-AM in Cd. del Carmen, Campeche

== In the United States ==
Stations in bold are clear-channel stations.

Call sign	City of license	Facility ID	Class	Daytime power (kW)	Nighttime power (kW)	Critical hours power (kW)	Unlimited power (kW)	Transmitter coordinates
KATQ	Plentywood, Montana	54639	D	5	0.05			48.766944°N 104.545278°W
KBCL	Bossier City, Louisiana	55968	D	0.25				32.537222°N 93.724444°W
KFKB	Wichita, Kansas	72356	B	10	1			37.761389°N 97.333056°W
KHMO	Hannibal, Missouri	5205	B	5	1			39.629444°N 91.375833°W
KILR	Estherville, Iowa	29726	D	0.25	0.048			43.429167°N 94.823056°W
KNTH	Houston, Texas	61174	B	10	5			29.9925°N 95.473056°W
**KNX**	Los Angeles, California	9616	A				50	33.859722°N 118.348889°W
KOPY	Alice, Texas	983	B	1	1			27.7775°N 98.081389°W
KSKK	Verndale, Minnesota	129640	B	5	5			46.395278°N 94.965°W (daytime); 46.395833°N 94.964444°W (nighttime)
KWEL	Midland, Texas	35879	D	2.5				31.962222°N 102.068611°W
WAPI	Birmingham, Alabama	16900	B	50	5			33.551944°N 86.911111°W
WBKW	Beckley, West Virginia	61276	D	10		7.7		37.755°N 81.236667°W
WCSZ	Sans Souci, South Carolina	25235	B	50	1.5			34.92°N 82.456944°W
WDIA	Memphis, Tennessee	69569	B	50	5			35.268056°N 90.0175°W
WEKT	Elkton, Kentucky	39460	D	0.5	0.018			36.809167°N 87.160556°W
WFLI	Lookout Mountain, Tennessee	72061	B	50	2.5			35.045°N 85.362222°W
WFNI	Indianapolis, Indiana	19521	B	50	10			39.955833°N 86.358333°W
WFRF	Tallahassee, Florida	70860	D	10				30.509444°N 84.335278°W
WGOS	High Point, North Carolina	56508	D	1				35.916111°N 80.016667°W
WINA	Charlottesville, Virginia	10649	B	5	5			38.088611°N 78.506389°W
WJMP	Plattsburgh, New York	27554	D	5				44.604167°N 73.455556°W
WKMB	Stirling, New Jersey	32985	D	0.25				40.676389°N 74.476667°W
WKOK	Sunbury, Pennsylvania	63889	B	10	1			40.881667°N 76.819722°W
WMIA	Arecibo, Puerto Rico	254	B	0.61	2.5			18.458889°N 66.755556°W
WNCT	Greenville, North Carolina	57841	D	5	0.013			35.602222°N 77.426389°W
WNVY	Cantonment, Florida	4130	D	15	0.028			30.579722°N 87.288333°W
WTSO	Madison, Wisconsin	41973	B	10	5			42.995833°N 89.316389°W
WWCD	Solana, Florida	35214	B	1.8	0.233			26.893611°N 82.050833°W
WZUN	Sandy Creek-Pulaski, New York	1046	D	2.5				43.605278°N 76.13°W
