= WCSZ =

Spanish-language contemporary hit radio station in Sans Souci, South Carolina

Coordinates: 34°55′12.4″N 82°27′24.4″W

- Sans Souci, South Carolina; United States
- Broadcast area: Upstate South Carolina
- Frequency: 1070 kHz
- Branding: La Jefa 94.9 FM & 1070 AM

Programming
- Language: Spanish
- Format: Contemporary hit radio & regional Mexican

Ownership
- Owner: Tama Broadcasting; (Redemptive Strategies Broadcasting, LLC)

History
- First air date: May 26, 1966
- Former call signs: WHYZ (1966–2000)

Technical information
- Licensing authority: FCC
- Class: B
- Power: 50,000 watts (day); 1,500 watts (night)
- Translators: 92.1 W221EK (Greenville); 94.9 W235BM (Mauldin)

Links
- Public license information: Public file; LMS
- Webcast: Listen live
- Website: lajefa949.com

WCSZ (1070 kHz, "La Jefa 94.9 FM & 1070 AM") is a commercial AM radio station licensed to Sans Souci, South Carolina, United States, and serving the Greenville–Spartanburg media market in Upstate South Carolina. WCSZ is owned by Tama Broadcasting and airs a Spanish contemporary hit radio format. The station is simulcast on FM translator W235BM at 94.9 MHz located on Paris Mountain in Travelers Rest and licensed to Mauldin, South Carolina. The station identifies itself as "La Jefa" which means "The Boss" in Spanish.

By day, WCSZ is licensed to broadcast at the maximum power allowed by the Federal Communications Commission (FCC), 50,000 watts non-directional. Because AM 1070 is a clear-channel frequency, reserved for Class A stations KNX in Los Angeles and a now-dark facility in Canada (formerly used by CBA in Moncton, New Brunswick), WCSZ must reduce power at night to 1500 watts using a directional antenna to avoid interference. The station's transmitter, a 3-tower antenna array, is off West Duncan Road (U.S. Route 25) in Greenville. WCSZ is one of 5 AM radio stations in South Carolina operating at 50,000 watts by day, the others being WESC in Greenville, WAGL in Lancaster, WBAJ in Blythewood, and WCEO in Columbia.

== History ==
On May 26, 1966, the station first signed on the air as WHYZ, licensed to Greenville, and operating as a daytimer. WHYZ in the 1960s and early 1970s featured a Top-40 format. WHYZ switched to an urban contemporary format in the late 1970s and 1980s. The station's main studios were destroyed by a fire in the late 1960s. The station has been broadcasting from a mobile home off of Highway 25 in Greenville ever since.

Around 2000, the station's city of license was moved to suburban Sans Souci and it was authorized to operate around the clock. Also in 2000, the station changed its call sign to WCSZ, and was purchased by Entercom Communications. WCSZ was eventually sold to Tama Broadcasting.

WCSZ was sports radio until the early 2000s, then urban contemporary gospel, and oldies, with the last two formats being entirely satellite-fed.

On July 19, 2007, the FCC issued a special temporary authority (STA) which is the process that allows a station to officially remain off the air for up to 6 months, at the end of which the station must have returned to the air or surrender its broadcasting license. The station applied for another STA in 2008. The justification for the STA was "to conserve assets while pursuing funding, the licensee respectfully requests authority to remain silent for 180 days". The application was filed in September 2008. In September 2009, the STA was denied; this meant the station, which had not operated on a regular basis since 2007, was forced to return to the air. Had the station not signed back on, it would have been forced to permanently remain dark.

In December 2009, the station's abandoned building was burglarized twice and many items were stolen, with the transmitter picked apart for parts. No arrest has been made in the burglaries.
