= Candelaria railway station =

Train station Campeche, Mexico

Candelaria

General information
- Location: Candelaria, Campeche, Mexico
- Coordinates: 18.18382°N 91.04629°W
- Platforms: 1
- Tracks: 2

Services
Preceding station	Tren Maya	Following station
El Triunfo toward Palenque	Tren Maya	Escárcega toward Cancún Airport
El Triunfo toward Palenque	Tren Maya	Centenario toward Cancún Airport

Candelaria is a future train station located in Candelaria, in the Mexican state of Campeche. Candelaria connects with Campeche and Yucatán.

== Tren Maya ==
Andrés Manuel López Obrador announced during his 2018 presidential candidate the Tren Maya project. On 13 August 2018, he announced the complete outline. The route of the new Tren Maya put Boca del Cerro on the route that would connect with Palenque, Chiapas and Escárcega, Campeche.

It will be located within a railway viaduct sometimes called the Viaduct of Candelaria (Spanish: Viaducto de Candelaria), built on lands owned by the Ferrocarril Transístmico. Passenger demand at this station will have a social nature, considering a 2-track, 1-platform scheme at the station.
