= Escárcega railway station =

Railway station in Campeche, Mexico

Escárcega

General information
- Location: Escárcega, Campeche, Mexico
- Coordinates: 18.61274°N 90.73135°W
- Platforms: 2
- Tracks: 3

History
- Opened: January 1, 2024

Services
| Preceding station | Tren Maya | Following station |
|---|---|---|
| Candelaria toward Palenque | Tren Maya | Carrillo Puerto Champotón toward Cancún Airport |

Escárcega is a train station located in the Mexican city of Escárcega, Campeche.

== Tren Maya ==
Andrés Manuel López Obrador announced during his 2018 presidential candidate the Tren Maya project. On 13 August 2018, he announced the complete outline. The route of the new Tren Maya put Escárcega on the route that would connect with Palenque railway station and Escárcega.

The station is located on land owned by the Ferrocarril Transístmico, next to a rice mill. Its demand will be of a social and logistical nature, it will have three tracks and two platforms.

== Characteristics of the station ==
The design of the station mixes a set of large sloping roofs of different shapes and sizes, porticoed areas, large overhangs and covered terraces.

The station will be single-level. The main accessway will be a covered and landscaped walkway that leads to a general lobby where technical areas, platforms, and public and commercial areas are connected.

Its finishes will be made of limestone and tropical wood. The limestone alludes to Mayan architecture, while the wood alludes to the logging camps that played a key role in the development of Escárcega.

The lattices will be made of rubber, a material that also played a key role in the history of Escárcega. A multimodal zone will be located on one side of the technical area, where bus, taxi, motorcycle and bicycle services will be provided.

The station will be surrounded by gardens and covered walkways. It is intended to be part of a new urban center with a park, centered on the station.
