= Roberts, Buenos Aires =

Roberts
- Town
- Location in Argentina
- Coordinates: 35°09′S 61°57′W
- Country: Argentina
- Province: Buenos Aires
- Partido: Lincoln
- Founded: 1916
- Elevation: 90 m (300 ft)

Population (2010 census [INDEC])
  - Total: 2,982
- CPA Base: B 6075

Roberts is a town in the Lincoln Partido of Buenos Aires Province, Argentina. It has two football teams, a police station, a fire station, a cultural center, a primary school, a secondary school, churches, an airfield, hotels, restaurants, and shops, among other amenities.

== Etymology ==
Roberts was named after John Roberts, who was the first manager of the Western Railway.

== History ==
In January 1903, the train station was inaugurated. A small town gradually formed around it, basing its economy on agricultural production. In the 1940s, the town experienced significant growth. Numerous businesses and industries flourished. The community had School No. 25, the José Ingenieros Library, and the Roberts Social Club; in addition, there were the Polo Club, the Roberts Athletic Club, the San Martín Social Club, and the Spanish, Cosmopolitan, and Italian mutual aid societies. In the lands surrounding Roberts, agricultural activity thrived, represented by grain producers, ranches, dairies, and pig farms.

It has been traditionally maintained that the founding date was 11 November 1916, the day the land that forms the basis of the town was auctioned off. However, according to reports from the public auctioneer Francisco Costa, it can be confirmed that this auction did not take place on 11 November 1916, but rather on 3 February 1918. The auction did not take place in the Hotel Argentino in Lincoln, but in Roberts itself, on the very same land being auctioned, with payment due in two years. In any case, setting aside the uncertainty regarding the date of the auction, it is not believed that this date should be considered the founding date. All towns and cities in the country use the date recorded in the founding document as their founding date, or at least, in the case of newer cities, the date of the decree approving their layout. However, it is unknown whether a founding document for Roberts ever existed or still exists, but the date of the decree is known, and it is known that this decree was approved on 26 May 1916. In other words, the founding date has been delayed by 168 days. It is believed that on 11 November 1916, only the land that would be divided into lots was marked out. The boundaries were marked, fences were erected, and the strips of plowed land would become the streets, all 20 meters wide, as specified in the plan. Nevertheless, the town of Roberts celebrates its anniversary on 11 November of each year, and this date has largely been ingrained in the local culture.

== Demographics ==
It had 2,982 inhabitants (according to the 2010 census), which represents an increase of 1.4% compared to the 2,939 inhabitants (INDEC, 2001) of the previous census.
