= XHEMI-FM =

Radio station in Cosoleacaque/Minatitlán, Veracruz

- Cosoleacaque, Veracruz; Mexico
- Broadcast area: Minatitlán
- Frequency: 105.7 MHz
- Branding: Latino 105.7

Programming
- Format: Spanish adult hits
- Affiliations: Radio S.A.

Ownership
- Owner: Grupo Radiorama; (Radiodifusora XEMI-AM, S.A. de C.V.)
- Operator: Organización Radiofónica Mexicana
- Sister stations: XHCSV-FM

History
- First air date: June 21, 1961 (concession)
- Call sign meaning: MInatitlán

Technical information
- Licensing authority: CRT
- Class: B1
- ERP: 25 kW
- HAAT: 31.26 m
- Transmitter coordinates: 17°59′10.21″N 94°32′40.47″W

XHEMI-FM is a radio station on 105.7 FM in Cosoleacaque, Veracruz, Mexico. It is affiliated with Radio S.A. carrying a Spanish adult hits format known as Latino 105.7 and is owned by Grupo Radiorama.

== History ==
Logo as La Poderosa, used from 2015 to 2021

XEMI-AM 1070 received its concession on June 21, 1961. It was owned by Eduardo Martínez Celís. For most of its history, it operated with 500 watts.

XEMI was cleared for AM-FM migration in 2010 with the call sign XHEMI-FM 105.7.
