= Judge Martinez =

Judge Martinez may refer to:

- Angela M. Martinez (born 1972), judge of the United States District Court for the District of Arizona
- Jose E. Martinez (born 1941), judge of the United States District Court for the Southern District of Florida
- Philip Ray Martinez (1957–2021), judge of the United States District Court for the Western District of Texas
- Ricardo S. Martinez (born 1951), judge of the United States District Court for the Western District of Washington
- William J. Martínez (born 1954), judge of the United States District Court for the District of Colorado

== See also ==
- Justice Martinez (disambiguation)
