= KLMR-FM =

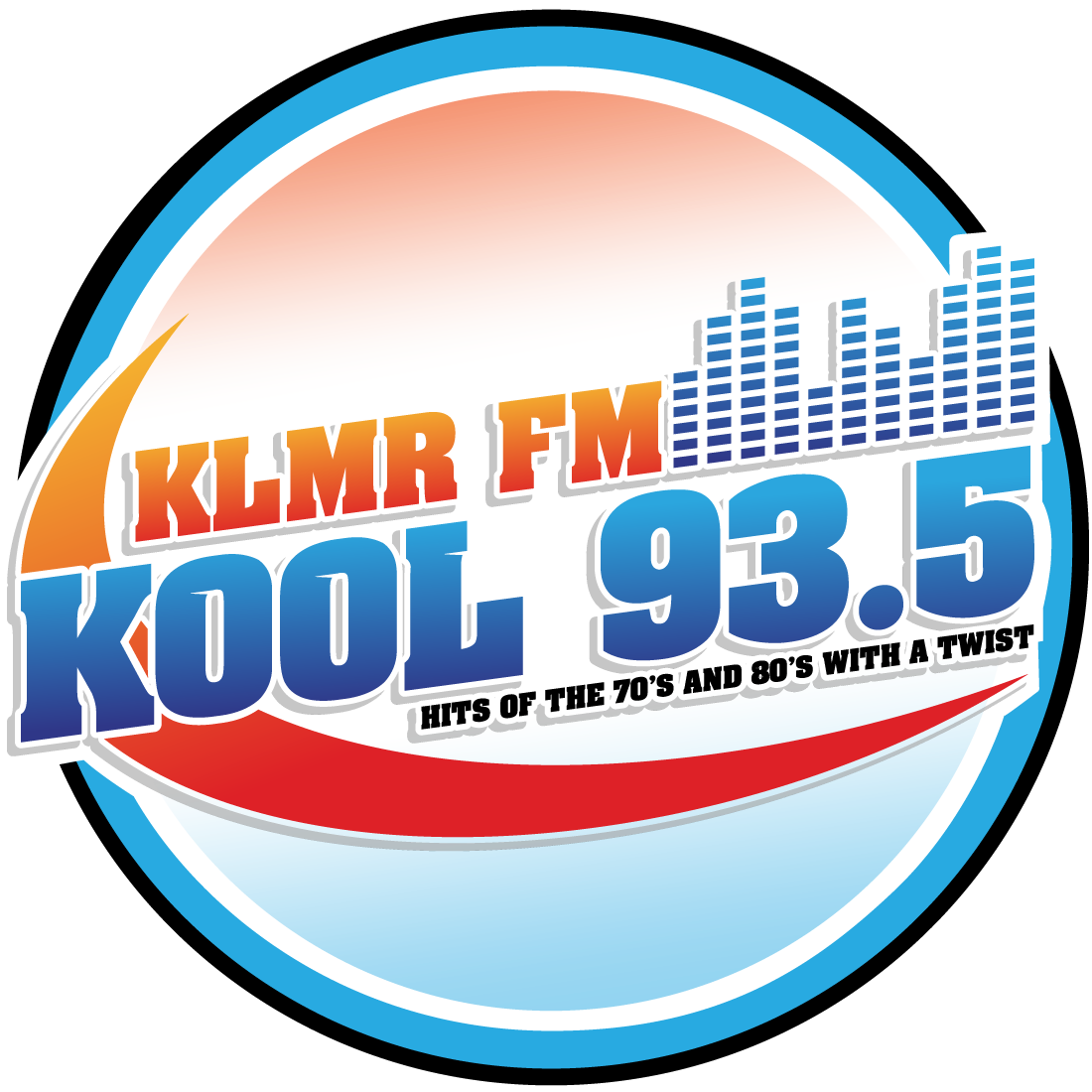
- Lamar, Colorado; United States
- Frequency: 93.5 MHz
- Branding: Kool 93.5

Programming
- Format: Classic hits
- Affiliations: Compass Media Networks; Premiere Networks

Ownership
- Owner: Kirk Crespin and Dale Willhite; (Riverside Communications, LLC)
- Sister stations: KLMR

History
- First air date: November 1978
- Former call signs: KLMR-FM (1976–1982); KSEC (1982–1999); KSNZ (1999–2004)
- Call sign meaning: "Lamar"

Technical information
- Licensing authority: FCC
- Facility ID: 175
- Class: C1
- ERP: 100,000 watts
- HAAT: 146 meters (479 ft)
- Transmitter coordinates: 38°2′10″N 102°35′58″W

Links
- Public license information: Public file; LMS
- Webcast: Listen Live
- Website: myklmr.com

KLMR-FM (93.5 MHz) is a radio station which broadcasts a classic hits format. The station is licensed to serve Lamar, Colorado, United States. KLMR-FM is owned by Kirk Crespin and Dale Willhite, through licensee Riverside Communications, LLC.

== History ==
The original construction permit for the station was issued to KLMR, Inc. on August 4, 1976, and issued the KLMR-FM call sign on October 26, 1976. The station signed on in November 1978 and was licensed on March 12, 1979. On October 25, 1982, the station changed its call sign to KSEC, on November 17, 1999, to KSNZ, and on May 26, 2004, back to KLMR-FM.

On June 11, 2018, KLMR-FM changed its format from classic rock to hot adult contemporary, branded as "93.5 The Heat".

The station's studios, co-located with the transmitter for its AM sister station, were destroyed in a microburst on July 23, 2022. While KLMR-FM would resume operations from makeshift facilities in the conference room of KVAY, described by the stations' chief engineer Kit Haskins as an "engineering nightmare", 25/7 Media subsequently elected to shut the station down on September 20, 2022, and surrender the KLMR-FM and KLMR licenses; the closure left KVAY, whose owner Bob DeLancey had a 33 percent interest in 25/7 Media, as the only commercial FM station in Lamar. That October, the KLMR licenses were reinstated, with 25/7 Media instead requesting special temporary authority to keep the two stations silent for financial reasons. On January 2, 2023, it was announced that Riverside Communications, LLC had purchased KLMR 920 and KLMR-FM from 25/7 Media for $30,000; the purchase was consummated on March 1. Riverside planned to rebuild and return the stations to operational status, with a tentative launch date of early 2023. Testing and tuning of the KLMR-FM signal began on May 8, 2023, with the official relaunch with a classic hits format scheduled for May 15, 2023.
