= XHPUGC-FM =

Radio station in Úrsulo Galván-Cardel, Veracruz, Mexico

- Úrsulo Galván-Cardel, Veracruz; Mexico
- Frequency: 105.7 MHz
- Branding: La Lupe

Programming
- Format: Variety hits

Ownership
- Owner: Multimedios Radio; (Multimedios Radio, S.A. de C.V.)

History
- First air date: May 4, 2018
- Former frequencies: 96.3 MHz (2018–2024)
- Call sign meaning: Úrsulo Galván/Cardel

Technical information
- Class: A
- ERP: 2 kW
- HAAT: 78.2 m
- Transmitter coordinates: 19°21′16.3″N 96°20′34.36″W

Links
- Webcast: Listen live
- Website: mmradio.com

XHPUGC-FM is a radio station on 105.7 FM in Úrsulo Galván-Cardel, Veracruz, Mexico. It is owned by Multimedios Radio and carries its La Lupe Spanish variety hits format.

== History ==
XHPUGC was awarded in the IFT-4 radio auction of 2017 and came to air May 4, 2018.

All three Multimedios stations in Veracruz flipped from La Caliente to La Lupe on November 6, 2020.

On June 7, 2023, the Federal Telecommunications Institute (IFT) approved XHPUGC-FM to move to 105.7 MHz, to avoid interference with XHRN-FM, which has a transmitter in the city of Veracruz. The frequency change was carried out on September 20, 2024.
