= El Triunfo railway station (1936) =

Defunct train station in El Triunfo, Tabasco

El Triunfo
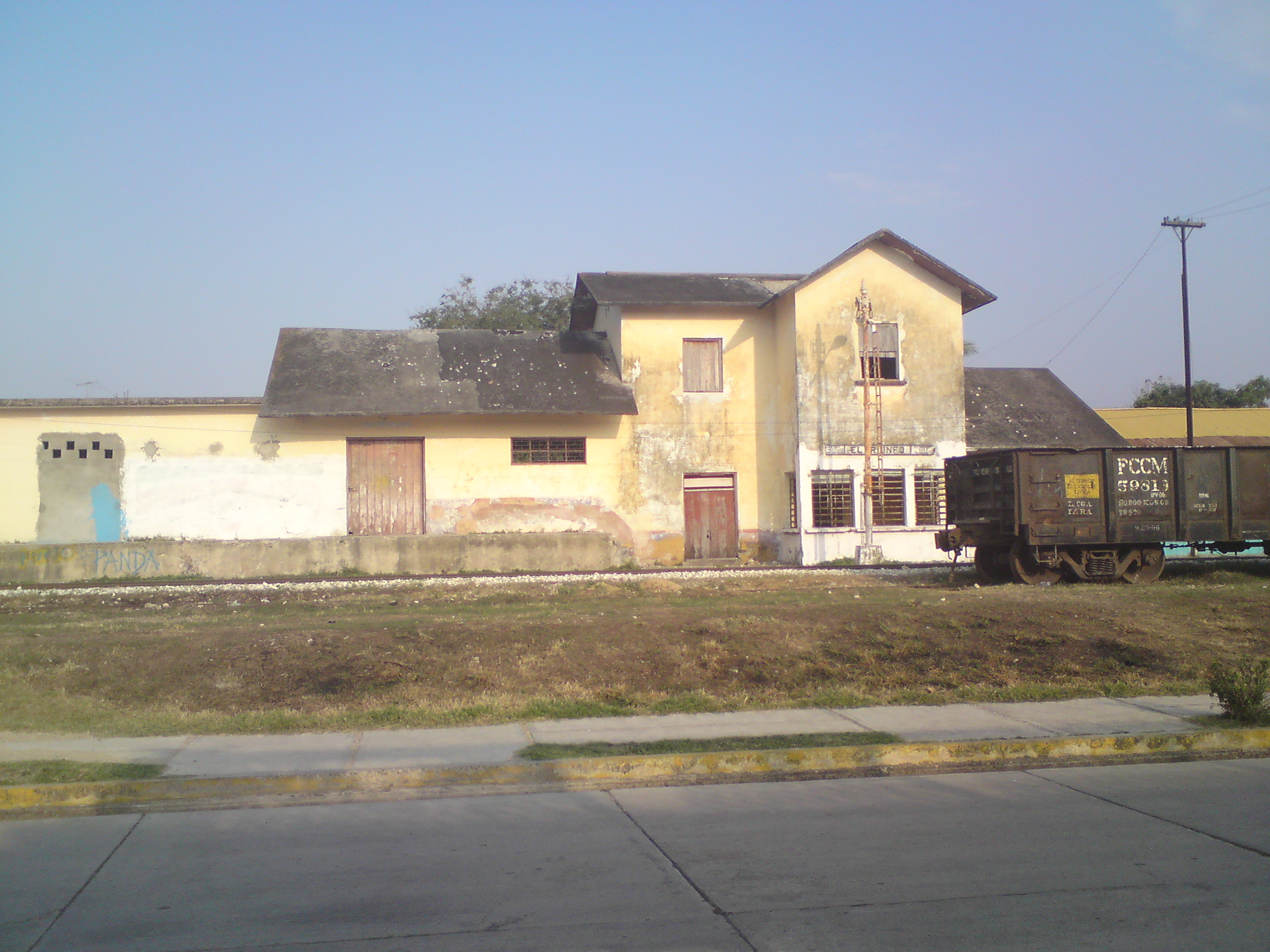
- The station in 2009

General information
- Location: El Triunfo, Tabasco, Mexico

History
- Opened: 1930s

Former services
| Preceding station | N de M | Following station |
|---|---|---|
| El Pozo toward Coatzacoalcos | Coatzacoalcos–Mérida Line | Paraíso toward Mérida |

El Triunfo was a train station located in El Triunfo, Tabasco. El Triunfo connected Tabasco with Campeche. It is currently abandoned.

The train station served trains from Mérida to Coatzacoalcos and from Yucatán to Veracruz, respectively.

== History ==
The station was built on the Coatzacoalcos–Merida Line. The Ferrocarriles Nacionales de México began planning the station's construction in July 1934.

Construction work began at the end of 1935 using the line located from Sarabia, on the Ferrocarril del Istmo de Tehuantepec. When the general study of the route was completed, the Sarabia junction was abandoned, adopting the Port of Coatzacoalcos as the western terminal of the Southeastern Railway.

== See also ==
- El Triunfo railway station, a Tren Maya station in the same town
