= XHLJ-FM =

Radio station in Lagos de Moreno, Jalisco, serving León, Guanajuato

- Lagos de Moreno, Jalisco; Mexico
- Broadcast area: León, Guanajuato
- Frequency: 105.7 MHz
- Branding: La Ke Buena

Programming
- Format: Regional Mexican
- Affiliations: Radiópolis

Ownership
- Owner: Radio Emisora Central, S.A. de C.V.

History
- First air date: March 30, 1963
- Call sign meaning: Lagos de Moreno Jalisco

Technical information
- Licensing authority: CRT
- Class: B1
- ERP: 15 kW
- HAAT: 109.3 meters (359 ft)
- Transmitter coordinates: 21°17′29″N 101°51′14″W

Links
- Webcast: Listen live
- Website: kebuenaradio.com.mx

XHLJ-FM is a radio station on 105.7 FM in Lagos de Moreno, Jalisco, also serving León, Guanajuato. It is owned by Radio Emisora Central and carries the national La Ke Buena Regional Mexican format from Radiópolis.

== History ==
XELJ-AM 1030 received its concession on July 1, 1963 after signing on March 30 of the same year. It was owned by Radio Anunciadora de Lagos, S.A. The 250-watt daytimer increased its power to 1,000 watts by the 1980s, and in the 1990s, it drastically jumped to 20 kW day and 2 kW night. In 2008, the concessionaire changed to Radio Emisora Central, which is owned by Carlos Sánchez Silva and Luz del Carmen Córdova Villalobos.

It was authorized to migrate to FM in 2011. A power increase to 15 kW was authorized in 2018.
