= KWEL =

Radio station in Midland, Texas

- Midland, Texas; United States
- Broadcast area: Midland–Odessa
- Frequency: 1070 kHz
- Branding: KWEL AM 1070 FM 107.1

Programming
- Format: News/talk
- Affiliations: Salem Radio Network; Townhall News; Westwood One

Ownership
- Owner: CDA Broadcasting, Inc.

History
- First air date: April 23, 1981

Technical information
- Licensing authority: FCC
- Facility ID: 35879
- Class: D
- Power: 2,500 watts day
- Transmitter coordinates: 31°57′44″N 102°04′7″W
- Translator: 107.1 K296FG (Midland)

Links
- Public license information: Public file; LMS
- Webcast: Listen Live
- Website: kwel.com

KWEL (1070 AM) is a radio station serving the Midland-Odessa area with a news/talk format. The station airs a serving of local programs and programs provided by Salem Radio Network and Westwood One. The station is currently under ownership of CDA Broadcasting, Inc. KWEL's AM frequency does not air at night. It airs every day from 6am- 8 pm. The FM frequency airs 24-hours a day and is the frequency found on the internet stream.

1070 AM is a United States and Canadian clear-channel frequency, on which KNX in Los Angeles is the only Class A station. However, a Class A license is available in Canada; CBA was a Class A station in Canada but moved to FM. KWEL must leave the air during nighttime hours to protect the skywave signal of KNX.

== Station schedule ==
Monday–Friday

- 6am – The Morning Show with Craig & Lisa
- 10am – Mike Gallagher Show Mike Gallagher (political commentator)
- 1pm – Eric Metaxas
- 2pm – The Sean Hannity Show
- 5pm – Mark Levin
- 8pm – Sebastian Gorka
- 11pm - Hugh Hewitt
- 2am - Larry Elder

Saturdays

- 6am - Music with Dorilynn
- 10am - Hoyl Financial Hour
- 11am- Doctor Bob Martin
- 2pm - Body Talk with Dr. Bill Dodson
- 3pm - Jacki Daily Show
- 4pm – The Sean Hannity Show
- 7pm – The Spirit of Radio Show

Sundays

- 7am - Texas Scorecard / EmpowerTexans / Michael Quinn Sullivan
- 7:30am - Lutheran Hour and Family Shield, sponsored by Grace Lutheran and Holy Cross Lutheran
- 8:30am - Family Gospel Music Hour, sponsored by Warren Bell
- 9:30am - Texas Scorecard
- 10am - Save the Cowboy, Sponsored by Western LLC
- 10:30am - Kelview Heights Baptist Church
- 11am - Lifestyles Unlimited
- Noon - Wall Builders
- 12:30pm - Christian Tabernacle Church with Roy Langley
- 1pm - The Intersection with Larry Long
- 2pm - Tom Gresham's Gun Talk
- 5pm – Larry Elder
- 7pm - Armed American Radio
