= XHOS-FM =

Radio station in Ciudad Obregón, Sonora, Mexico

- Ciudad Obregón, Sonora; Mexico
- Frequency: 105.7 FM
- Branding: La Unika

Programming
- Format: Pop in Spanish

Ownership
- Owner: Radio Grupo García de León; (Organización Sonora, S.A. de C.V.)

History
- First air date: July 26, 1956 (concession)

Technical information
- Licensing authority: CRT
- Class: B1
- ERP: 25 kW
- HAAT: 51.5 m (169 ft)
- Transmitter coordinates: 27°29′32″N 109°56′05″W

XHOS-FM is a radio station on 105.7 FM in Ciudad Obregón, Sonora. It is owned by Radio Grupo García de León and is known as La Uni-K with a Pop in Spanish format.

== History ==
XEOS-AM 1340 received its concession on July 26, 1956. It was owned by María Elena Corral de Millán and broadcast with 250 watts. In 1972, Sistema Radiofónico de Obregón bought XEOS; it was transferred to Sistemas Publicitarios y de Mercadotecnia de Obregón in 1992, and two years later, to Organización Sonora.

In April 2012, XEOS was cleared to move to FM as XHOS-FM 105.7.
