= WKMB =

Radio station in Stirling, New Jersey

- Stirling, New Jersey; United States
- Broadcast area: Middlesex
- Frequency: 1070 kHz
- Branding: Harvest Radio

Programming
- Format: Gospel music

Ownership
- Owner: World Harvest Communications, Inc.

History
- First air date: February 1972; 54 years ago
- Call sign meaning: K&M Broadcasters (original owner)

Technical information
- Licensing authority: FCC
- Facility ID: 32985
- Class: D
- Power: 250 watts (day)
- Transmitter coordinates: 40°40′35″N 74°28′36″W
- Translator: 100.7 W264BT (Edison)

Links
- Public license information: Public file; LMS
- Website: Harvest Radio Website

WKMB (1070 AM) is a radio station broadcasting an Urban Gospel radio format. Licensed to Stirling, New Jersey, United States, the station serves parts of Middlesex County, Morris County, Somerset County and Union County. The station is owned by World Harvest Communications, Inc.

WKMB is a daytimer. AM 1070 is a clear channel frequency reserved for KNX Los Angeles. That requires WKMB to sign-off at sunset to avoid interfering with this station and Class B WFNI in Indianapolis.

The station also broadcasts on simulcast translator W264BT on 100.7 FM in Edison, New Jersey.

== History ==
WKMB signed on in February 1972 with an adult contemporary format under the ownership of Herb Michaels. It changed to a country music format in 1979; in 2002, WKMB became the only commercial radio station in the New York City area to broadcast country music after a four-station simulcast on 107.1 FM dropped the format for Spanish-language programming. Following Michaels' death in 2002, his heirs sold the station to King's Temple Ministries, who converted WKMB to a gospel music station on January 19, 2003. King's Temple Ministries had earlier bought time on WERA before that station shut down in 1997. From 2003 until 2015, WKMB broadcast from WERA's former studios at 120 West 7th Street in Plainfield.

WKMB's license was canceled on June 14, 2017, for not paying debts it owed to the Federal Communications Commission (FCC), which prevented the renewal of the station's license. WKMB returned to the airwaves on July 1, 2017, from studios at 232 East Front Street in Plainfield, after having its license renewal application reinstated by the FCC on June 30.
