= Lincoln Partido =

Lincoln Partido de Lincoln
- Department
- location of in Buenos Aires Province
- Coordinates: 34°52′S 61°32′W
- Country: Argentina
- Established: 19 July 1865
- Named for: Abraham Lincoln
- Seat: Lincoln

Government
  - Intendant: Salvador Serenal (Civic Radical Union)

Area
  - Total: 2,253 km^{2} (870 sq mi)

Population
  - Total: 41,127
  - Density: 18.25/km^{2} (47.28/sq mi)
- Demonym: linqueño
- Postal Code: B6070
- IFAM: BUE071
- Area Code: 02355
- Website: http://www.lincoln.gov.ar/

The Partido de Lincoln is a partido of Buenos Aires Province in Argentina. It is located in the northwestern part of the province, in central Argentina.

As of the 2010 census, this provincial subdivision had a population of about 41,000 inhabitants in an area of 2,253 km^{2} (870 sq mi). Its administrative seat is Lincoln which is located 320 km (199 mi) from Buenos Aires.

== Settlements ==
- Arenaza
- Balsa
- Bayauca
- Bermúdez
- Carlos Salas
- Coronel Martínez de Hoz
- El Triunfo
- Fortín Vigilancia
- Las Toscas
- Lincoln
- Pasteur
- Roberts
- Triunvirato

== Name ==
When the partido was founded in 1865, the name Lincoln was chosen as a tribute to the recently assassinated Abraham Lincoln, 16th President of the United States (1861 to 1865), and enactor of the Emancipation Proclamation.

== Economy ==
Lincoln's main economy is agriculture, meat and dairy. The main crops are corn, soy, wheat and sunflower. The district is home to around 500,000 cows and responsible for 10% of Argentina's honey production.

== Sports ==
Lincoln Partido is home to a number of football clubs, including;

- Rivadavia
- El Linqueño
- Argentino de Lincoln
- Juventud Unida de Lincoln
- Atlético de Roberts
- San Martín de Roberts
- Deportivo de Arenaza
- CASET de El Triunfo
- Atlético Las Toscas
- Independiente de Martínez de Hoz
- Deportivo General Pinto
- Pintense de General Pinto
- Atlético de Pasteur.
- Club Atlético Bayauca.

== Folk festival ==
Pasteur in Lincoln Partido is home to one of Argentina's most important folk festivals, it takes place in February each year.
