= XHECH-FM =

Community radio station in Purépero, Michoacán, Mexico

Purépero, Michoacán; Mexico
- Frequency: 105.7 FM

Programming
- Format: Community/indigenous

Ownership
- Owner: Echais 88, A.C.

History
- First air date: May 18, 2015 (concession)
- Call sign meaning: ECHais 88

Technical information
- ERP: .3 kW
- HAAT: 52.3 meters
- Transmitter coordinates: 19°54′59.82″N 102°00′55.46″W

XHECH-FM is a community radio station in Purépero, Michoacán, Mexico broadcasting on 105.7 FM. It is owned by Echais 88, A.C.
