= El Triunfo, Buenos Aires =

El Triunfo
- Town
- Location within Buenos Aires Province
- Coordinates: 35°06′S 61°31′W
- Country: Argentina
- Province: Buenos Aires
- Partidos: Lincoln
- Established: 1909
- Elevation: 91 m (299 ft)

Population (2001 Census)
  - Total: 1,560
- Time zone: UTC−3 (ART)
- CPA Base: B 2355
- Climate: Dfc

El Triunfo is a town located in the Lincoln Partido in the province of Buenos Aires, Argentina. The town contains several restaurants, a library and a hotel.

== Geography ==
El Triunfo is located 25 km (16 mi) from the regional seat of Lincoln, and 346 km (215 mi) from the city of Buenos Aires.

== History ==
A warehouse was constructed in what would become the town in 1907. El Triunfo was primarily settled by immigrants of Italian origin in its early years. An immigrant monument was constructed in 1909, the year of the town's founding. The town has suffered from significant population decline as a result of an exodus to larger metropolitan areas. The town's train station is currently in use as a museum.

== Population ==
According to INDEC, which collects population data for the country, the town had a population of 1,560 people as of the 2001 census. In the 2010 census, its population had fallen slightly to 1,543 residents.
