= Martínez, Ávila =

Martínez
- municipality
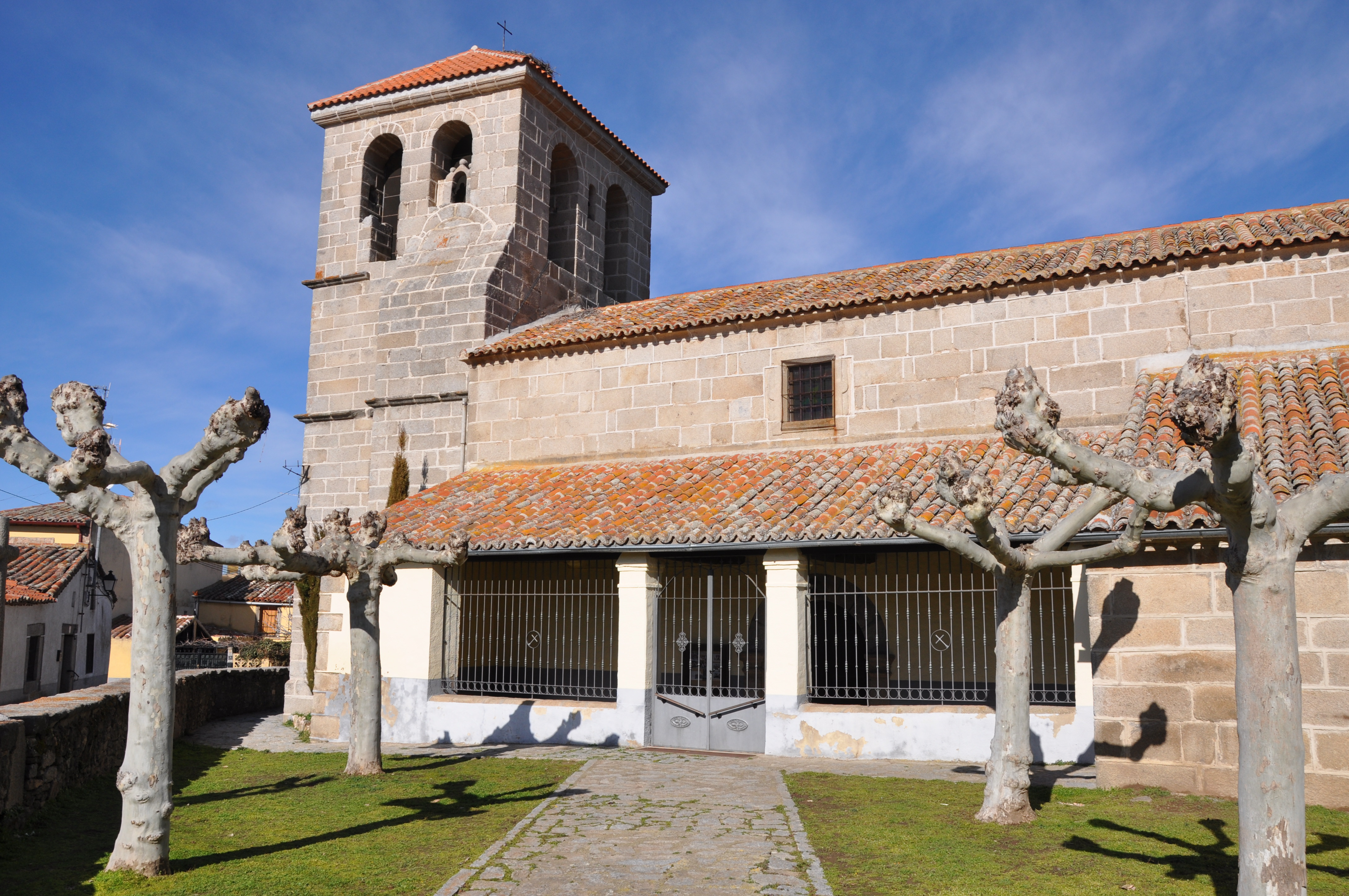
- Church of St. Thomas the Apostle
- Flag Coat of arms
- Location in Spain. Martínez (Spain)
- Coordinates: 40°37′51″N 5°20′54″W
- Country: Spain
- Autonomous community: Castile and León
- Province: Ávila
- Municipality: Martínez

Area
  - Total: 18 km^{2} (6.9 sq mi)
- Elevation: 1,098 m (3,602 ft)

Population (2025-01-01)
  - Total: 109
  - Density: 6.1/km^{2} (16/sq mi)
- Time zone: UTC+1 (CET)
  - Summer (DST): UTC+2 (CEST)
- Website: Official website

Martínez is a municipality in the province of Ávila, Castile and León, Spain.

It belongs in the judicial district of Piedrahita.

== Geography ==
It is located at an altitude of 1098 m and covers an area of 17.20 km². Located 70 km from the capital, bordering the province of Salamanca. Belongs to the judicial district of Piedrahita.

== Population ==
Historical population
Year	Pop.	±% p.a.
2023	114	—
2024	108	−5.26%
2025	109	+0.93%
Source: INE

== Government ==
Ignacio Sánchez Martín in mayor for the electoral period of 2023-2027.
