= WNVY =

Radio station in Cantonment–Pensacola, Florida

- Cantonment, Florida; United States
- Broadcast area: Pensacola, Florida
- Frequency: 1070 kHz
- Branding: Faith Radio 1070; Faith Radio 104.5

Programming
- Format: Christian

Ownership
- Owner: Pensacola Radio Corporation

History
- Former call signs: WJBW (1991–1993); WKGT (1993–1994)
- Call sign meaning: unknown, possibly a reference to the United States Navy, which has had a long association with the Pensacola area

Technical information
- Licensing authority: FCC
- Facility ID: 4130
- Class: D
- Power: 15,000 watts day 28 watts night
- Transmitter coordinates: 30°34′47.00″N 87°17′18.00″W
- Translator: 104.5 W283CU (Cantonment)

Links
- Public license information: Public file; LMS
- Webcast: WNVY 1070 Listen Live; WNVY 104.5 Listen Live
- Website: WNVY 1070 Online; WNVY 104.5 Online

WNVY (1070 AM) is a radio station broadcasting a Christian radio format. Licensed to Cantonment, Florida, United States, the station serves the Pensacola area. The station is currently owned by Pensacola Radio Corporation.

== History ==
The station was assigned the call letters WJBW on 1991-08-19. On 1993-04-21, the station changed its call sign to WKGT then on 1994-01-31 to the current WNVY. Played nostalgia and easy listening in 1993–1994, and home of the "Toast of the Coast" morning show.
