= XHRAC-FM =

Radio station in Campeche, Campeche

- Campeche, Campeche; Mexico
- Frequency: 97.3 MHz
- Branding: Radio Fórmula Campeche

Programming
- Format: News/talk
- Affiliations: Radio Fórmula

Ownership
- Owner: Núcleo Comunicación del Sureste; (Compañía Campechana de Radio, S.A.)
- Sister stations: XHMI-FM, XHAC-FM

History
- First air date: March 20, 1958 (concession)
- Former frequencies: 1430 AM

Technical information
- ERP: 25,000 watts (FM)
- Transmitter coordinates: 19°50′37″N 90°32′00″W

Links
- Webcast: XHRAC listen online
- Website: www.ncscampeche.com/radiochannel/radio-formula/

XHRAC-FM is a radio station in Campeche, Campeche, Mexico. It carries Radio Fórmula programming.

== History ==
In 1958, XERAC-AM 1430 received its concession. It retains the same concessionaire, though it migrated to FM in 2010.
