= El Triunfo railway station =

Train station in El Triunfo, Tabasco

El Triunfo

General information
- Location: El Triunfo, Tabasco, Mexico
- Coordinates: 17.9237°N 91.1711°W
- Platforms: 3
- Tracks: 2

Services
Preceding station	Tren Maya	Following station
Tenosique toward Palenque	Tren Maya	Candelaria toward Cancún Airport
Location

El Triunfo is a railroad station in El Triunfo, Tabasco. El Triunfo station connects Tabasco with Campeche.

== Tren Maya ==
Andrés Manuel López Obrador announced during his 2018 presidential candidate the Tren Maya project. On 13 August 2018, he announced the complete outline. The route of the new Tren Maya put Boca del Cerro on the route that would connect with Palenque, Chiapas and Escárcega, Campeche.

It will be located next to an old train station, formerly used by the Ferrocarril Transístmico. Passenger demand at this station will have a social nature, considering a 3-track and 2-platform scheme at the station.

== Characteristics of the station ==
The project takes up traditional tropical architecture with sloping roofs, porticos and large overhangs. The station will have a common lobby. On one side of the lobby, there will be the technical area; and on the other side, the passenger area will be there. There are also parking areas, walkways and gardens.

The outdoor areas will have access ramps and slopes covered with vegetation, evoking Mayan architecture. The finishes would include materials from the region such as limestone, wood, and palm.
