= DYML =

Radio station in Roxas City, Philippines

Love Radio Roxas (DYML)

Roxas City; Philippines
- Broadcast area: Capiz, Parts of Aklan
- Frequency: 105.7 MHz
- Branding: 105.7 Love Radio

Programming
- Languages: Capiznon, Filipino
- Format: Contemporary MOR, OPM
- Network: Love Radio

Ownership
- Owner: MBC Media Group

History
- First air date: January 1, 2000
- Former names: Radyo Natin (January 1, 2000-February 8, 2004)
- Call sign meaning: Manuel Roxas

Technical information
- Licensing authority: NTC
- Class: C-D-E
- Power: 5,000 watts
- ERP: 10,500 watts

Links
- Webcast: Listen Live
- Website: Love Radio Roxas

DYML (105.7 FM), broadcasting as 105.7 Love Radio, is a radio station owned and operated by MBC Media Group. The station's studio and transmitter are located at the 3rd Floor, Ricleah Building, Hemingway St., San Miguel Village, Brgy. Tiza, Roxas City.

== History ==
The station was inaugurated on January 1, 2000 under the Radyo Natin network. During its existence, it was located near Bagong Lipunan Trade Center. It went off the air sometime 2004.

In February 2015, the station returned on air, this time as 105.7 Love Radio. In August 2015, after eight months, Love Radio emerged as the new No. 1 music station in the city per Kantar Media radio survey.
