= XHAC-FM (Campeche) =

Radio station in Campeche, Campeche, Mexico

- Campeche, Campeche; Mexico
- Frequency: 102.7 MHz
- Branding: La Ke Buena

Programming
- Format: Regional Mexican
- Affiliations: Radiópolis

Ownership
- Owner: Núcleo Comunicación del Sureste; (Radiorama del Sureste, S.A.)
- Sister stations: XHMI-FM, XHRAC-FM

History
- First air date: August 7, 1939
- Call sign meaning: Derived from former AM callsign XEA + Campeche

Technical information
- ERP: 25,000 watts (FM)
- HAAT: 26.38 meters
- Transmitter coordinates: 19°50′30″N 90°32′06″W

Links
- Webcast: Listen live
- Website: ncscampeche.com/radiochannel/ke-buena/

XHAC-FM is a radio station on 102.7 FM in Campeche, Campeche. The station is owned by Núcleo Comunicación del Sureste and carries La Ke Buena national Regional Mexican format from Radiópolis.

== History ==
XEA-AM was Campeche's first radio station and the only station in the state for 18 years. Its roots lay in an unlicensed station that operated for a time in 1938, but was temporarily shut down a month later because it lacked a concession. Given the public interest that the new station had excited, Luis A. Maury applied for a concession, and on August 7, 1939, XEA-AM on 1370 kilohertz took to the air with the final annual address of Governor Eduardo Mena Córdova. Its formal concession was issued eight days later. XEA initially operated only three hours a day, in the evening, and as electricity was scarce in the city of Campeche, few residents had radios. It was commonly known as "El Eco de las Murallas".

Alejandro Casanova Brito, known as "Lexo", joined the station as an early announcer. By 1942, Maury wanted out of the radio business and sold the station to Casanova, who obtained financing for the acquisition from Governor Héctor Pérez Martínez. Casanova repaid the governor with airtime, leading to the creation of La Hora Estatal, a government radio program similar to the modern opt-outs of La Hora Nacional. Sponsored programming arrived on the station, as did a restructuring of the broadcast day. Newscasts like "Vida Social Arceo" and "Cuestión de Minuto", modest radio novels, live remotes from popular dances and political gatherings, and the transmission of Piratas de Campeche baseball games in the Peninsular League were staples of XEA. Additionally, the provision of round-the-clock electricity to Campeche beginning in 1950 increased the popularity of local radio. The station produced a variety of locally recognized announcers and hosts.

It would not be until 1957 that the station had competition, as Manuel Araujo Echeverría set up Campeche's second station on 1430 kHz, XEUK-AM. Six years later, the station was sold to the Rivas-Arceo Corcuera consortium of Yucatán broadcaster Rafael Rivas Franco and local Alberto Arceo Corcuera, who rebranded it XERAC-AM. Additionally, XECAM-AM was built in 1961 by Rafael Cutberto Navarro.

In the late 1960s, now with local competition, XEA moved to a musical format and took the name Radio Variedades, with a wide variety of music in Spanish.

In 1980, Arceo Corcuera purchased XEA, making it the sister station to XERAC as well as XHMI-FM, the first FM station in the state. He quickly built a media empire, which also featured stations of XETH-AM in Palizada, XEESC-AM in Escárcega and XESE-AM in Champotón and the Tribuna newspaper. This became known as Núcleo Comunicación del Sureste. With the sale, XEA changed its format to tropical music. In 1985, XEA along with the Palizada and Escárcega stations secured an affiliation to Radiorama.

In 2008, XEA picked up La Ke Buena national Regional Mexican format. The station migrated to 102.7 MHz FM in 2011 and changed its callsign to XHAC-FM, making it one of two unrelated stations to bear the callsign along with a radio station in Aguascalientes.
