= XHPMEN-FM =

Radio station in Ciudad del Carmen, Campeche, Mexico

- Ciudad del Carmen, Campeche; Mexico
- Frequency: 93.9 FM
- Branding: Retro FM

Programming
- Format: Spanish classic hits

Ownership
- Owner: NRM Comunicaciones; (Edilberto Huesca Perrotín)
- Operator: Grupo Audiorama Comunicaciones
- Sister stations: XHPCDC-FM (owner), XHIT-FM, XHMAB-FM (operator)

History
- First air date: August 31, 2020
- Call sign meaning: Ciudad Del Carmen

Technical information
- Class: B1
- ERP: 25 kW
- HAAT: 55.8 m
- Transmitter coordinates: 18°39′54.7″N 91°45′29.35″W

Links
- Webcast: Listen live
- Website: audiorama.mx

XHPMEN-FM is a radio station on 93.9 FM in Ciudad del Carmen, Campeche, Mexico. It is owned by NRM Comunicaciones and operated by Grupo Audiorama Comunicaciones, known as Retro FM with a Spanish classic hits format.

== History ==
XHPMEN was awarded in the IFT-4 radio auction of 2017. NRM chairman Edilberto Huesca Perrotín paid 5.737 and 5.687 million pesos and came away with XHPMEN and XHPCDC-FM 92.3. The station signed on August 1, 2020, some six months after the transmitter began testing, taking on the Retro format that had aired on XHMAB-FM 101.3 prior to that station's lease to El Heraldo Radio but ended on March 1, 2022.
