= XHPCDC-FM =

Radio station in Ciudad del Carmen, Campeche, Mexico

- Ciudad del Carmen, Campeche; Mexico
- Frequency: 92.3 MHz
- Branding: Bandolera

Programming
- Format: Regional Mexican

Ownership
- Owner: NRM Comunicaciones; (Edilberto Huesca Perrotín)
- Sister stations: XHPMEN-FM

History
- First air date: August 31, 2020
- Call sign meaning: "Ciudad del Carmen"

Technical information
- Class: B1
- ERP: 25 kW
- HAAT: 55.8 m
- Transmitter coordinates: 18°39′54.7″N 91°45′29.35″W

Links
- Webcast: Listen live
- Website: audiorama.mx

XHPCDC-FM is a radio station on 92.3 FM in Ciudad del Carmen, Campeche. It is owned by NRM Comunicaciones and known as Bandolera, which offers a Regional Mexican format.

== History ==
XHPCDC was awarded in the IFT-4 radio auction of 2017. NRM chairman Edilberto Huesca Perrotín paid between $5.737 and $5.687 million pesos and came away with XHPCDC and XHPMEN-FM 93.9. The station officially signed on August 31, 2020, some six months after the transmitter began testing.
