= XHMI-FM =

Radio station in Campeche City, Campeche, Mexico

- Campeche, Campeche; Mexico
- Frequency: 100.3 FM
- Branding: Exa FM

Programming
- Format: Contemporary hit radio
- Affiliations: MVS Radio

Ownership
- Owner: Núcleo Comunicación del Sureste; (Radio Amiga, S.A.)
- Sister stations: XHRAC-FM, XHAC-FM

History
- First air date: July 25, 1978 (concession)

Technical information
- Class: B
- ERP: 40,000 watts
- Transmitter coordinates: 19°50′45″N 90°32′12″W

Links
- Webcast: Listen live
- Website: ncscampeche.com

XHMI-FM is a radio station in Campeche, Campeche, Mexico on 100.3 FM. It is affiliated with MVS Radio's Exa FM.
