= DWRQ =

Radyo Natin Iba (DWRQ)
- Iba; Philippines
- Broadcast area: Central Zambales
- Frequency: 105.7 MHz
- Branding: 105.7 Radyo Natin

Programming
- Language: Filipino
- Format: Community radio
- Network: Radyo Natin

Ownership
- Owner: MBC Media Group
- Operator: Zambales Mix FM Media Advertising System

History
- First air date: December 16, 1997

Technical information
- Licensing authority: NTC
- Power: 500 watts

Links
- Webcast: Listen Live

DWRQ (105.7 FM), broadcasting as 105.7 Radyo Natin, is a radio station owned by MBC Media Group and operated by Zambales Mix FM Media Advertising System. Its studio is located at the 3rd floor, Primer Building, Iba, Zambales.
