= KLMR (AM) =

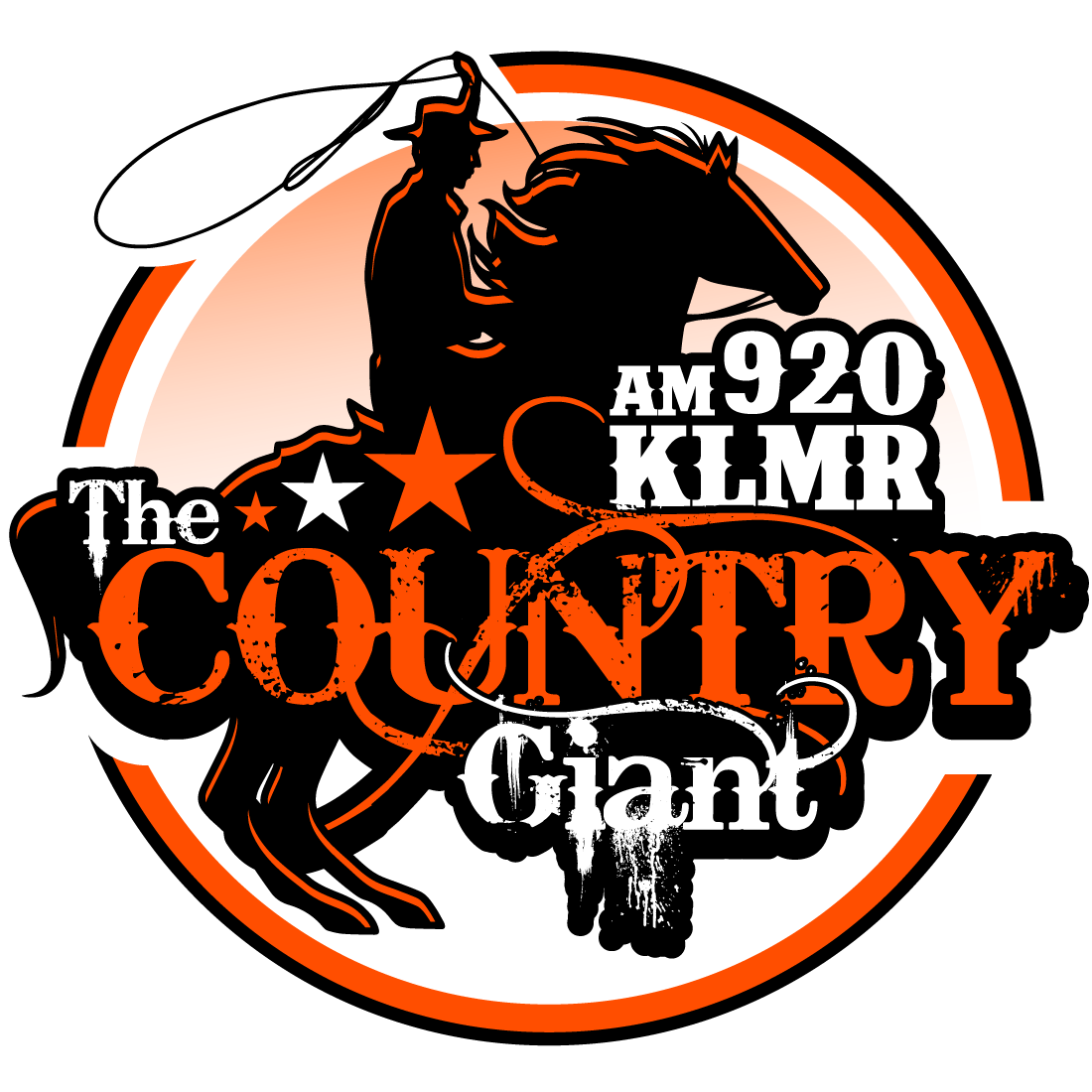

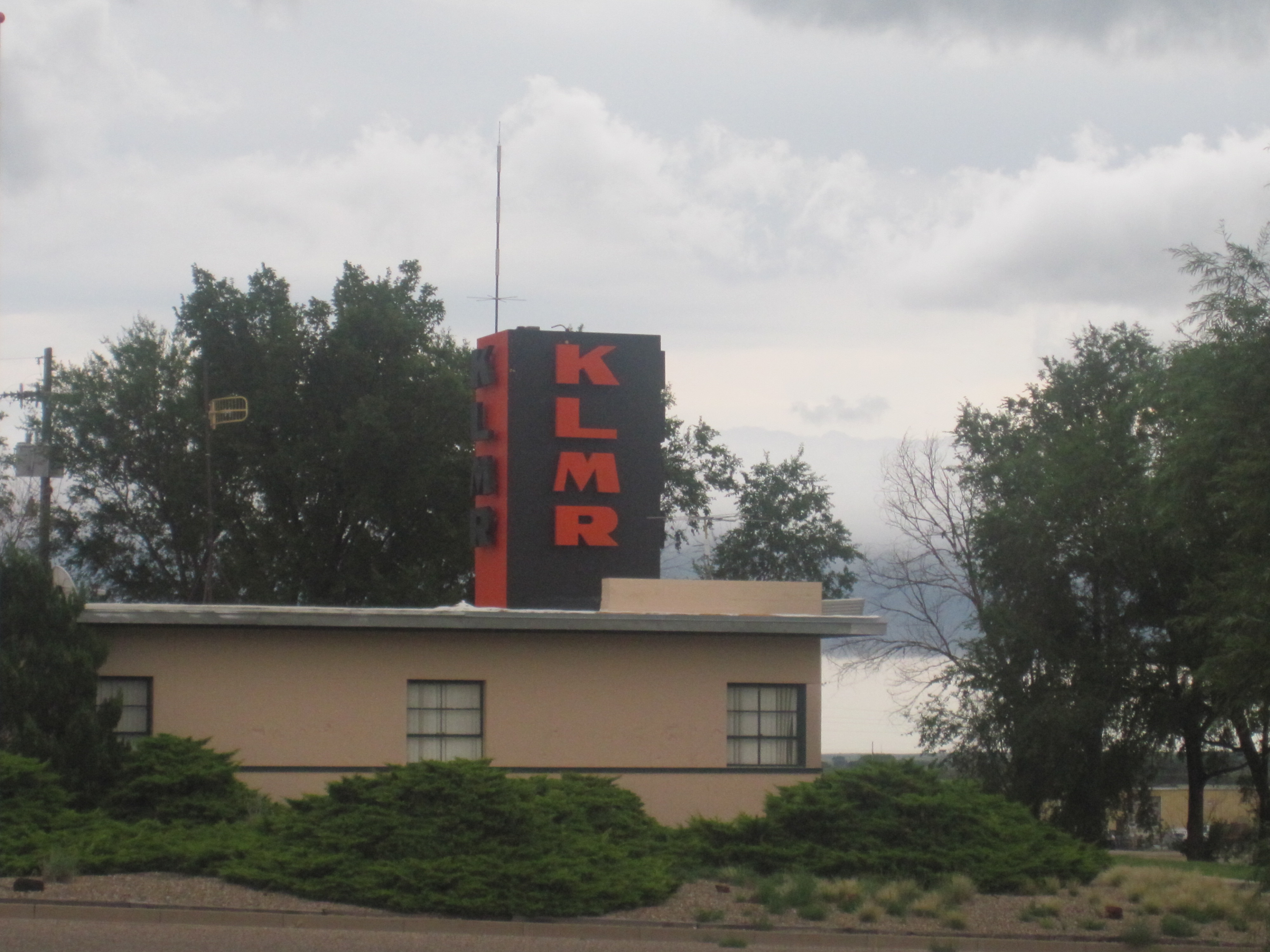
- KLMR in Lamar, Colorado
- Lamar, Colorado; United States
- Broadcast area: Lamar, Colorado
- Frequency: 920 kHz
- Branding: The Country Giant

Programming
- Format: Classic country
- Affiliations: NBC News Radio; Premiere Networks

Ownership
- Owner: Kirk Crespin and Dale Willhite; (Riverside Communications, LLC)
- Sister stations: KLMR-FM

History
- First air date: December 1948 (at 1340 kHz)
- Former frequencies: 1340 kHz (1948–1955)
- Call sign meaning: "Lamar"

Technical information
- Licensing authority: FCC
- Facility ID: 174
- Class: B
- Power: 5,000 watts day; 500 watts night
- Transmitter coordinates: 38°6′53″N 102°37′16″W

Links
- Public license information: Public file; LMS
- Webcast: Listen Live
- Website: myklmr.com

KLMR (920 kHz) is an AM radio station broadcasting a classic country format. Licensed to Lamar, Colorado, United States, the station is owned by Kirk Crespin and Dale Willhite, through licensee Riverside Communications, LLC.

The station signed on in December 1948. Originally operating at 1340 kHz, KLMR moved to 920 kHz in 1955.

On June 11, 2018, KLMR changed its format from classic country to news/talk/sports.

The station's studio and transmitter was destroyed by a microburst on July 23, 2022. 25/7 Media elected not to rebuild the station, and surrendered the licenses of KLMR and sister station KLMR-FM to the FCC on September 21, 2022. That October, the licenses were reinstated, with 25/7 Media instead requesting special temporary authority to keep the stations silent for financial reasons. On January 2, 2023, it was announced that 25/7 Media had sold KLMR and KLMR-FM to Riverside Communications, LLC for $30,000; the sale was consummated on March 1. Riverside planned to rebuild the stations and return them to operational status, with a tentative launch date of early 2023. Testing and tuning of the KLMR signal began on May 8, 2023, with official relaunch with a classic country format scheduled for May 15, 2023
