= Praise FM (Saint Vincent and the Grenadines) =

- Saint Vincent and the Grenadines
- Broadcast area: Saint Vincent and the Grenadines, St. Lucia, Grenada, Barbados
- Frequencies: 95.7 and 105.7 FM

Programming
- Format: Christian Radio

Ownership
- Owner: Streams of Power Church

History
- First air date: 1998

Links
- Webcast: http://video1.getstreamhosting.com:18158/stream
- Website: http://www.praisefmsvg.com/

Praise FM is a Christian radio station in Saint Vincent and the Grenadines, broadcasting on 95.7 and 105.7 MHz FM. Praise FM also has coverage into parts of neighboring islands including; St. Lucia, Grenada, and Barbados. The station was founded in 1998 by the Pastors of Streams of Power Church Errol and Carmalie Daniel.

Praise FM airs a variety of Christian programs including church services, Christian concerts, and other programs that are locally produced, as well syndicated programs such as Focus on the Family, In Touch with Charles Stanley, Unshackled!, and the Children's program Adventures in Odyssey. In addition to Christian programming, Praise FM also airs public educational briefs, news, and weather.
