= WTNI =

- Addison, Alabama; United States
- Broadcast area: Huntsville, Alabama
- Frequency: 105.7 MHz

Programming
- Format: Country; bluegrass

Ownership
- Owner: SSR Communications, Inc.; (SSR Communications, Inc.)

History
- First air date: 1996 (as WYAM-FM)
- Former call signs: WYAM-FM (1996–2001); WQAH (2001); WQAH-FM (2001–2026)

Technical information
- Licensing authority: FCC
- Facility ID: 48737
- Class: A
- ERP: 4,500 watts
- HAAT: 114.9 meters (377 ft)
- Transmitter coordinates: 34°18′19″N 87°4′24″W

Links
- Public license information: Public file; LMS

WTNI (105.7 FM) is a classic country, bluegrass, and gospel music-formatted radio station licensed to Addison, Alabama, that serves Decatur and the western portion of the Huntsville market. The station is owned by SSR Communications, Inc. WTNI's transmitter is located west of Battleground, Alabama.

== History ==
The station held the WQAH-FM call letters as assigned by the Federal Communications Commission from September 7, 2001 to September 27, 2026. Before being known as WQAH-FM, the station's call letters were WYAM-FM from October 25, 1996, to August 31, 2001. During the six-day gap between these call signs this station was simply WQAH until a co-owned AM station was flipped from WJRA to WQAH on September 7, 2001.

WTNI was sold to SSR Communications, Inc. on August 12, 2026.

== Personalities ==
Local personalities on the former WQAH-FM included Mark Donovan, J.T., and the retired Carol Lynn, recipient of the 2006 Alabama Country and Gospel Music Association Award for Radio Personality of the Year. Hannah Campbell, recipient of the 2020 Alabama Broadcasters Association Best in Broadcasting Small Market Reporter Award and the 2020 Alabama Broadcasters Association Best in Broadcasting Small Market Public Affairs Award, served as an on-air personality and delivered community calendar updates and traffic reports.
