= Coronel Martínez de Hoz =

- City
- Location in Argentina
- Coordinates: 35°19′S 61°37′W
- Country: Argentina
- Province: Buenos Aires
- Partido: Lincoln
- Founded: 1904
- Elevation: 82 m (269 ft)

Population (2010 census [INDEC])
  - Total: 1,041
- CPA Base: B 6533
- Area code: +54 2355

Coronel Martínez de Hoz is a city located in the partido of Lincoln in Buenos Aires Province, Argentina.

The settlement was established in 1904 and named in honour of Miguel Federico Martínez de Hoz an Argentine colonel during the Paraguayan War.
