= Jusmen 105.7 FM =

- Lagos; Nigeria
- Frequency: 105.7 MHz

Programming
- Format: Afrobeats, hip hop, rhythm and blues

Ownership
- Owner: Bliss Broadcasting Limited

History
- First air date: May 2024

Links
- Website: www.radiojusmen.com

Jusmen 105.7 FM, also referred to as Radio Jusmen, is a Nigerian radio station located in Lagos State. The station began broadcasting in May 2024 and is operated by Bliss Broadcasting Limited. The station broadcasts on 105.7 MHz FM and online, with a format focused on music, entertainment and lifestyle content. Its music programming includes Afrobeats, hip hop, and rhythm and blues (R&B), targeting listeners across Generation X, millennials and Generation Z.
