= XHIT-FM =

Radio station in Ciudad del Carmen, Campeche, Mexico

XHIT-FM / XEIT-AM
- Ciudad del Carmen, Campeche; Mexico
- Frequencies: 99.7 FM; 1070 AM
- Branding: Exa FM

Programming
- Format: Spanish & English Top 40 (CHR)
- Affiliations: MVS Radio

Ownership
- Owner: Boeta family and Grupo Radiorama; (Estéreo Carmen, S.A. de C.V.)
- Operator: Organización Radio Carmen
- Sister stations: XHMAB-FM, XHPMEN-FM

History
- First air date: January 27, 1962 (AM); 1994 (FM)
- Call sign meaning: Isla de Tris (first name of Isla del Carmen)

Technical information
- Class: B1 (FM); C (AM)
- Power: AM: 1 kW day/.25 kW night
- ERP: FM: 10 kW

Links
- Webcast: Listen live
- Website: exafm.com

XEIT-AM/XHIT-FM is an AM-FM combo radio station in Ciudad del Carmen, Campeche, Mexico, broadcasting on 1070 AM and 99.7 FM. It is operated by Organización Radio Carmen and carries the Exa FM pop format from MVS Radio. It is owned 50 percent by members of the Boeta family and 50% by Grupo Radiorama.

== History ==
XEIT came to air in January 1962 as the first radio station in Carmen. Mario Antonio Boeta Blanco, who would later start XEMAB-XHMAB radio and become mayor of the city in the mid-1970s, helped to establish XEIT; Boeta Blanco and other family members continue to own half of the station, with the remaining shares held by members of the founding families of Radiorama.

The station became an AM/FM combo in 1994, as part of the first wave of AM/FM combo stations in various regions of Mexico. The concession transferred from Radio Carmen, S. de R.L., to the current concessionaire in 2015.
