= Justice Martinez =

Justice Martinez may refer to:

- Alex J. Martinez (born 1951), associate justice of the Colorado Supreme Court
- Alicia Austria-Martinez (born 1940), associate justice of the Supreme Court of the Philippines
- Joe L. Martínez (c. 1909–1998), associate justice of the New Mexico Supreme Court
- Luis Estrella Martínez (born 1971), associate justice of the Supreme Court of Puerto Rico

== See also ==
- Judge Martinez (disambiguation)
