= Francisco Escárcega =

Francisco Escárcega Márquez (2 January 1896 – 22 July 1938) was a builder of railroads in Mexico and fought in the Mexican Revolution. He was born in Nanacamilpa, Tlaxcala, and opened up areas in southern and eastern Mexico with railways. In 1938, he was in an aircraft crash in Palenque, Chiapas, while conducting aerial surveillance for a new railway. He survived the crash but died later of his injuries in Villahermosa, Tabasco.

Following his death, the town of Escárcega in the state of Campeche – at the time, a railway camp known as Kilómetro 47 on the route from Coatzacoalcos to Campeche – was renamed in his honour.
