= XHMAB-FM =

Radio station in Ciudad del Carmen, Campeche, Mexico

XHMAB-FM / XEMAB-AM
- Ciudad del Carmen, Campeche; Mexico
- Frequencies: 101.3 MHz; 950 kHz
- Branding: Globo

Programming
- Format: Romantic
- Affiliations: MVS Radio

Ownership
- Owner: Radiorama; (XEMAB-AM, S.A. de C.V.)
- Operator: Organización Radio Carmen
- Sister stations: XHIT-FM

History
- First air date: 1980
- Call sign meaning: Mario Antonio Boeta Blanco (original concessionaire)

Technical information
- Class: B1
- ERP: 25 kW
- HAAT: 40.8 m
- Transmitter coordinates: 18°38′37″N 91°50′21″W

Links
- Webcast: Listen live
- Website: fmglobo.com

XHMAB-FM 101.3/XEMAB-AM 950 is a radio station in Ciudad del Carmen, Campeche, Mexico. XHMAB is currently operated by Organización Radio Carmen and carries an Globo format from MVS Radio.

== History ==
XEMAB-AM 950 was licensed to Mario Antonio Boeta Blanco in 1973 for operation with 250 watts of power and migrated to FM with an authorization in 2010. Boeta Blanco was mayor of Ciudad del Carmen from 1974 to 1976 and also had helped establish XEIT-AM, the first radio station in Carmen, in the 1960s.

In May 2017, XHMAB dropped its La Poderosa Regional Mexican format for Retro.

In August 2020, XHMAB changed its format to El Heraldo Radio. All Retro shows, including Centro Regional de Noticias, were moved to XHPMEN-FM, a new station being leased by Radiorama.

On March 1, 2022, the programming of El Heraldo Radio concluded, and announced the MVS Radio's FM Globo romantic format on June 28 part of new operator Organización Radio Carmen.
