= El Triunfo, Tabasco =

El Triunfo
- Interactive map of El Triunfo
- Location within Tabasco Location within Mexico
- Coordinates: 17°55′23″N 91°10′14″W
- Country: Mexico
- State: Tabasco
- Municipality: Balancán

Area
  - Land: 7 km^{2} (2.7 sq mi)
- Elevation: 51 m (167 ft)

Population (2010)
  - Total: 5,627
- Time zone: UTC-6 (Zona Centro)
- Postal code: 86950

El Triunfo is a town located in the Balancán Municipality in the state of Tabasco, Mexico. The town consists of less than a thousand households. El Triunfo was a largely isolated community until the construction of a rail station in 2024, which is expected to spur tourism to the city.

== Geography ==
El Triunfo is located approximately 220 km (140 mi) from the regional center of Villahermosa. It is also located 27 km (17 mi) from the Moral Reforma, a Maya archaeological site in eastern Tabasco.

== History ==
The first railway station in the town was built in 1935 by the Ferrocarril del Sueste, as part of a service between the cities of Mérida and Coatzacoalcos. The station was later demolished. The town was first called "El Triunfo" in 1942, as the town was an end point for several workers arriving from Veracruz. El Triunfo routinely suffers from limited electricity access, especially during the rainy season, and poor roads. The town also lacks a garbage collection center, leading to waste being left on the streets. Due to the town's insufficient infrastructure, El Triunfo saw little tourism prior to the construction of the community's second rail station.

As part of plans to improve rail service, a warehouse was constructed in El Triunfo to manufacture parts for the project. The construction of a second railway station in El Triunfo, as part of the greater Tren Maya project is expected to revitalize the community, allowing easier access to neighboring communities for work, with Mexican president Andrés Manuel López Obrador stating the station will "bring El Triunfo back to life". The addition of rail service has also facilitated an improvement in medical service to El Triunfo, as well as a projected increase in tourism. In 2025, Javier May Rodríguez, governor of Tabasco, began a program to make the town more appealing to tourism, which involved paving the town's streets and renovating El Triunfo's drainage system. The town is also expected to be included in the state's housing program, which plans to complete around 65,000 homes in the state of Tabasco. In total, around 10 million pesos were invested by the government into El Triunfo.

== Population ==
According to the 2010 census, El Triunfo had a population of 5,627 people.
