= WUZR =

Coordinates: 38°43′47″N 87°24′44″W

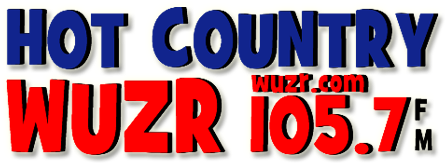
- Bicknell, Indiana; United States
- Broadcast area: Vincennes, Indiana
- Frequency: 105.7 MHz
- Branding: Hot Country

Programming
- Format: Country music

Ownership
- Owner: The Original Company, Inc.

Technical information
- Licensing authority: FCC
- Facility ID: 41004
- Class: A
- ERP: 1,800 watts
- HAAT: 130 meters (430 ft)

Links
- Public license information: Public file; LMS
- Website: wuzr.com

WUZR 105.7 FM is a radio station broadcasting a country music format. Licensed to Bicknell, Indiana. The station serves the Vincennes, Indiana area, and is owned by The Original Company, Inc.
