= El Triunfo, Michoacán =

Coordinates: 20.2381°N 101.9931°W

El Triunfo de San Miguel is a village located in the northern part of the Mexican state of Michoacán and belongs to the Municipality of Numaran, located approximately 20 km from La Piedad de Cavadas and 3.5 km from Numaran over a paved road.

The main economy of El Triunfo is derived from agriculture, livestock and small amounts of commerce. In 1995 the population was estimated to be 747 inhabitants. El Triunfo has a long history of sending migrant workers to the United States dating back to the Bracero Program. The population of El Triunfo tends to swell during the months of September and December when many of its citizens who live and work in United States return for the Fiesta De San Miguel.

It is believed that it was inhabited by Purepechas or Aztecs before the arrival of the Spaniards, because some ruins were found while the church building was being constructed. Among them, according to archaeologists depict Quetzacatl (the feathered serpent) an Aztec or Purepecha god

== History ==
It is believed that the inhabitants before the Spaniards arrived were either Purepechas or Aztecs. The reason for this belief is because during the construction of the new church some artifacts were found, among the items was a rock with what appears to be the symbol of Quetzacatl (the feathered serpent which is a god in both the Purepecha and Aztec cultures. The rock was found by Antonio Cabrera in 1988 as he was digging to make a well for drinking water.

The official name is El Triunfo de San Miguel. It is named after its patron saint San Miguel Arcangel. Before that it was known as La Fantasma (The Phantom). Legend has it that San Miguel freed the town of the phantom and on September 29, 1925 the day of the patron saint the name was officially changed to El Triunfo de San Miguel.

Every year many people descendants of San Miguel who now live in the United States or elsewhere return to San Miguel to participate in the annual Fiestas de San Miguel. The Fiestas de San Miguel is arguably one of the most anticipated celebrations in the region.

The Fiestas have had such notable performers such as Las Jilguerillas, Los Muecas, Los Cadetes de Linares and others. The performance by Las Jilguerillas was one of the most attended in the history of the Fiestas. El Triunfo has a population of about 800 but it is estimated that during the fiestas it swells to well over 2,000.
