= WAGL (South Carolina) =

- Lancaster, South Carolina; United States
- Frequency: 1560 kHz

Ownership
- Owner: B. L. "Len" Phillips Jr.; (Palmetto Broadcasting System, Inc.)

History
- First air date: August 7, 1962
- Last air date: November 2, 2014
- Call sign meaning: Weaving A Greater Lancaster

Technical information
- Facility ID: 51348
- Class: D
- Power: 50,000 watts (days only); 50,000 watts (critical hours)
- Transmitter coordinates: 34°49′53″N 80°52′8″W

WAGL (1560 AM) was a radio station licensed to Lancaster, South Carolina, United States, that operated from 1962 until 2014. Last owned by B. L. "Len" Phillips Jr., under the name Palmetto Broadcasting System, Inc., it featured an oldies format at the station's closure.

Because it shared the same frequency as "clear channel" station WFME in New York City, WAGL only operated during the daytime hours. Its transmitter site was located near the Catawba River, nearly 10 miles (16 km) from its studio site at 101 S. Woodland Drive.

== History ==
B. L. (Len) Phillips Jr. applied to the Federal Communications Commission (FCC) in March 1960 for a new AM radio station on 1560 kHz, to be located in Lancaster, South Carolina. A construction permit and subsequent license was issued by the FCC for a 1,000 watt, non-directional, single tower antenna system, and work began on the new station that same year.

WAGL officially signed-on to much local fanfare at 10:00 am on August 7, 1962. The ceremonies took place on the grounds of the local courthouse and the Mayor of Lancaster was given the honor of pushing the button to fire up the Gates BC-1 transmitter to begin broadcasting. Reflecting its textile town roots in Lancaster, WAGL stood for "Weaving A Greater Lancaster". At that time Lancaster was a major textile town for Springs Mills (later Springs Industries). At one time Springs Mills had the world's largest cotton mill under one roof located in Lancaster. This was reflected in the call letters of another local radio station that had signed on in 1951, WLCM, "World's Largest Cotton Mill".

Realizing the need to serve the broader Lancaster County area, Phillips applied to the FCC in May 1965 for a license to increase power to 10,000 watts daytime. This power increase would utilize a two-tower directional array using 150 foot (45 meter) ROHN-45 guided towers. The license was granted and, on March 15, 1967, WAGL officially increased its daytime operating power to 10,000 watts using a Gates BC-10 transmitter. By doing this, WAGL became one of the four most powerful radio stations in South Carolina at that time.

By 1976, WAGL was in its heyday, playing a Top-40/Rock format and topping the Charlotte, North Carolina Arbitron ratings consistently. In April 1976, another application was made to the FCC for an increase in power to 50,000 watts daytime, the maximum power allowed by the FCC for AM stations. A license was granted and a new transmitter site was constructed on 15 acres (6 hectares) of land between Lancaster and Rock Hill, South Carolina, near the Catawba River. This again was a directional antenna system, now employing a four-tower array using 170 foot (52 meter) ROHN-55 guided towers. On June 15, 1978, after much field testing and phasor calibrating, WAGL officially increased its daytime operating power to 50,000 watts using a Continental 317C-1 transmitter. At the time, there were over 5,200 AM stations in the United States, and WAGL was one of only 136 to have an authorized operating power of 50,000 watts. The Continental transmitter was reliable enough to be used for the remainder of the station's existence.

B. L. Phillips died September 1, 2014, at the age of 77. The station's license was turned in to the FCC on November 2, 2014, and cancelled by the FCC on May 7, 2015.
