= Lincoln, Buenos Aires =

Lincoln
- City
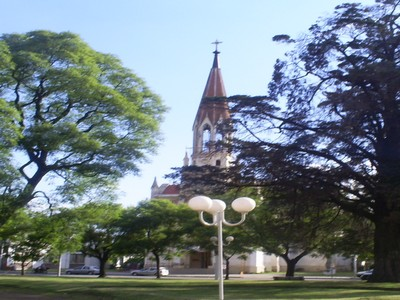
- Main square and church of Lincoln

- Location in Argentina
- Coordinates: 34°52′6″S 61°31′46″W
- Country: Argentina
- Province: Buenos Aires
- Partido: Lincoln
- Founded: 9 July 1865
- Elevation: 76 m (249 ft)

Population (2010 census [INDEC])
  - Total: 28,051
- Demonym(s): Linqueño, -eña (es)
- CPA Base: B 7060
- Area code: +54 2355

Lincoln is a city in the province of Buenos Aires in Argentina. It is the capital of the district of Lincoln (Lincoln Partido).

The district of Lincoln was established on 19 July 1865, during a redistricting of Buenos Aires Province.

The first settlement of the city of Lincoln occurred in 1871.

== Name ==
The name Lincoln was chosen as a tribute to the recently assassinated Abraham Lincoln, 16th President of the United States (1861 to 1865), and enactor of the Emancipation Proclamation.

== Economy ==
Lincoln's economy is dominated by agriculture. The main crops are wheat, maize, soy and sunflowers. The district is home to around 500,000 cows and is responsible for 10% of Argentina's honey production. Bees are bred and nourished as champions to compete in international honey producing competitions.

== Tourism ==
Carnivals held in Lincoln are the main tourist attraction, featuring carrozas, cabezudos, mechanical attractions and a non-stop music and general party ambience. Recently, the city hosts as well the Lincoln Rock Festival. Both events contribute to the arrival of the so-called turistas gasoleros (inexpensive tourism).

Lincoln's main landmark is General San Martín's park with vast, green landscapes and a small lake of clear waters.

== Sport ==
Lincoln is home to a number of football clubs, including;

- Rivadavia de Lincoln
- El Linqueño
- Argentino de Lincoln
- Juventud Unida de Lincoln

Lincoln is also home to a number of rugby, tennis and basketball clubs and benefits from an 18-hole golf course and a motor racing circuit.
