= WERF-LP =

Coordinates: 29.664°N 82.473°W

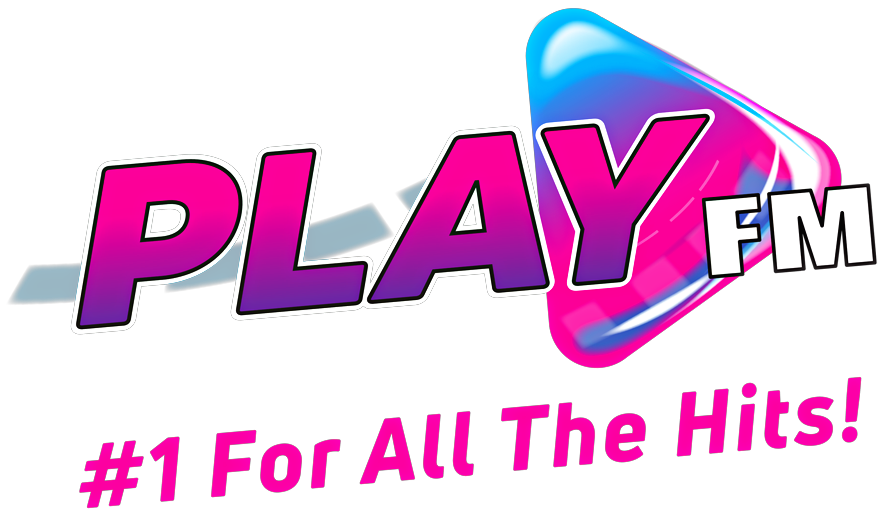

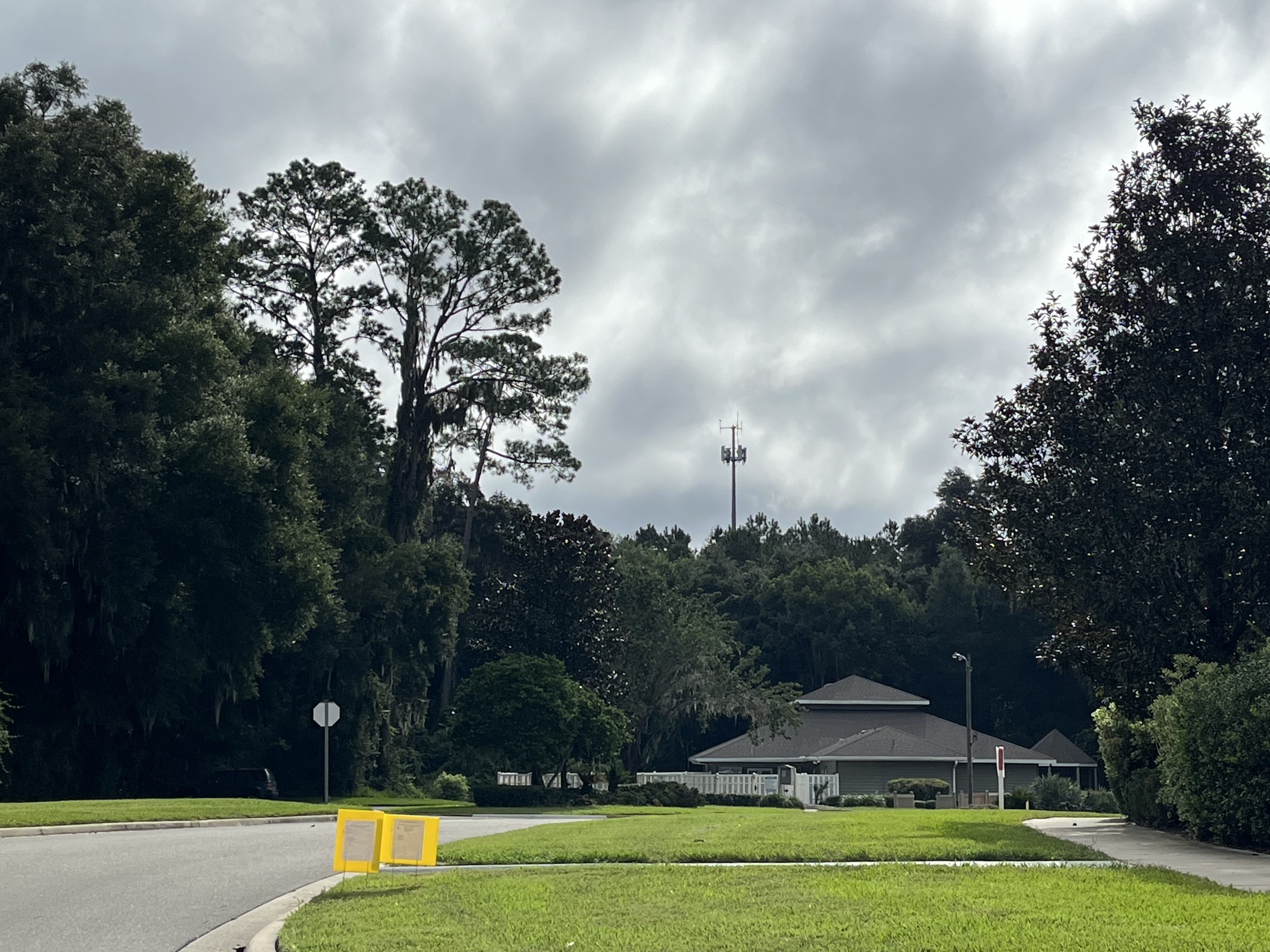
- Gainesville, Florida; United States
- Broadcast area: Gainesville, Florida
- Frequency: 105.7 MHz
- Branding: Play FM

Programming
- Format: Top 40

Ownership
- Owner: Florida Educational Broadcasting, Inc.

History
- Former frequencies: 95.7 MHz (2007–2017)

Technical information
- Licensing authority: FCC
- Class: L1
- ERP: 85 watts
- HAAT: 23 meters

Links
- Public license information: LMS
- Website: playfmonline.com

WERF-LP (105.7 FM) is a low-power educational radio station in Gainesville, Florida. WERF-LP is the second LPFM to broadcast in the Gainesville area and the first to offer a schedule based upon non-religious programs. WERF-LP broadcasts a Top-40 format from a transmitter facility located approximately 9 miles west of downtown.
