= UDP-N-acetylglucosamine—decaprenyl-phosphate N-acetylglucosaminephosphotransferase =

Class of enzymes

UDP-N-acetylglucosamine---decaprenyl-phosphate N-acetylglucosaminephosphotransferase

Identifiers
- EC no.: 2.7.8.35

Databases
- IntEnz: IntEnz view
- BRENDA: BRENDA entry
- ExPASy: NiceZyme view
- KEGG: KEGG entry
- MetaCyc: metabolic pathway
- PRIAM: profile
- PDB structures: RCSB PDB PDBe PDBsum
Search
- PMC: articles
- PubMed: articles
- NCBI: proteins

UDP-N-acetylglucosamine---decaprenyl-phosphate N-acetylglucosaminephosphotransferase (EC 2.7.8.35, GlcNAc-1-phosphate transferase, UDP-GlcNAc:undecaprenyl phosphate GlcNAc-1-phosphate transferase, WecA, WecA transferase) is an enzyme with systematic name UDP-N-acetyl-alpha-D-glucosamine:trans,octacis-decaprenyl-phosphate N-acetylglucosaminephosphotransferase. This enzyme catalyses the following chemical reaction

UDP-N-acetyl-alpha-D-glucosamine + trans,octacis-decaprenyl phosphate $\rightleftharpoons$ UMP + N-acetyl-alpha-D-glucosaminyl-diphospho-trans,octacis-decaprenol

This enzyme is isolated from Mycobacterium tuberculosis and Mycobacterium smegmatis.
