= KBGB =

- Magness, Arkansas; United States
- Frequency: 105.7 MHz
- Branding: 105.7 The Bull

Programming
- Format: Country music

Ownership
- Owner: Crain Media Group, LLC

History
- Former call signs: KKSY (2005–2007); KFXV (2007–2011); KHAN (2011–2013)

Technical information
- Licensing authority: FCC
- Facility ID: 164210
- Class: C3
- ERP: 15,000 watts
- HAAT: 130.0 meters (426.5 ft)
- Transmitter coordinates: 35°17′20.3″N 91°46′17.5″W

Links
- Public license information: Public file; LMS

KBGB (105.7 FM) is a radio station broadcasting a country music format. Licensed to Magness, Arkansas, United States, the station is currently owned by Crain Media Group, LLC.
