= KVAY =

- Lamar, Colorado; United States
- Frequency: 105.7 MHz
- Branding: Your Valley Country 105.7

Programming
- Format: Country

Ownership
- Owner: Beacon Broadcasting LLC

History
- Former call signs: KNIC (1986–1991)

Technical information
- Licensing authority: FCC
- Facility ID: 31531
- Class: C1
- ERP: 100,000 watts
- HAAT: 146.0 meters (479.0 ft)
- Transmitter coordinates: 38°6′44″N 102°57′39″W

Links
- Public license information: Public file; LMS
- Webcast: Listen live
- Website: www.kvay.com

KVAY (105.7 FM, "Your Valley Country 105.7") is a radio station broadcasting a country music format. Licensed to Lamar, Colorado, United States, the station is currently owned by Beacon Broadcasting LLC.

== History ==
The station was assigned the call sign KNIC on September 18, 1986. On August 9, 1991, the station changed its call sign to the current KVAY.
