= XHTH-FM =

Radio station in Palizada, Campeche, Mexico

- Palizada, Campeche, Mexico; Mexico
- Frequency: 105.7 MHz
- Branding: La Ke Buena

Programming
- Format: Grupera
- Affiliations: Radiópolis

Ownership
- Owner: Núcleo Comunicación del Sureste; (Radio Palizada, S.A.)

History
- First air date: 1967
- Former frequencies: 1290 AM (1967–2010); 106.5 MHz (2010–2018)

Technical information
- ERP: 6 kW
- Transmitter coordinates: 18°15′19.64″N 92°05′27.5″W

Links
- Website: www.ncscampeche.com/radiochannel/ke-buena-palizada/

XHTH-FM is a radio station in Palizada, Campeche, Mexico. Broadcasting on 105.7 FM, XHTH is owned by Núcleo Comunicación del Sureste and broadcasts the Ke Buena national grupera format.

== History ==
XETH-AM 1290 was licensed in June 1967 to Luis Trejo Castillo for operation with 250 watts of power and migrated to FM on 106.5 MHz with an authorization in 2010.

As part of the 2017 renewal of XHTH's concession, it was ordered to move to 105.7 MHz in order to clear 106-108 MHz as much as possible for community and indigenous radio stations. XHTH completed its frequency change in March 2018.
