= WECA-LP =

- Palm Bay, Florida; United States
- Frequency: 105.7 MHz

Programming
- Format: Christian

Ownership
- Owner: (New Birth F. Baptist Church, Inc.)

Technical information
- Licensing authority: FCC
- Facility ID: 196320
- Class: L1
- ERP: 100 watts
- Transmitter coordinates: 27.9525°N 80.6297°W

Links
- Public license information: LMS
- Webcast: Listen Live
- Website: newbirthfbchurch.com

WECA-LP is an American low-power FM radio station licensed by the Federal Communications Commission (FCC) to serve the community of Palm Bay, Florida on the frequency of 105.7 MHz. The station license is assigned to New Birth F. Baptist Church, Inc. WECA-LP airs a Christian radio format.

The FCC first licensed this station to begin operations on March 14, 2016, using callsign WECA-LP; the station's call sign had been assigned on May 13, 2015.
