= KTYV (FM) =

- Steamboat Springs, Colorado; United States
- Frequency: 105.7 MHz
- Branding: Sports on FM 105.7

Programming
- Format: Sports

Ownership
- Owner: Don Tlapek; (Blizzard Broadcasting LLC)

History
- Former call signs: KGGH (2016–2017); KKSB (2017–2018)

Technical information
- Licensing authority: FCC
- Facility ID: 191533
- Class: A
- ERP: 210 watts
- HAAT: 517 metres (1,696 ft)
- Transmitter coordinates: 40°27′4″N 106°45′6″W
- Translator: (97.7 MHz) K249AW (Steamboat Springs)

Links
- Public license information: Public file; LMS
- Webcast: Listen Live
- Website: Official Website

KTYV (105.7 FM) is a radio station licensed to serve the community of Steamboat Springs, Colorado. The station is owned by Don Tlapek, through licensee Blizzard Broadcasting LLC, and airs a sports radio format.

The station was assigned the call sign KGGH by the Federal Communications Commission on July 19, 2016. The station changed its call sign to KKSB on November 9, 2017, and to KTYV on June 11, 2018.
