= UDP-N-acetylglucosamine—undecaprenyl-phosphate N-acetylglucosaminephosphotransferase =

Class of enzymes

Identifiers
- EC no.: 2.7.8.33

Databases
- IntEnz: IntEnz view
- BRENDA: BRENDA entry
- ExPASy: NiceZyme view
- KEGG: KEGG entry
- MetaCyc: metabolic pathway
- PRIAM: profile
- PDB structures: RCSB PDB PDBe PDBsum
Search
- PMC: articles
- PubMed: articles
- NCBI: proteins

UDP-N-acetylglucosamine—undecaprenyl-phosphate N-acetylglucosaminephosphotransferase (EC 2.7.8.33, UDP-N-acetylglucosamine:undecaprenyl-phosphate GlcNAc-1-phosphate transferase, WecA, WecA transferase, UDP-GIcNAc:undecaprenyl phosphate N-acetylglucosaminyl 1-P transferase, GlcNAc-P-P-Und synthase, GPT, TagO, UDP-GlcNAc:undecaprenyl-phosphate GlcNAc-1-phosphate transferase, UDP-N-acetyl-D-glucosamine:ditrans,octacis-undecaprenyl phosphate N-acetylglucosaminephosphotransferase) is an enzyme with systematic name UDP-N-acetyl-alpha-D-glucosamine:ditrans,octacis-undecaprenyl phosphate N-acetyl-alpha-D-glucosaminephosphotransferase. This enzyme catalyses the following chemical reaction

UDP-N-acetyl-alpha-D-glucosamine + ditrans, octacis-undecaprenyl phosphate $\rightleftharpoons$ UMP + N-acetyl-alpha-D-glucosaminyldiphospho-ditrans, octacis-undecaprenol

This enzyme catalyses the synthesis of ditrans, octacis-undecaprenyl-N-acetyl-alpha-D-glucosaminyl diphosphate.
