= Escárcega =

City in the Mexican state of Campeche

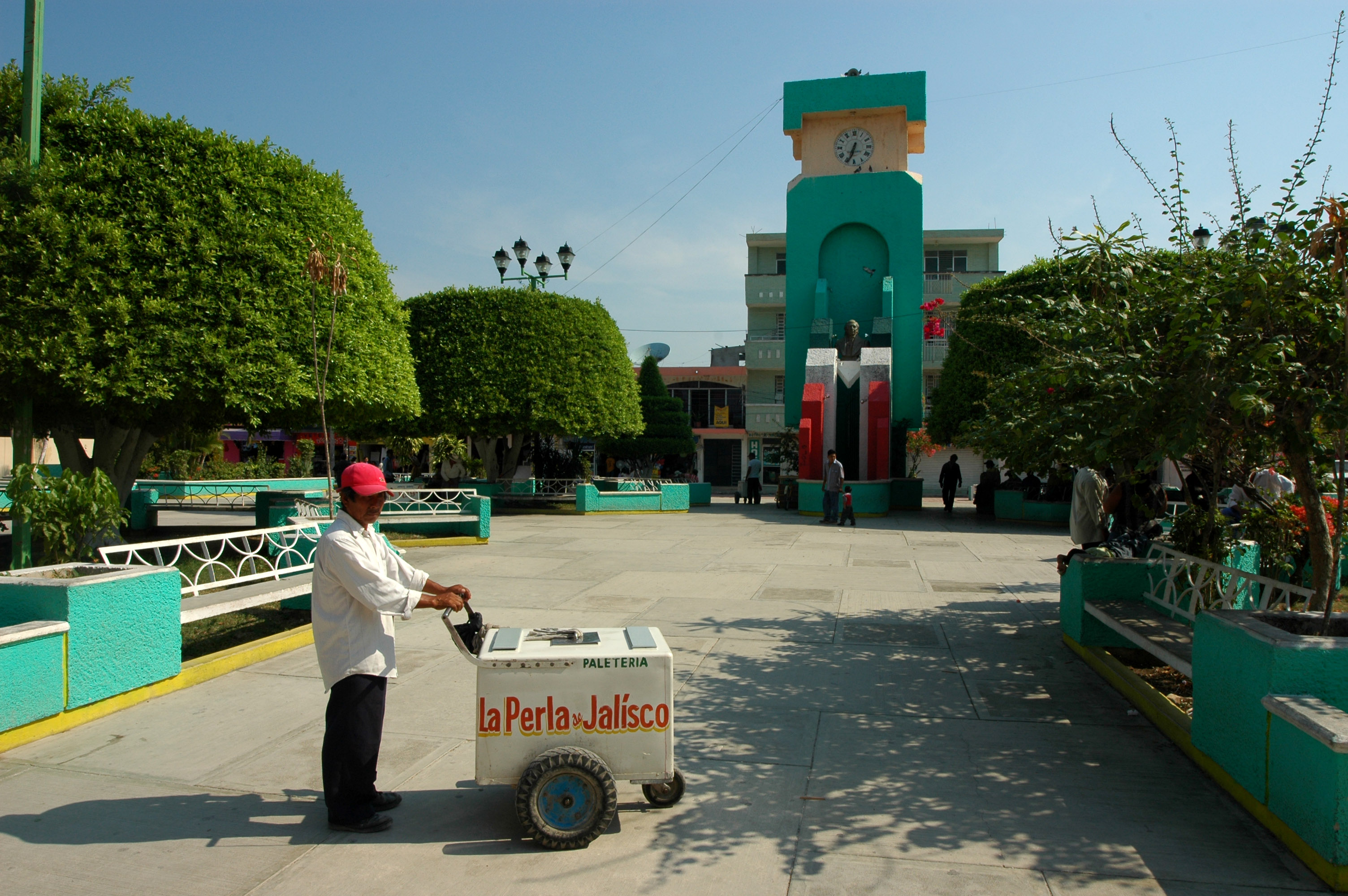

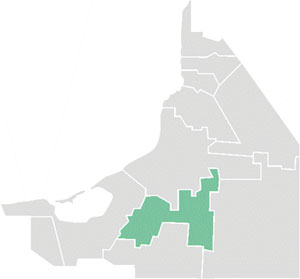

- Location within Campeche Location within Mexico
- Coordinates: 18°36′24″N 90°44′04″W
- Country: Mexico
- State: Campeche
- Municipality: Escárcega
- Ejido: 5 July 1939
- Town status: 1956
- City status: 19 July 1990
- Elevation: 85 m (279 ft)

Population (2010)
  - Total: 29,477
- Time zone: UTC−6 (Central)
- Postal code: 24350
- Area code: 982

Escárcega (Spanish pronunciation: [esˈkaɾseɣa]) is a small city in the Mexican state of Campeche, located at 18.62°N 90.74°W in the central part of the state. As of 2010, the city of Escárcega had a population of 29,477.

The city serves as the administrative centre for the surrounding municipality of the same name, which includes the city and its hinterland. In 2010 the population of Escárcega municipality was 54,184. Its area is 4,569.64 km^{2} (1,764.35 sq mi), which includes many smaller outlying communities, the largest of which is called División del Norte.

Escárcega is at the junction of Federal Highways 251 and 186, and is crossed by the railway that runs from Coatzacoalcos, Veracruz, to Campeche, Campeche. It is a new city that grew up in the 20th century with the arrival of the railways and roads. It is named after Francisco Escárcega, a native of Tlaxcala who fought in the Mexican Revolution and oversaw the construction of much of the rail network in the country's southeast.

== Geography ==
=== Climate ===
Climate data for Escárcega (1991–2020)
| Month | Jan | Feb | Mar | Apr | May | Jun | Jul | Aug | Sep | Oct | Nov | Dec | Year |
|---|---|---|---|---|---|---|---|---|---|---|---|---|---|
| Record high °C (°F) | 40.0 (104.0) | 39.0 (102.2) | 44.0 (111.2) | 44.0 (111.2) | 44.0 (111.2) | 42.0 (107.6) | 42.5 (108.5) | 40.0 (104.0) | 40.0 (104.0) | 39.5 (103.1) | 38.0 (100.4) | 38.0 (100.4) | 44.0 (111.2) |
| Mean daily maximum °C (°F) | 29.1 (84.4) | 31.7 (89.1) | 34.6 (94.3) | 37.6 (99.7) | 38.1 (100.6) | 36.1 (97.0) | 35.9 (96.6) | 35.2 (95.4) | 34.2 (93.6) | 31.9 (89.4) | 30.2 (86.4) | 29.1 (84.4) | 33.6 (92.5) |
| Daily mean °C (°F) | 23.3 (73.9) | 25.1 (77.2) | 27.1 (80.8) | 29.5 (85.1) | 30.3 (86.5) | 29.3 (84.7) | 28.9 (84.0) | 28.5 (83.3) | 27.8 (82.0) | 26.2 (79.2) | 24.8 (76.6) | 23.7 (74.7) | 27.0 (80.6) |
| Mean daily minimum °C (°F) | 17.4 (63.3) | 18.5 (65.3) | 19.6 (67.3) | 21.4 (70.5) | 22.5 (72.5) | 22.5 (72.5) | 22.0 (71.6) | 21.8 (71.2) | 21.5 (70.7) | 20.5 (68.9) | 19.4 (66.9) | 18.2 (64.8) | 20.4 (68.7) |
| Record low °C (°F) | 4.0 (39.2) | 5.0 (41.0) | 7.0 (44.6) | 9.5 (49.1) | 13.0 (55.4) | 13.0 (55.4) | 16.0 (60.8) | 15.0 (59.0) | 15.0 (59.0) | 10.0 (50.0) | 8.0 (46.4) | 6.0 (42.8) | 4.0 (39.2) |
| Average precipitation mm (inches) | 37.3 (1.47) | 31.6 (1.24) | 16.2 (0.64) | 35.2 (1.39) | 93.5 (3.68) | 250.0 (9.84) | 175.9 (6.93) | 269.2 (10.60) | 306.0 (12.05) | 212.4 (8.36) | 85.2 (3.35) | 44.7 (1.76) | 1,557.3 (61.31) |
| Average precipitation days (≥ 0.1 mm) | 7.0 | 4.1 | 3.0 | 3.3 | 7.1 | 15.9 | 16.5 | 20.2 | 19.4 | 15.7 | 8.7 | 6.9 | 127.8 |
Source: Servicio Meteorológico National
