= Maya civilization =

Mesoamerican civilization (c. 2000 BC – 1697 AD)

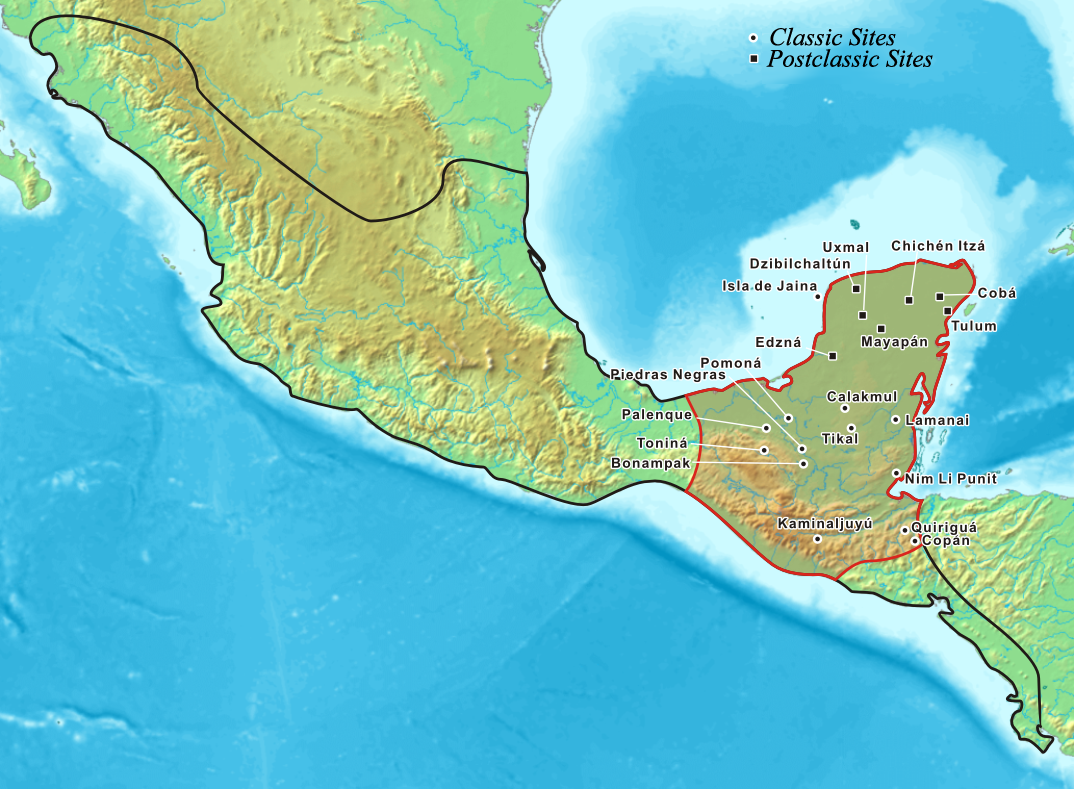
- Maya city-states in Mesoamerica
- Religion: Maya religion
- Geographical range: Maya Region in Mesoamerica
- Period: Mesoamerican Preclassic Period to Colonial Period
- Dates: c. 2000 BC – 1697 AD
- Type site: Uaxactun; Dzibilchaltun
- Major sites: Chichen Itzá; Tikal; Tulum; El Mirador; Copán; Cobá; Uxmal; Xunantunich; Calakmul
- Preceded by: Archaic Period
- Followed by: New Spain; Captaincy General of Guatemala
- Cause of collapse: Spanish conquest of the Maya

El Castillo, at Chichen Itza

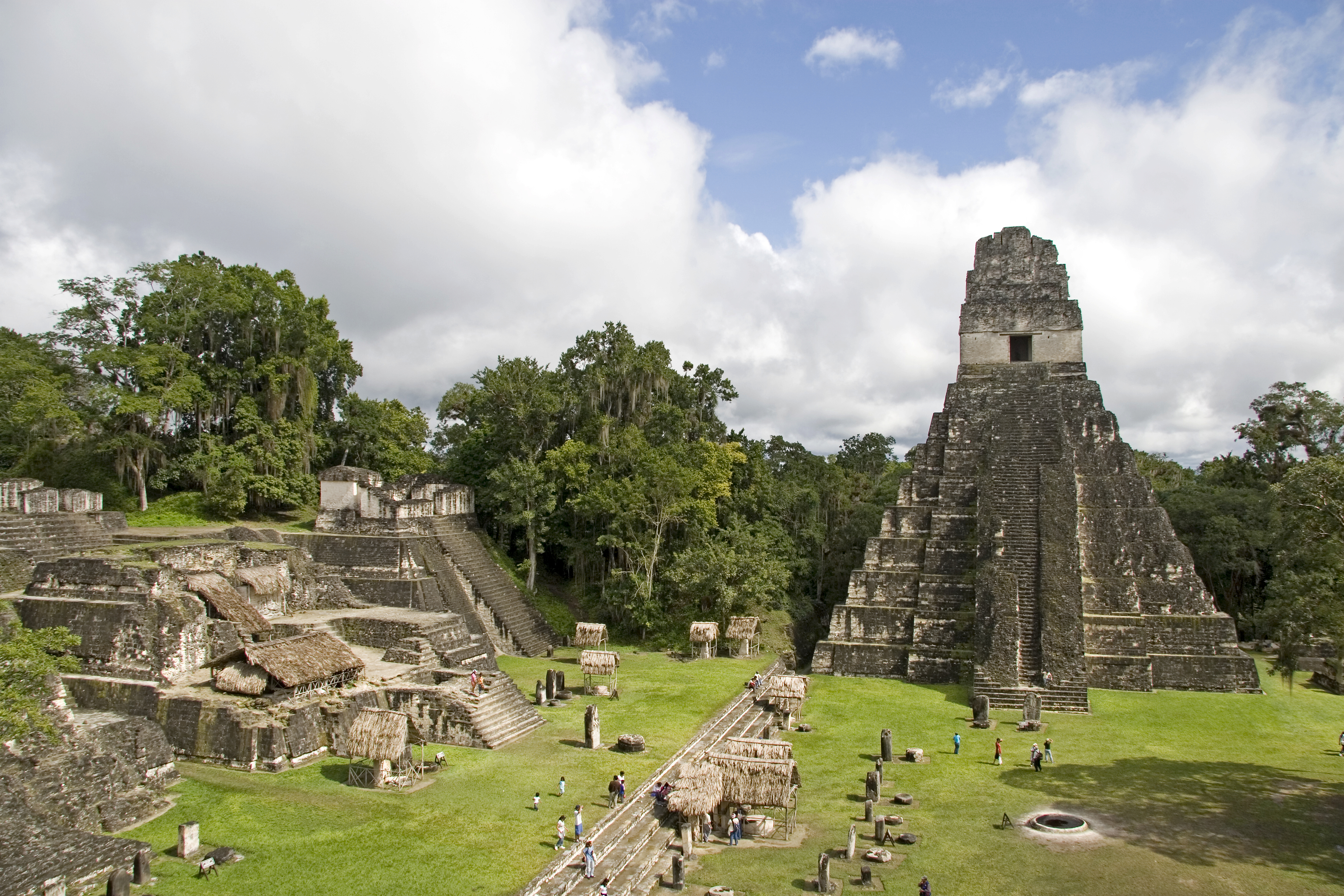
Temple of the Great Jaguar, at Tikal

The Maya civilization (/ˈmaɪə/) was a Mesoamerican civilization that existed from antiquity to the early modern period. Known by its ancient temples and glyphs (script), the civilization is also noted for its art, architecture, mathematics, calendar, and astronomical system. The Maya script is the most sophisticated and highly developed writing system in the pre-Columbian Americas.

The Maya civilization developed in the Maya Region, an area that today comprises southeastern Mexico, all of Guatemala and Belize, and the western portions of Honduras and El Salvador. Today, their descendants, known collectively as the Maya, number well over 6 million individuals, speak more than twenty-eight surviving Mayan languages, and reside in nearly the same area.

The Archaic period, before 2000 BC, saw the first developments in agriculture and the earliest villages. The Preclassic period (c. 2000 BC to 250 AD) saw the establishment of the first complex societies in the Maya region, and the cultivation of the staple crops of the Maya diet, including maize, beans, squashes, and chili peppers. The first Maya cities developed around 750 BC. Hieroglyphic writing was being used in the Maya region by the 3rd century BC. In the Late Preclassic, a number of large cities developed in the Petén Basin, and the city of Kaminaljuyu rose to prominence in the Guatemalan Highlands. Beginning around 250 AD, the Classic period is largely defined as when the Maya were raising sculpted monuments with Long Count dates. This period saw the Maya civilization develop many city-states linked by a complex trade network. In the Maya Lowlands two great rivals, the cities of Tikal and Calakmul, became powerful. The Classic period also saw the intrusive intervention of the central Mexican city of Teotihuacan in Maya dynastic politics. In the 9th century, there was a widespread political collapse in the central Maya region, resulting in civil wars, the abandonment of cities, and a northward shift of population.

The Postclassic period saw the rise of Chichen Itza in the north, and the expansion of the aggressive Kʼicheʼ kingdom in the Guatemalan Highlands. In the 16th century, the Spanish Empire colonized the Mesoamerican region, and a lengthy series of campaigns saw the fall of Nojpetén, the last Maya city, in 1697. Rule during the Classic period centred on the concept of the "divine king", who was thought to act as a mediator between mortals and the supernatural realm. Kingship was usually (but not exclusively) patrilineal, and power normally passed to the eldest son. A prospective king was expected to be a successful war leader as well as a ruler. Closed patronage systems were the dominant force in Maya politics, although how patronage affected the political makeup of a kingdom varied from city-state to city-state. By the Late Classic period, the aristocracy had grown in size, reducing the previously exclusive power of the king. The Maya developed sophisticated art forms using both perishable and non-perishable materials, including wood, jade, obsidian, ceramics, sculpted stone monuments, stucco, and finely painted murals. The Maya elite were literate, and developed a complex system of hieroglyphic writing. The Maya recorded their history and ritual knowledge in screenfold books, of which only three uncontested examples remain. In addition, a great many examples of Maya texts can be found on stelae and ceramics. The Maya developed a highly complex series of interlocking ritual calendars, and employed mathematics that included one of the earliest known instances of the explicit zero in human history. As a part of their religion, the Maya practised human sacrifice.

== Etymology ==
"Maya" is a modern term used to refer collectively to the various peoples that inhabited this area, as Maya peoples have not had a sense of a common ethnic identity or political unity for the vast majority of their history. Early Spanish and Mayan-language colonial sources in the Yucatán Peninsula used the term "Maya" to denote both the language spoken by the Yucatec Maya and the area surrounding the then-abandoned city of Mayapán. The term "Maya" was derived from the city of Mayapán. Some colonial Mayan-language sources also used "Maya" to refer to other Maya groups, sometimes pejoratively in reference to Maya groups more resistant to Spanish rule.

== Geography ==
Maya area

The Maya civilization occupied a wide territory that included southeastern Mexico and northern Central America. This area included the entire Yucatán Peninsula and all of the territory now in the modern countries of Guatemala and Belize, as well as the western portions of Honduras and El Salvador. Most of the peninsula is formed by a vast plain with few hills or mountains and a generally low coastline. The territory of the Maya covered a third of Mesoamerica, and the Maya were engaged in a dynamic relationship with neighbouring cultures that included the Olmecs, Mixtecs, Teotihuacan, and Aztecs. During the Early Classic period, the Maya cities of Tikal and Kaminaljuyu were key Maya foci in a network that extended into the highlands of central Mexico; there was a strong Maya presence at the Tetitla compound of Teotihuacan. The Maya city of Chichen Itza and the distant Toltec capital of Tula had an especially close relationship.

The Petén region consists of densely forested low-lying limestone plain; a chain of fourteen lakes runs across the central drainage basin of Petén. To the south the plain gradually rises towards the Guatemalan Highlands. The dense Maya forest covers northern Petén and Belize, most of Quintana Roo, southern Campeche, and a portion of the south of Yucatán state. Farther north, the vegetation turns to lower forest consisting of dense scrub.

The littoral zone of Soconusco lies to the south of the Sierra Madre de Chiapas, and consists of a narrow coastal plain and the foothills of the Sierra Madre. The Maya highlands extend eastwards from Chiapas into Guatemala, reaching their highest in the Sierra de los Cuchumatanes. Their major pre-Columbian population centres were in the largest highland valleys, such as the Valley of Guatemala and the Quetzaltenango Valley. In the southern highlands, a belt of volcanic cones runs parallel to the Pacific coast. The highlands extend northwards into Verapaz, and gradually descend to the east.

== History ==
The history of Maya civilization is divided into three principal periods: the Preclassic, Classic, and Postclassic. These were preceded by the Archaic Period, during which the first settled villages and early developments in agriculture emerged. Modern scholars regard these periods as arbitrary divisions of Maya chronology, rather than indicative of cultural evolution or decline. Definitions of the start and end dates of period spans can vary by as much as a century, depending on the author.

Maya chronology
Period	Division		Dates
Archaic			8000–2000 BC
Preclassic	Early Preclassic		2000–1000 BC
Preclassic	Middle Preclassic	Early Middle Preclassic	1000–600 BC
Preclassic	Middle Preclassic	Late Middle Preclassic	600–350 BC
Preclassic	Late Preclassic	Early Late Preclassic	350–1 BC
Preclassic	Late Preclassic	Late Late Preclassic	1 BC – AD 159
Preclassic	Late Preclassic	Terminal Preclassic	AD 159–250
Classic	Early Classic		AD 250–550
Classic	Late Classic		AD 550–830
Classic	Terminal Classic		AD 830–950
Postclassic	Early Postclassic		AD 950–1200
Postclassic	Late Postclassic		AD 1200–1539
Contact period			AD 1511–1697

=== Preclassic period (c. 2000 BC – 250 AD) ===
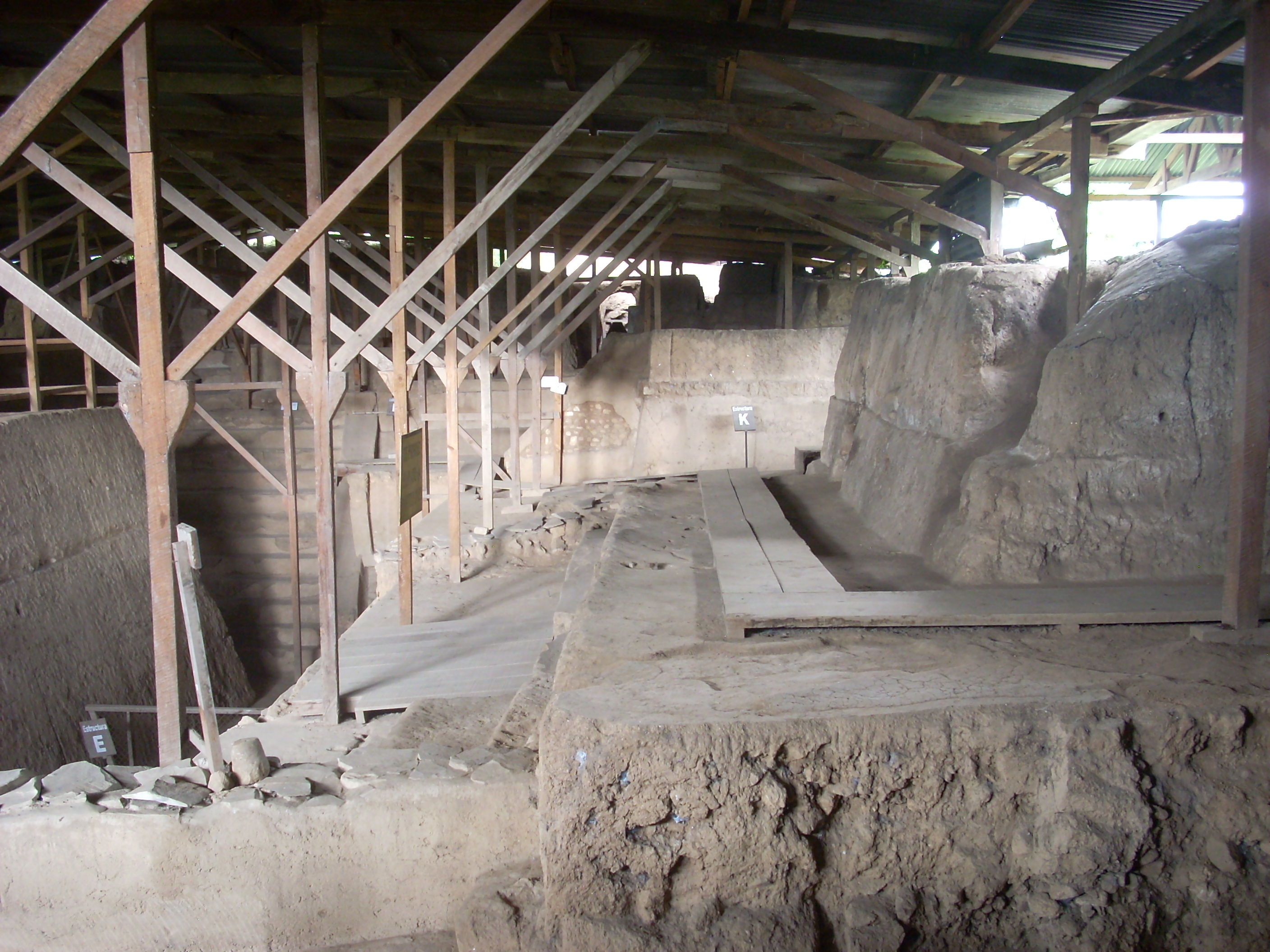
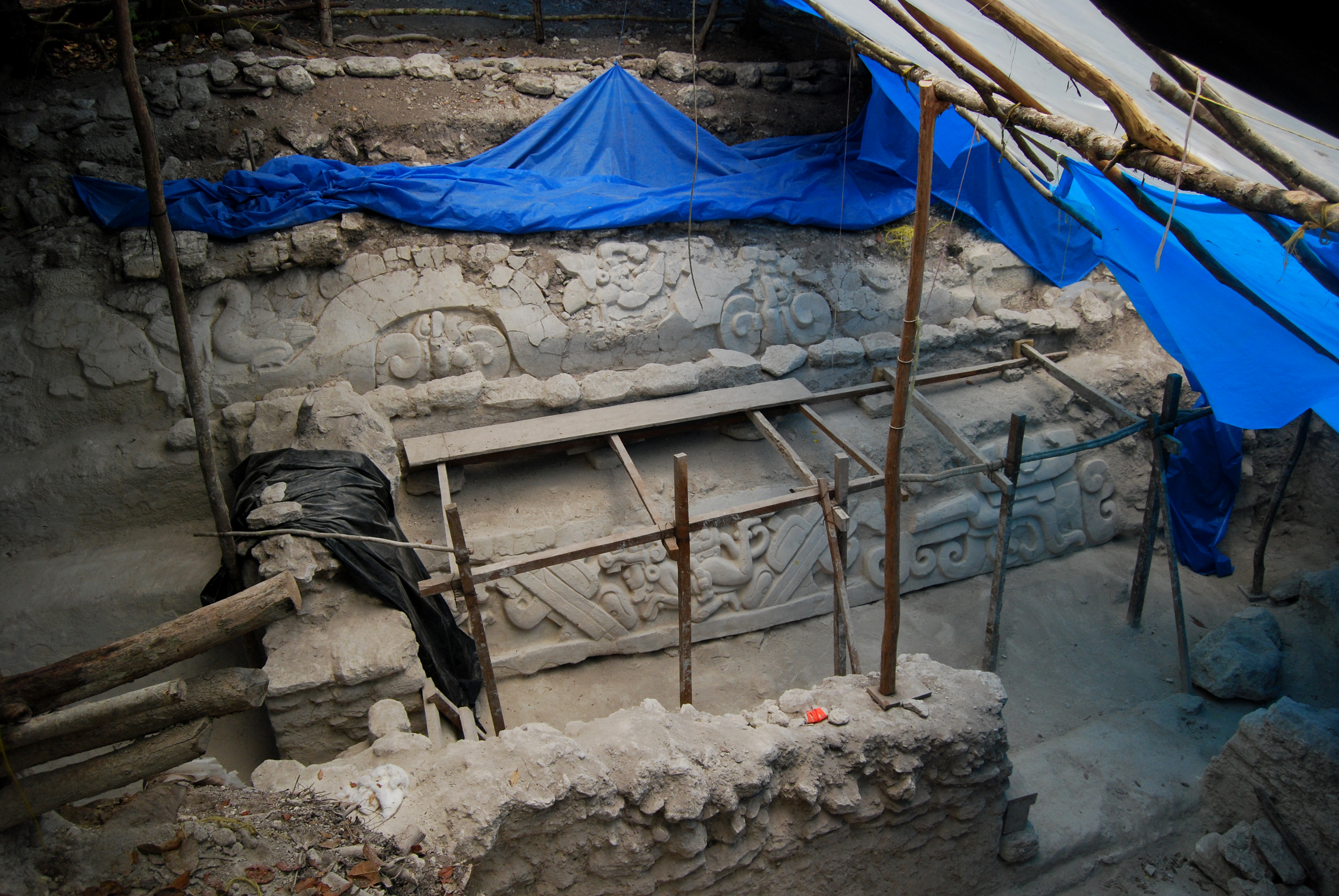
Kaminaljuyu, in the highlands, and El Mirador, in the lowlands, were both important cities in the Late Preclassic.

The Maya developed their first civilization in the Preclassic period. Scholars continue to discuss when this era of Maya civilization began. Maya occupation at Cuello (modern Belize) has been carbon dated to around 2600 BC. Settlements were established around 1800 BC in the Soconusco region of the Pacific coast, and the Maya were already cultivating the staple crops of maize, beans, squash, and chili pepper. This period was characterized by sedentary communities and the introduction of pottery and fired clay figurines.

During the Middle Preclassic Period, small villages began to grow to form cities. Nakbe in the Petén department of Guatemala is the earliest well-documented city in the Maya lowlands, where large structures have been dated to around 750 BC. The northern lowlands of Yucatán were widely settled by the Middle Preclassic. By approximately 400 BC, early Maya rulers were raising stelae. A developed script was already being used in Petén by the 3rd century BC. In the Late Preclassic Period, the enormous city of El Mirador grew to cover approximately 16 square kilometres (6.2 sq mi). Although not as large, Tikal was already a significant city by around 350 BC.

In the highlands, Kaminaljuyu emerged as a principal centre in the Late Preclassic. Takalik Abaj and Chocolá were two of the most important cities on the Pacific coastal plain, and Komchen grew to become an important site in northern Yucatán. The Late Preclassic cultural florescence collapsed in the 1st century AD and many of the great Maya cities of the epoch were abandoned; the cause of this collapse is unknown.

=== Classic period (c. 250–900 AD) ===
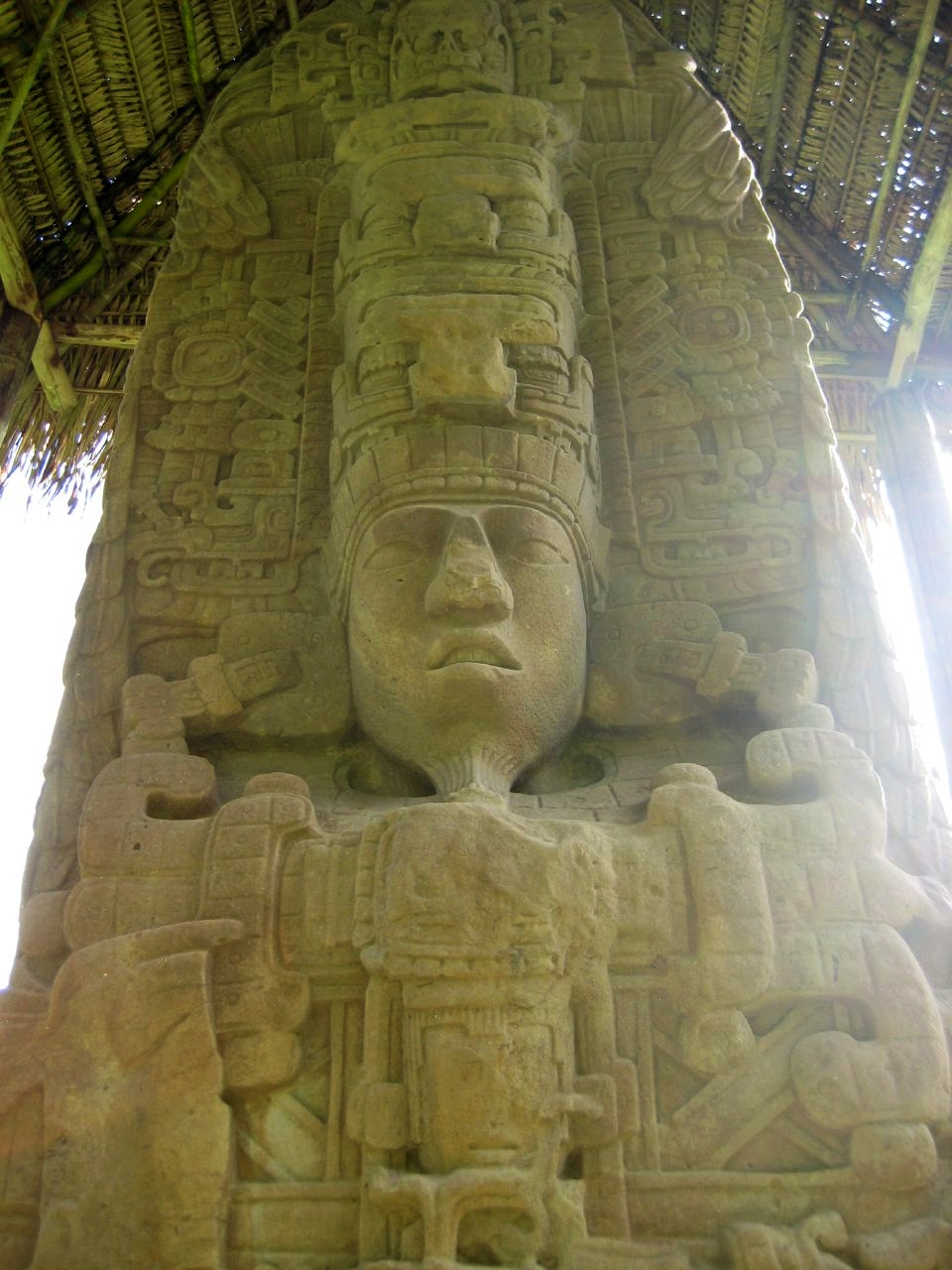
Stela D from Quiriguá, representing king Kʼakʼ Tiliw Chan Yopaat

The Classic period is largely defined as the period during which the lowland Maya raised dated monuments using the Long Count calendar. This period marked the peak of large-scale construction and urbanism, the recording of monumental inscriptions, and demonstrated significant intellectual and artistic development, particularly in the southern lowland regions. The Classic period Maya political landscape has been likened to that of Renaissance Italy or Classical Greece, with multiple city-states engaged in a complex network of alliances and enmities. The largest cities had 50,000 to 120,000 people and were linked to networks of subsidiary sites.

During the Early Classic, cities throughout the Maya region were influenced by the great metropolis of Teotihuacan in the distant Valley of Mexico. In AD 378, Teotihuacan decisively intervened at Tikal and other nearby cities, deposed their rulers, and installed a new Teotihuacan-backed dynasty. This intervention was led by Siyaj Kʼakʼ ("Born of Fire"), who arrived at Tikal in early 378. The king of Tikal, Chak Tok Ichʼaak I, died on the same day, suggesting a violent takeover. A year later, Siyaj Kʼakʼ oversaw the installation of a new king, Yax Nuun Ahiin I. This led to a period of political dominance when Tikal became the most powerful city in the central lowlands.

Tikal's great rival was Calakmul, another powerful city in the Petén Basin. Tikal and Calakmul both developed extensive systems of allies and vassals; lesser cities that entered one of these networks gained prestige from their association with the top-tier city, and maintained peaceful relations with members of the network. Tikal and Calakmul engaged in the manoeuvering of their alliance networks against each other. At various points during the Classic period, one or other of these powers would gain a strategic victory over its great rival, resulting in respective periods of florescence and decline.

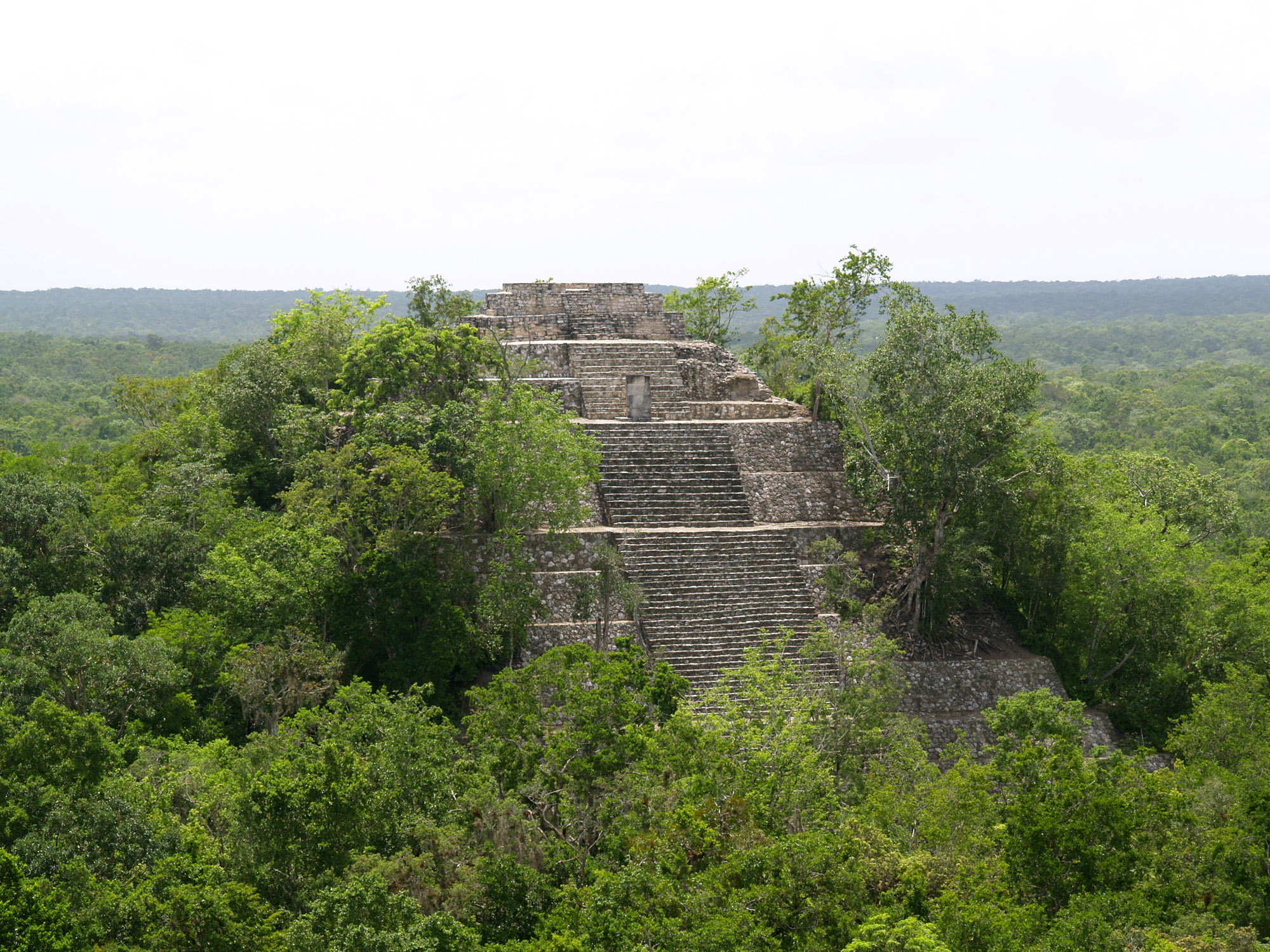
Calakmul was one of the most important Classic period cities.

In 629, Bʼalaj Chan Kʼawiil, a son of the Tikal king Kʼinich Muwaan Jol II, was sent to found a new city at Dos Pilas, in the Petexbatún region, apparently as an outpost to extend Tikal's power beyond the reach of Calakmul. For the next two decades he fought loyally for his brother and overlord at Tikal. In 648, king Yuknoom Chʼeen II of Calakmul captured Balaj Chan Kʼawiil. Yuknoom Chʼeen II then reinstated Balaj Chan Kʼawiil upon the throne of Dos Pilas as his vassal. He thereafter served as a loyal ally of Calakmul.

In the southeast, Copán was the most important city. Its Classic-period dynasty was founded in 426 by Kʼinich Yax Kʼukʼ Moʼ. The new king had strong ties with central Petén and Teotihuacan. Copán reached the height of its cultural and artistic development during the rule of Uaxaclajuun Ubʼaah Kʼawiil, who ruled from 695 to 738. His reign ended catastrophically when he was captured by his vassal, king Kʼakʼ Tiliw Chan Yopaat of Quiriguá. The captured lord of Copán was taken back to Quiriguá and was decapitated in a public ritual. It is likely that this coup was backed by Calakmul, in order to weaken a powerful ally of Tikal. Palenque and Yaxchilan were the most powerful cities in the Usumacinta region. In the highlands, Kaminaljuyu in the Valley of Guatemala was already a sprawling city by 300. In the north of the Maya area, Coba was the most important capital.

==== Classic Maya collapse ====
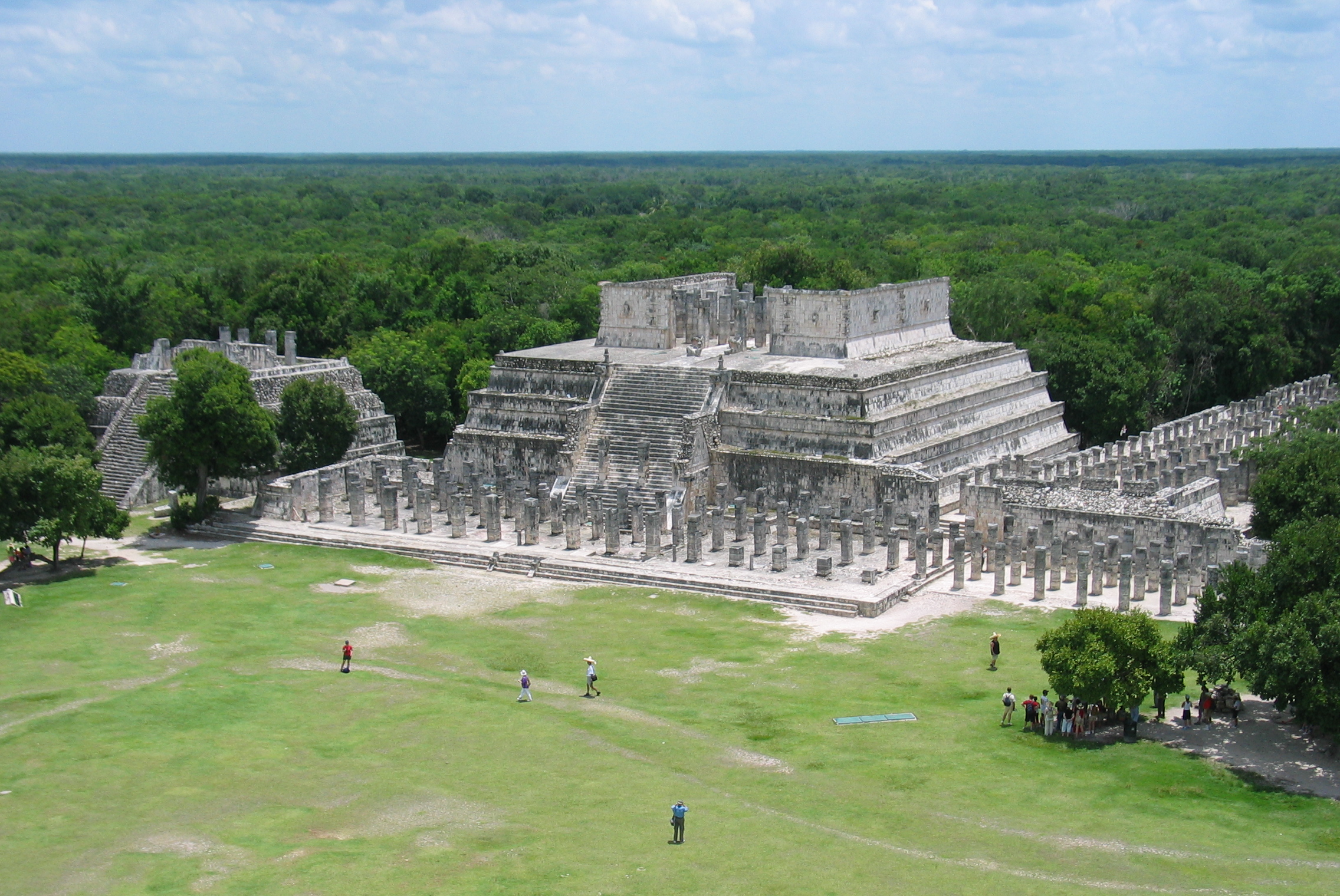
Temple of the Warriors at Chichen Itza, which emerged to be one of the most important northern Maya cities in the Terminal Classic period.

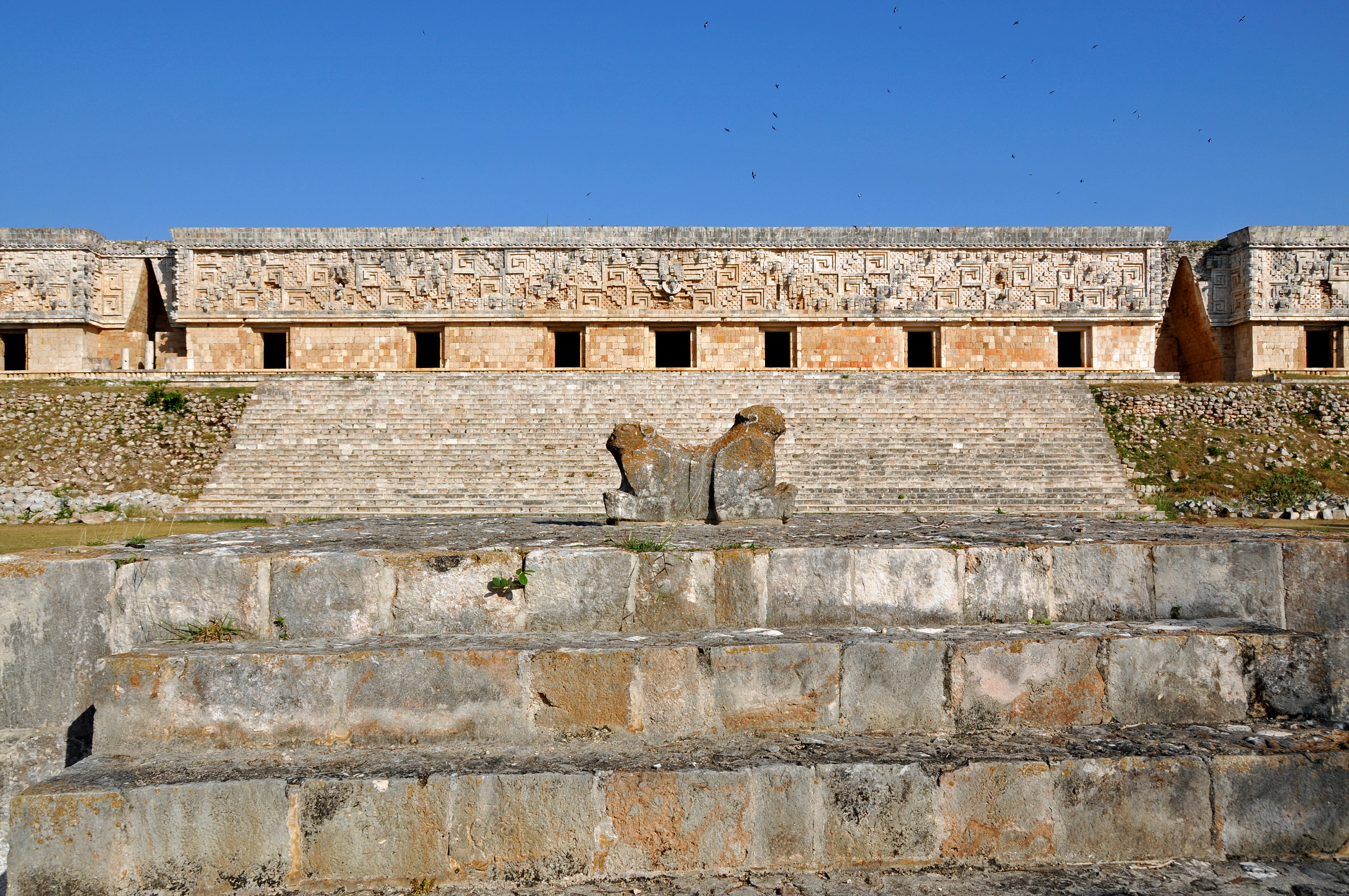
The Throne of the Jaguar in front of the Governor's Palace at Uxmal, another northern Maya city that thrived in the Terminal Classic period.

During the 9th century AD, the central Maya region suffered major political collapse, marked by the abandonment of cities, the ending of dynasties, and a northward shift in activity. No universally accepted theory explains this collapse, but it likely had a combination of causes, including endemic internecine warfare, overpopulation resulting in severe environmental degradation, and drought. During this period, known as the Terminal Classic, the northern cities of Chichen Itza and Uxmal showed increased activity. Major cities in the northern Yucatán Peninsula were inhabited long after the cities of the southern lowlands ceased to raise monuments.

Classic Maya social organization was based on the ritual authority of the ruler, rather than central control of trade and food distribution. This model was poorly structured to respond to changes, because the ruler's actions were limited by tradition to such activities as construction, ritual, and warfare. This only served to exacerbate systemic problems. By the 9th and 10th centuries, this resulted in collapse of this system of rulership. In the northern Yucatán, individual rule was replaced by a ruling council formed from elite lineages. In the southern Yucatán and central Petén, kingdoms declined; in western Petén and some other areas, the changes were catastrophic and resulted in the rapid depopulation of cities. Within a couple of generations, large swathes of the central Maya area were all but abandoned. Both the capitals and their secondary centres were generally abandoned within a period of 50 to 100 years. One by one, cities stopped sculpting dated monuments; the last Long Count date was inscribed at Toniná in 909. Stelae were no longer raised, and squatters moved into abandoned royal palaces. Mesoamerican trade routes shifted and bypassed Petén.

=== Postclassic period (c. 950–1539 AD) ===
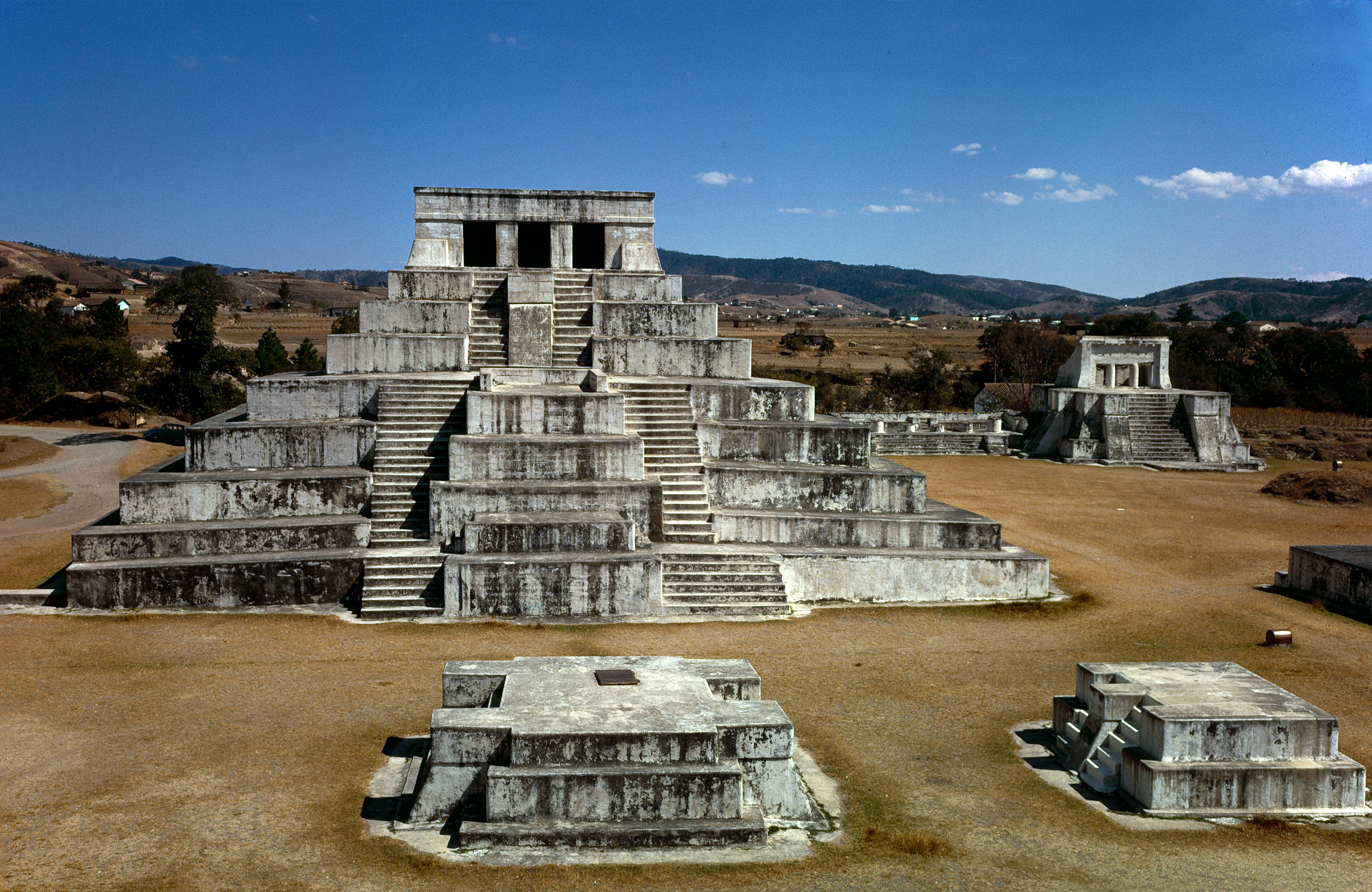
Zaculeu was capital of the Postclassic Mam kingdom in the Guatemalan Highlands.

Although much reduced, a significant Maya presence remained into the Postclassic period after the abandonment of the major Classic period cities; the population was particularly concentrated near permanent water sources. Unlike during previous cycles of contraction, abandoned lands were not quickly resettled in the Postclassic. Activity shifted to the northern lowlands and the Maya Highlands; this may have involved migration from the southern lowlands, because many Postclassic Maya groups had migration myths. Chichen Itza and its Puuc neighbours declined dramatically in the 11th century, and this may represent the final episode of Classic Period collapse. After the decline of Chichen Itza, the Maya region lacked a dominant power until the rise of the city of Mayapan in the 12th century. New cities arose near the Caribbean and Gulf coasts, and new trade networks were formed.

The Postclassic Period was marked by changes from the preceding Classic Period. The once-great city of Kaminaljuyu in the Valley of Guatemala was abandoned after continuous occupation of almost 2,000 years. Across the highlands and neighbouring Pacific coast, cities came to occupy more-easily defended hilltop locations surrounded by deep ravines, with ditch-and-wall defences sometimes supplementing the natural terrain. One of the most important cities in the Guatemalan Highlands at this time was Qʼumarkaj, the capital of the aggressive Kʼicheʼ kingdom. The government of Maya states, from the Yucatán to the Guatemalan highlands, was often organized as joint rule by a council. However, in practice one member of the council could act as a supreme ruler, while the other members served him as advisors.

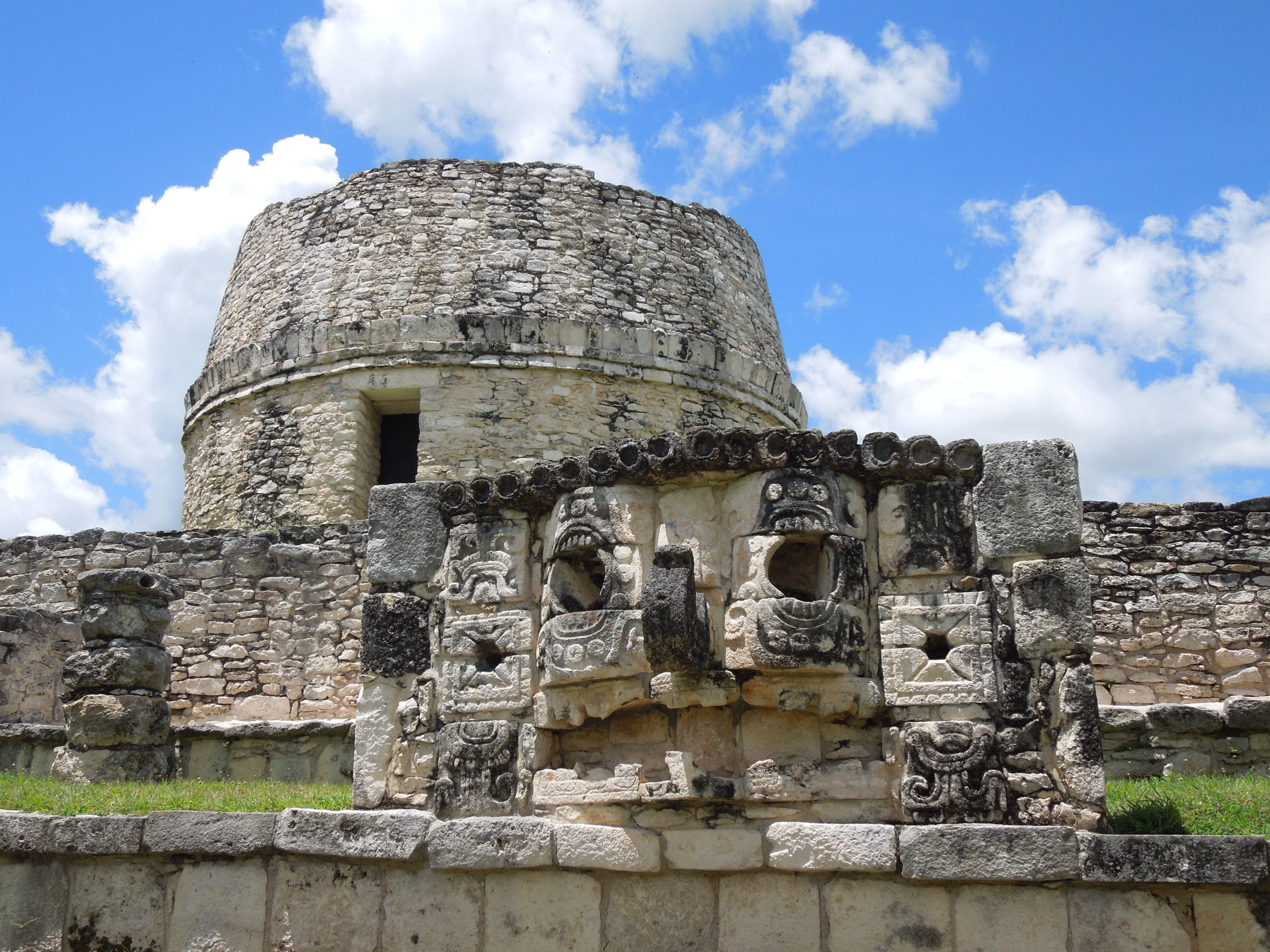
Mayapan was an important Postclassic city in the northern Yucatán Peninsula.

Mayapan was abandoned around 1448, after a period of political, social and environmental turbulence that in many ways echoed the Classic period collapse in the southern Maya region. The city's abandonment initiated a protracted era of endemic warfare, disease, and severe climatic disruptions across the Yucatán Peninsula, which ultimately subsided shortly before Spanish contact in 1511. Even without a dominant regional capital, the early Spanish explorers reported wealthy coastal cities and thriving marketplaces. During the Late Postclassic, the Yucatán Peninsula was divided into a number of independent provinces that shared a common culture but varied in internal sociopolitical organization. On the eve of the Spanish conquest, the highlands of Guatemala were dominated by several powerful Maya states. The Kʼicheʼ had carved out a small empire covering a large part of the western Guatemalan Highlands and the neighbouring Pacific coastal plain. However, in the decades before the Spanish conquest the Kaqchikel kingdom had been steadily eroding the kingdom of the Kʼicheʼ.

=== Contact period and Spanish conquest (1511–1697 AD) ===
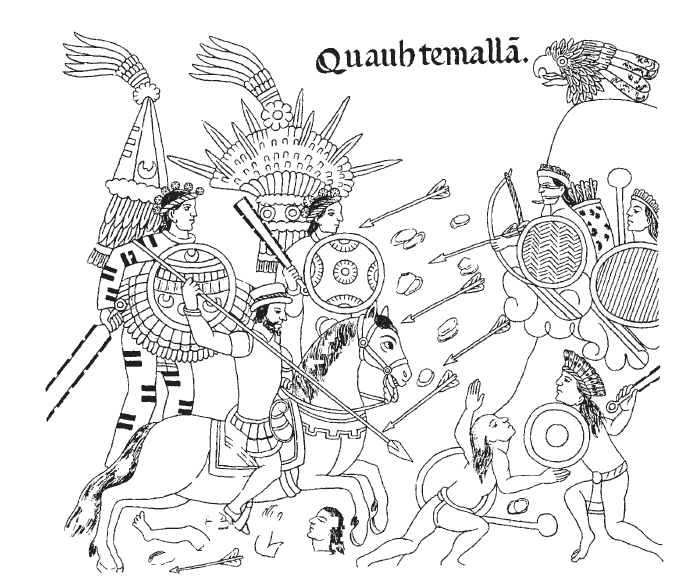
Page from the Lienzo de Tlaxcala showing the Spanish conquest of Iximche, known as Cuahtemallan in the Nahuatl language

In 1511, a Spanish caravel was wrecked in the Caribbean, and about a dozen survivors made landfall on the coast of Yucatán. They were seized by a Maya lord, and most were sacrificed, although two escaped. From 1517 to 1519, three separate Spanish expeditions explored the Yucatán coast, and engaged in a number of battles with the Maya inhabitants. After the Aztec capital Tenochtitlan fell to the Spanish in 1521, Hernán Cortés despatched Pedro de Alvarado to Guatemala with 180 cavalry, 300 infantry, 4 cannons, and thousands of allied warriors from central Mexico; they arrived in Soconusco in 1523. The Kʼicheʼ capital, Qʼumarkaj, fell to Alvarado in 1524. Shortly afterwards, the Spanish were invited as allies into Iximche, the capital city of the Kaqchikel Maya. Good relations did not last, due to excessive Spanish demands for gold as tribute, and the city was abandoned a few months later. This was followed by the fall of Zaculeu, the Mam Maya capital, in 1525. Francisco de Montejo and his son, Francisco de Montejo the Younger, launched a long series of campaigns against the polities of the Yucatán Peninsula in 1527, and finally completed the conquest of the northern portion of the peninsula in 1546. This left only the Maya kingdoms of the Petén Basin independent. In 1697, Martín de Ursúa launched an assault on the Itza capital Nojpetén and the last independent Maya city fell to the Spanish.

=== Persistence of Maya culture ===
The Spanish conquest stripped away most of the defining features of Maya civilization. However, many Maya villages remained remote from Spanish colonial authority, and for the most part continued to manage their own affairs. Maya communities and the nuclear family maintained their traditional day-to-day life. The basic Mesoamerican diet of maize and beans continued, although agricultural output was improved by the introduction of steel tools. Traditional crafts such as weaving, ceramics, and basketry continued to be practised. Community markets and trade in local products continued long after the conquest. At times, the colonial administration encouraged the traditional economy in order to extract tribute in the form of ceramics or cotton textiles, although these were usually made to European specifications. Maya beliefs and language proved resistant to change, despite vigorous efforts by Catholic missionaries. The 260-day tzolkʼin ritual calendar continues in use in modern Maya communities in the highlands of Guatemala and Chiapas, and millions of Mayan-language speakers inhabit the territory in which their ancestors developed their civilization.

=== Investigation of Maya civilization ===
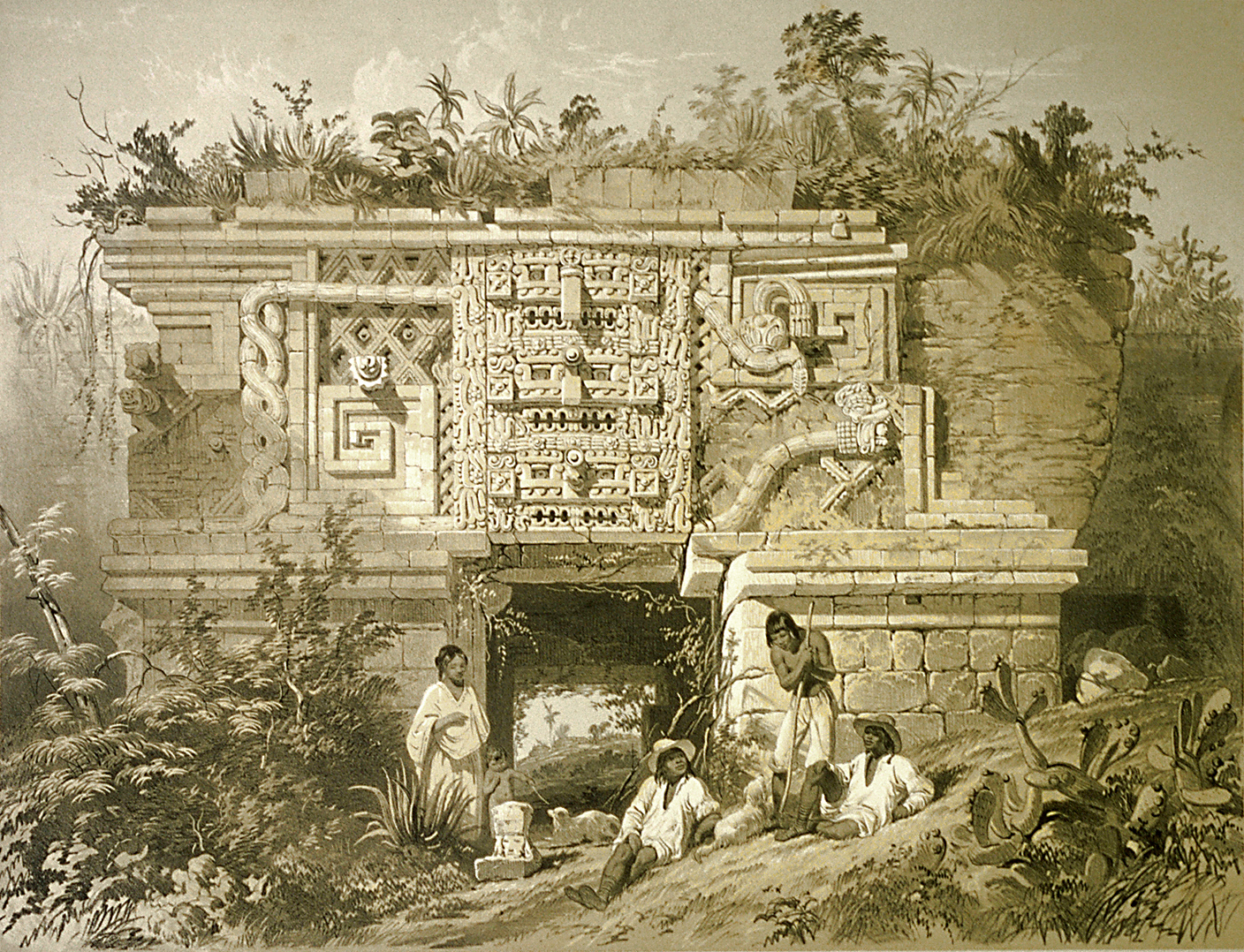
Drawing by Frederick Catherwood of the Nunnery complex at Uxmal

The agents of the Catholic Church wrote detailed accounts of the Maya, in support of their efforts at Christianization, and absorption of the Maya into the Spanish Empire. This was followed by various Spanish priests and colonial officials who left descriptions of ruins they visited in Yucatán and Central America. In 1839, American traveller and writer John Lloyd Stephens set out to visit a number of Maya sites with English architect and draftsman Frederick Catherwood. Their illustrated accounts of the ruins sparked strong popular interest, and brought the Maya to world attention. The later 19th century saw the recording and recovery of ethnohistoric accounts of the Maya, and the first steps in deciphering Maya hieroglyphs.

The final two decades of the 19th century saw the birth of modern scientific archaeology in the Maya region, with the meticulous work of Alfred Maudslay and Teoberto Maler. By the early 20th century, the Peabody Museum was sponsoring excavations at Copán and in the Yucatán Peninsula. In the first two decades of the 20th century, advances were made in deciphering the Maya calendar, and identifying deities, dates, and religious concepts. Since the 1930s, archaeological exploration increased dramatically, with large-scale excavations across the Maya region.

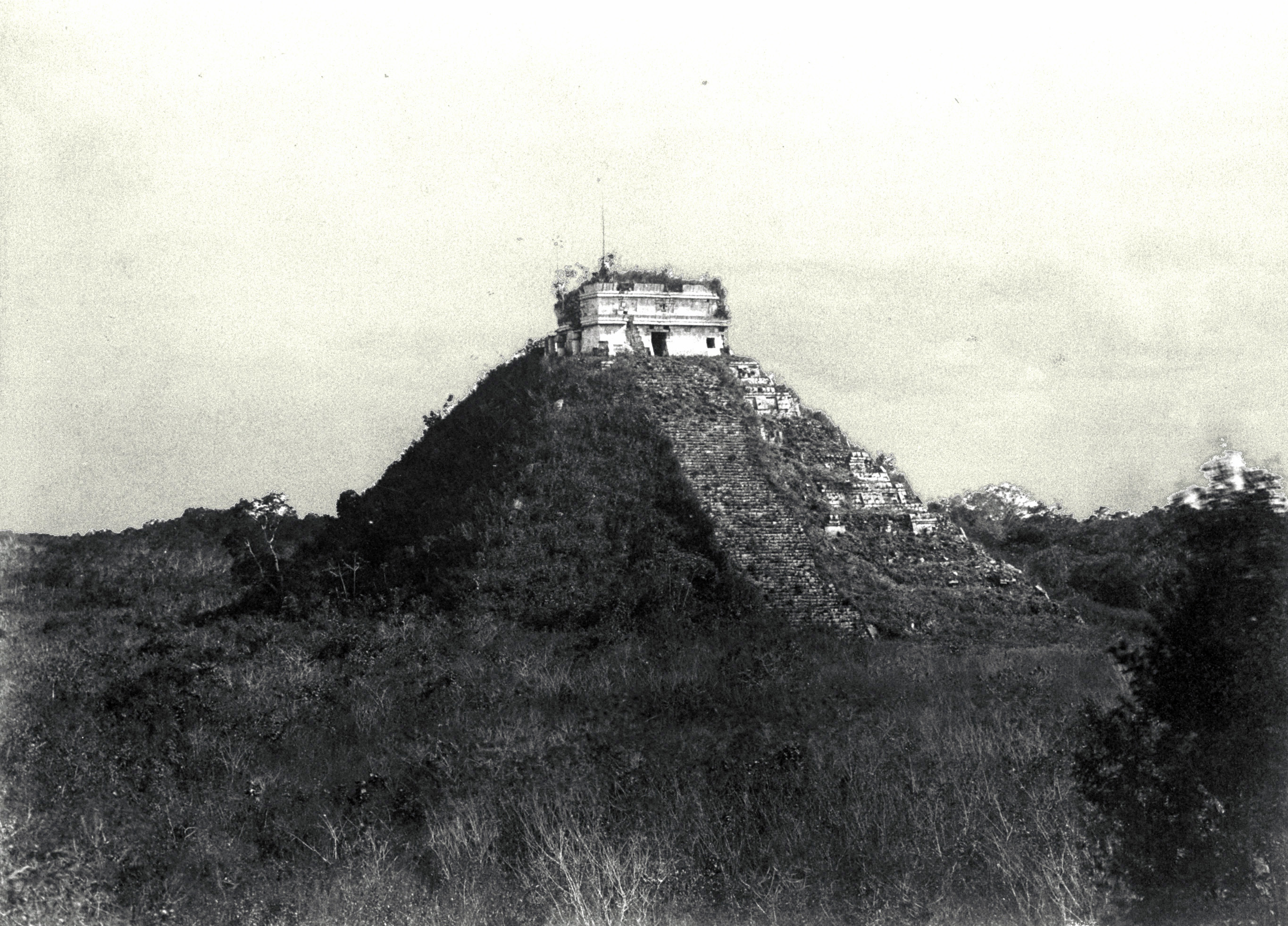
1892 photograph of the Castillo at Chichen Itza, by Teoberto Maler

In the 1960s, Mayanist J. Eric S. Thompson promoted the ideas that Maya cities were essentially vacant ceremonial centres serving a dispersed population in the forest, and that the Maya civilization was governed by peaceful astronomer-priests. These ideas began to collapse with major advances in the decipherment of the script in the late 20th century, pioneered by Heinrich Berlin, Tatiana Proskouriakoff, and Yuri Knorozov. With breakthroughs in understanding of Maya script since the 1950s, the texts revealed the warlike activities of the Classic Maya kings, undermining the view of the Maya as peaceful.

== Politics ==
Unlike the Aztecs and the Inca, the Maya political system never integrated the entire Maya cultural area into a single state or empire. Rather, throughout its history, the Maya area contained a varying mix of political complexity that included both states and chiefdoms. These polities fluctuated greatly in their relationships with each other and were engaged in a complex web of rivalries, periods of dominance or submission, vassalage, and alliances. At times, different polities achieved regional dominance, such as Calakmul, Caracol, Mayapan, and Tikal. The first reliably evidenced polities formed in the Maya lowlands in the 9th century BC.

During the Late Preclassic, the Maya political system coalesced into a theopolitical form, where elite ideology justified the ruler's authority, and was reinforced by public display, ritual, and religion. The divine king was the centre of political power, exercising ultimate control over administrative, economic, judicial, and military functions. The divine authority invested within the ruler was such that the king was able to mobilize both the aristocracy and commoners in executing huge infrastructure projects, apparently with no police force or standing army. Some polities engaged in a strategy of increasing administration, and filling administrative posts with loyal supporters rather than blood relatives. Within a polity, mid-ranking population centres would have played a key role in managing resources and internal conflict.

The Maya political landscape was highly complex and Maya elites engaged in political intrigue to gain economic and social advantage over neighbours. In the Late Classic, some cities established a long period of dominance over other large cities, such as the dominance of Caracol over Naranjo for half a century. In other cases, loose alliance networks were formed around a dominant city. Border settlements, usually located about halfway between neighbouring capitals, often switched allegiance over the course of their history, and at times acted independently. Dominant capitals exacted tribute in the form of luxury items from subjugated population centres. Political power was reinforced by military power, and the capture and humiliation of enemy warriors played an important part in elite culture. An overriding sense of pride and honour among the warrior aristocracy could lead to extended feuds and vendettas, which caused political instability and the fragmentation of polities.

== Society ==
From the Early Preclassic, Maya society was sharply divided between the elite and commoners. As population increased over time, various sectors of society became increasingly specialized, and political organization increasingly complex. By the Late Classic, when populations had grown enormously and hundreds of cities were connected in a complex web of political hierarchies, the wealthy segment of society multiplied. A middle class may have developed that included artisans, low ranking priests and officials, merchants, and soldiers. Commoners included farmers, servants, labourers, and slaves. According to indigenous histories, land was held communally by noble houses or clans. Such clans held that the land was the property of the ancestors, and ties between the land and the ancestors were reinforced by the burial of the dead within residential compounds.

=== King and court ===
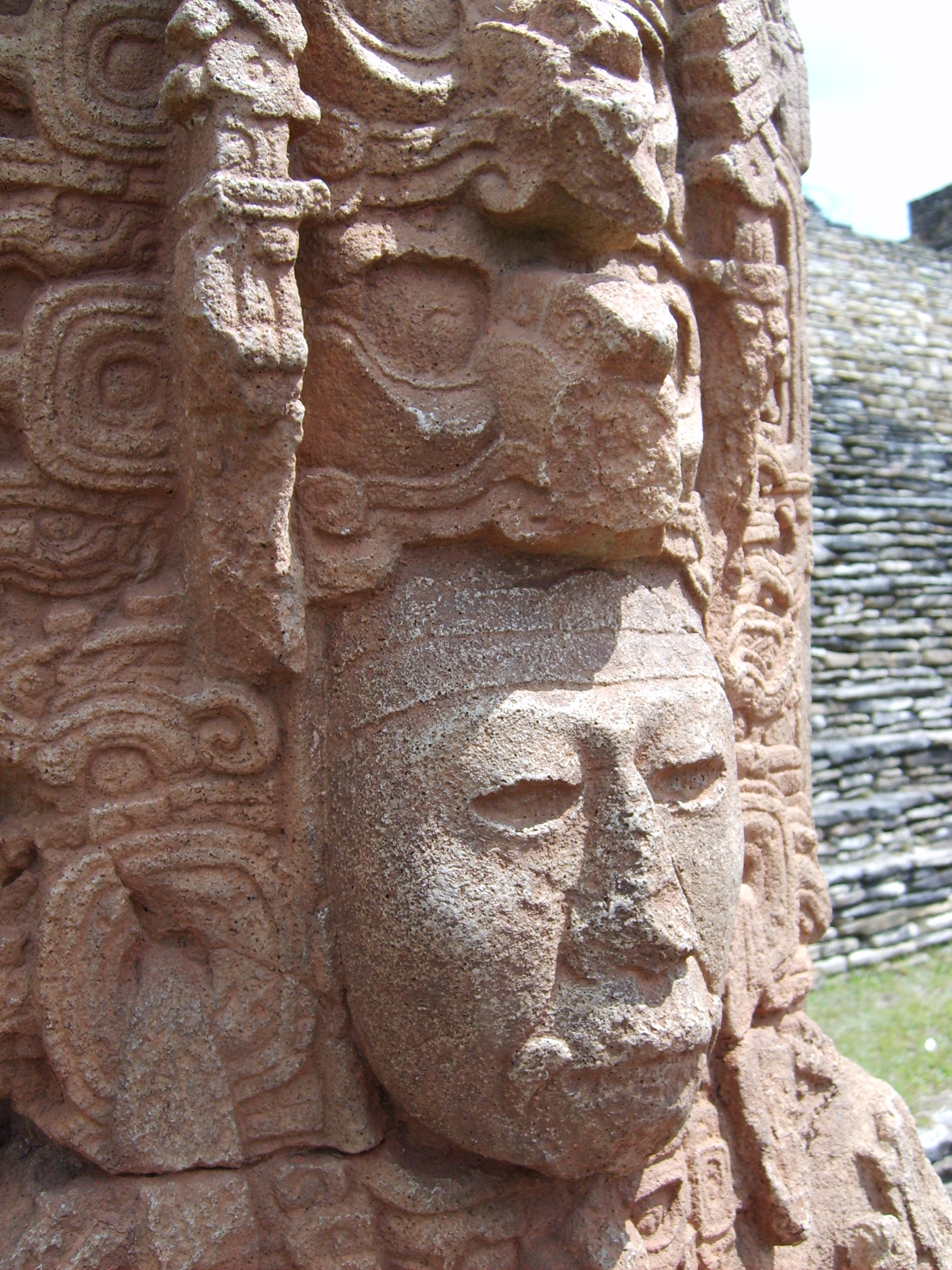
Stela from Toniná, representing the 6th-century king Bahlam Yaxuun Tihl

Classic Maya rule was centred in a royal culture that was displayed in all areas of Classic Maya art. The king was the supreme ruler and held a semi-divine status that made him the mediator between the mortal realm and that of the gods. From very early times, kings were specifically identified with the young maize god, whose gift of maize was the basis of Mesoamerican civilization. Maya royal succession was patrilineal, and royal power only passed to queens when doing otherwise would result in the extinction of the dynasty. Typically, power was passed to the eldest son. A young prince was called a chʼok ("youth"), although this word later came to refer to nobility in general. The royal heir was called bʼaah chʼok ("head youth"). Various points in the prince's childhood were marked by ritual; the most important was a bloodletting ceremony at age five or six. Although being of the royal bloodline was of utmost importance, the heir also had to be a successful war leader, as demonstrated by taking of captives. The enthronement of a new king was a highly elaborate ceremony, involving a series of separate acts that included enthronement upon a jaguar-skin cushion, human sacrifice, and receiving the symbols of royal power, such as a headband bearing a jade representation of the so-called "jester god", an elaborate headdress adorned with quetzal feathers, and a sceptre representing the god Kʼawiil.

Maya political administration, based around the royal court, was not bureaucratic in nature. Government was hierarchical, and official posts were sponsored by higher-ranking members of the aristocracy; officials tended to be promoted to higher levels of office over their lives. Officials are referred to as being "owned" by their sponsor, and this relationship continued even after the death of the sponsor. The Maya royal court was a vibrant and dynamic political institution. There was no universal structure for the Maya royal court, instead each polity formed a royal court that was suited to its own individual context. A number of royal and noble titles have been identified by epigraphers translating Classic Maya inscriptions. Ajaw is usually translated as "lord" or "king". In the Early Classic, an ajaw was the ruler of a city. Later, with increasing social complexity, the ajaw was a member of the ruling class and a major city could have more than one, each ruling over different districts. Paramount rulers distinguished themselves from the extended nobility by prefixing the word kʼuhul to their ajaw title. A kʼuhul ajaw was "divine lord", originally confined to the kings of the most prestigious and ancient royal lines. Kalomte was a royal title, whose exact meaning is not yet deciphered, but it was held only by the most powerful kings of the strongest dynasties. It indicated an overlord, or high king, and was only in use during the Classic period. By the Late Classic, the absolute power of the kʼuhul ajaw had weakened, and the political system had diversified to include a wider aristocracy, that by this time may well have expanded disproportionately.

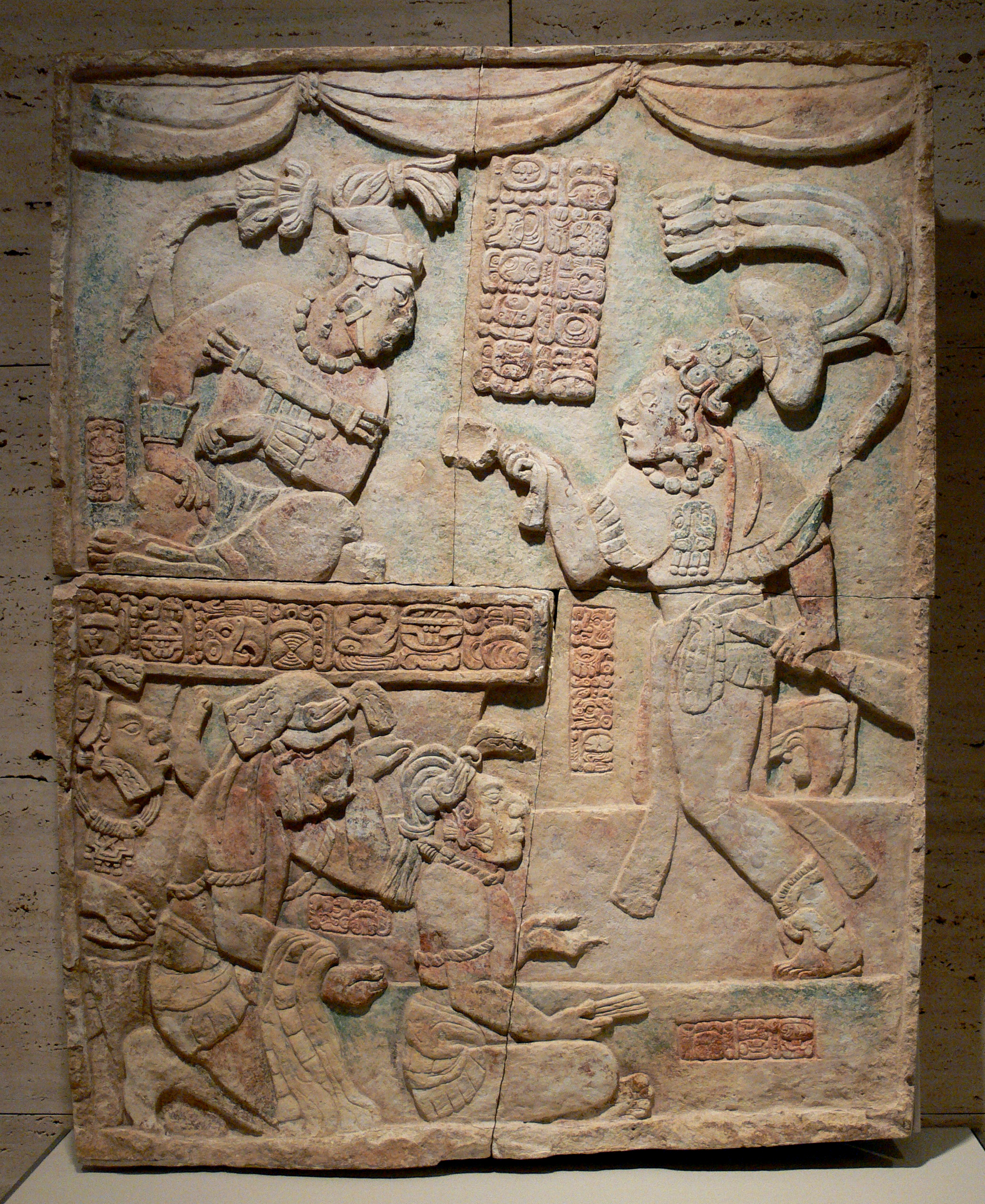
Classic period sculpture showing sajal Aj Chak Maax presenting captives before ruler Itzamnaaj Bʼalam III of Yaxchilan

A sajal was ranked below the ajaw, and indicated a subservient lord. A sajal would be lord of a second- or third-tier site, answering to an ajaw, who may himself have been subservient to a kalomte. A sajal would often be a war captain or regional governor, and inscriptions often link the sajal title to warfare; they are often mentioned as the holders of war captives. Sajal meant "feared one". The titles of ah tzʼihb and ah chʼul hun are both related to scribes. The ah tzʼihb was a royal scribe, usually a member of the royal family; the ah chʼul hun was the Keeper of the Holy Books, a title that is closely associated with the ajaw title, indicating that an ajaw always held the ah chʼul hun title simultaneously. Other courtly titles, the functions of which are not well understood, were yajaw kʼahk' ("Lord of Fire"), tiʼhuun and ti'sakhuun. These last two may be variations on the same title, and Mark Zender has suggested that the holder of this title may have been the spokesman for the ruler. Courtly titles are overwhelmingly male-oriented, and in those relatively rare occasions where they are applied to a woman, they appear to be used as honorifics for female royalty. Titled elites were often associated with particular structures in the hieroglyphic inscriptions of Classic period cities, indicating that such office holders either owned that structure, or that the structure was an important focus for their activities. A lakam, or standard-bearer, was possibly the only non-elite post-holder in the royal court. The lakam was only found in larger sites, and they appear to have been responsible for the taxation of local districts.

Different factions may have existed in the royal court. The kʼuhul ahaw and his household would have formed the central power-base, but other important groups were the priesthood, the warrior aristocracy, and other aristocratic courtiers. Where ruling councils existed, as at Chichen Itza and Copán, these may have formed an additional faction. Rivalry between different factions would have led to dynamic political institutions as compromises and disagreements were played out. In such a setting, public performance was vital. Such performances included ritual dances, presentation of war captives, offerings of tribute, human sacrifice, and religious ritual.

=== Commoners ===
Commoners are estimated to have comprised over 90% of the population, but relatively little is known about them. Their houses were generally constructed from perishable materials, and their remains have left little trace in the archaeological record. Some commoner dwellings were raised on low platforms, and these can be identified, but an unknown quantity of commoner houses were not. Such low-status dwellings can only be detected by extensive remote-sensing surveys of apparently empty terrain. The range of commoners was broad; it consisted of everyone not of noble birth, and therefore included everyone from the poorest farmers to wealthy craftsmen and commoners appointed to bureaucratic positions. Commoners engaged in essential production activities, including that of products destined for use by the elite, such as cotton and cacao, as well as subsistence crops for their own use, and utilitarian items such as ceramics and stone tools. Commoners took part in warfare, and could advance socially by proving themselves as outstanding warriors. Commoners paid taxes to the elite in the form of staple goods such as maize, flour and game. It is likely that hard-working commoners who displayed exceptional skills and initiative could become influential members of Maya society.

== Warfare ==
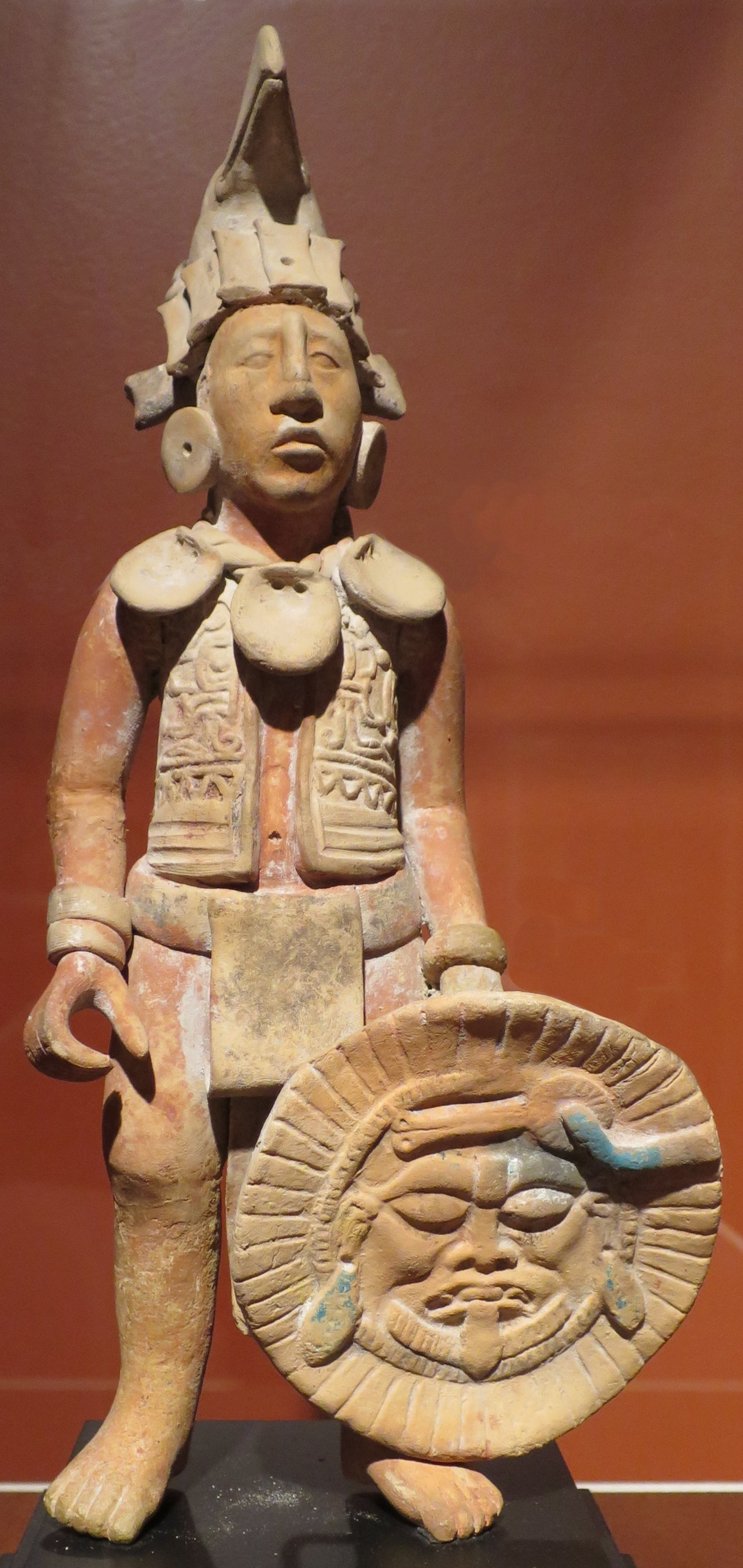
Jaina Island figurine representing a Classic period warrior

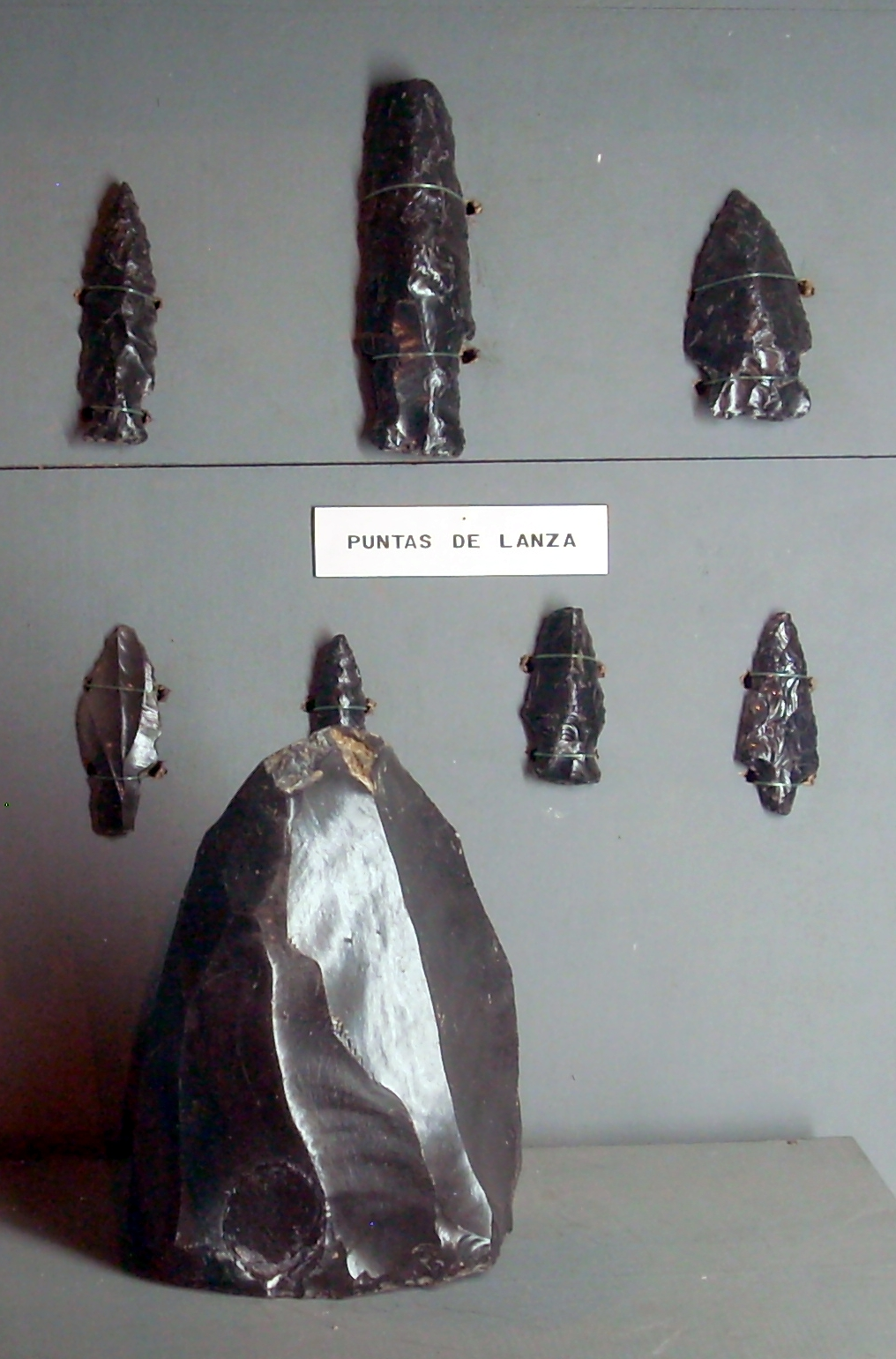
Obsidian spearheads with a lithic core, Takalik Abaj

Warfare was prevalent in the Maya world. Military campaigns were launched for a variety of reasons, including the control of trade routes and tribute, raids to take captives, scaling up to the complete destruction of an enemy state. Little is known about Maya military organization, logistics, or training. Warfare is depicted in Maya art from the Classic period, and wars and victories are mentioned in hieroglyphic inscriptions. Unfortunately, the inscriptions do not provide information upon the causes of war, or the form it took. In the 8th–9th centuries, intensive warfare resulted in the collapse of the kingdoms of the Petexbatún region of western Petén.

The rapid abandonment of Aguateca by its inhabitants has provided a rare opportunity to examine the remains of Maya weaponry in situ. Aguateca was stormed by unknown enemies around 810 AD, who overcame its formidable defences and burned the royal palace. The elite inhabitants of the city either fled or were captured, and never returned to collect their abandoned property. The inhabitants of the periphery abandoned the site soon after. This is an example of intensive warfare carried out by an enemy in order to eliminate a Maya state, rather than subjugate it. Research at Aguateca indicated that Classic period warriors were primarily members of the elite.

Maya warfare included both open battles and targeted raids. The frequent appearance of captives in records indicates that small targeted attacks were common, often deliberately planned on holidays or celebrations to catch the enemy off guard. These raids relied on speed, surprise, and rapid withdrawal rather than prolonged battles.

From as early as the Preclassic period, the ruler of a Maya polity was expected to be a distinguished war leader, and was depicted with trophy heads hanging from his belt. In the Classic period, such trophy heads no longer appeared on the king's belt, but Classic period kings are frequently depicted standing over humiliated war captives. Right up to the end of the Postclassic period, Maya kings led as war captains. Maya inscriptions from the Classic show that a defeated king could be captured, tortured, and sacrificed. The Spanish recorded that Maya leaders kept track of troop movements in painted books.

The outcome of a successful military campaign could vary in its impact on the defeated polity. In some cases, entire cities were sacked, and never resettled, as at Aguateca. In other instances, the victors would seize the defeated rulers, their families, and patron gods. The captured nobles and their families could be imprisoned, or sacrificed. At the least severe end of the scale, the defeated polity would be obliged to pay tribute to the victor.

=== Warriors ===
During the Contact period, certain military positions were held by members of the aristocracy, and were passed on by patrilineal succession. It is likely that the specialized knowledge inherent in the particular military role was taught to the successor, including strategy, ritual, and war dances. Maya armies of the Contact period were highly disciplined, and warriors participated in regular training exercises and drills; every able-bodied adult male was available for military service. Maya states did not maintain standing armies; warriors were mustered by local officials who reported back to appointed warleaders. There were also units of full-time mercenaries who followed permanent leaders. Most warriors were not full-time, however, and were primarily farmers; the needs of their crops usually came before warfare. Maya warfare was not so much aimed at destruction of the enemy as the seizure of captives and plunder.

There is some evidence from the Classic period that women provided supporting roles in war, but they did not act as military officers with the exception of those rare ruling queens. By the Postclassic, the native chronicles suggest that women occasionally fought in battle.

=== Weapons ===
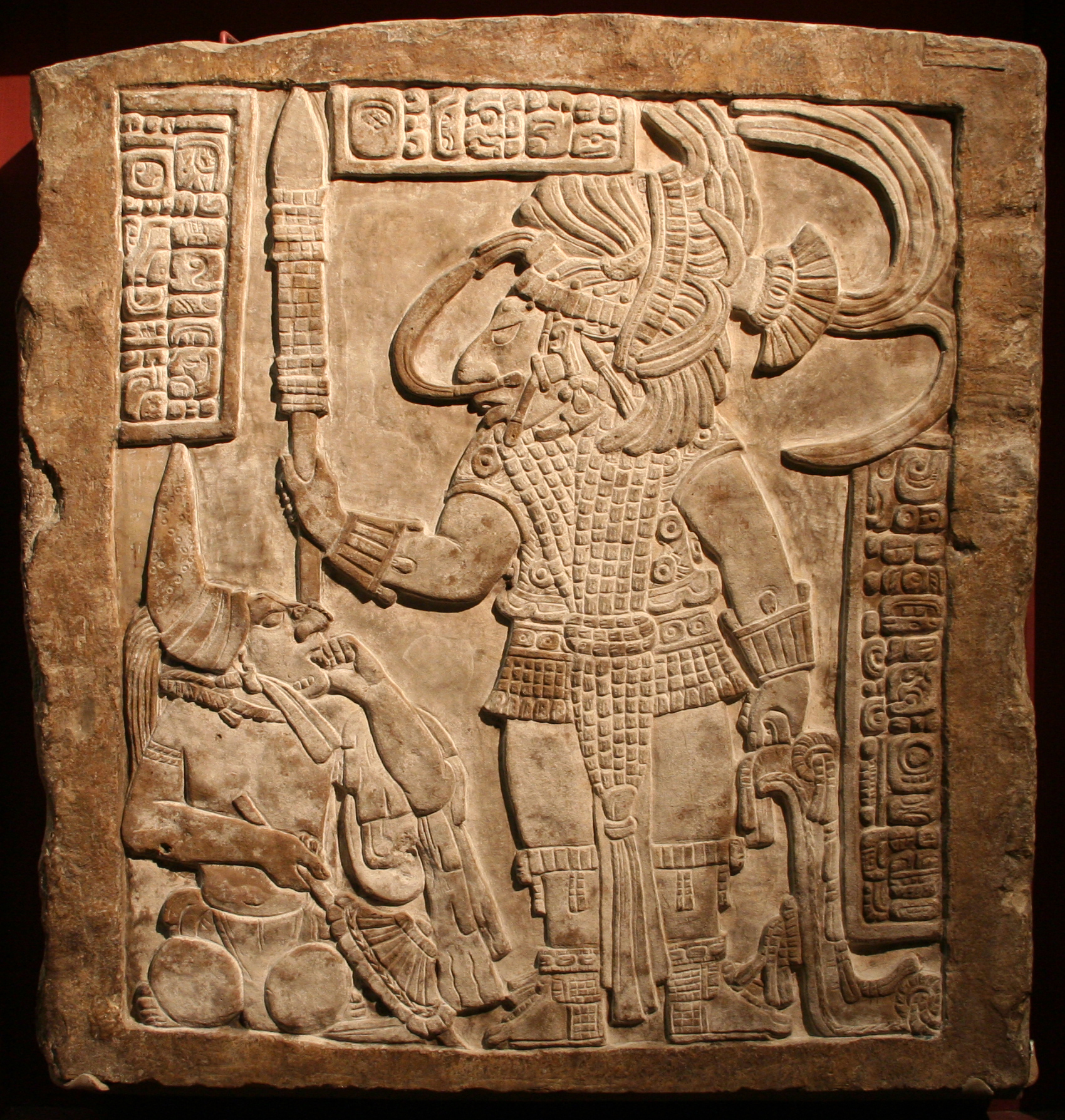
Lintel 16 from Yaxchilán, depicting king Yaxun Bʼalam in warrior garb

The atlatl (spear-thrower) was introduced to the Maya region by Teotihuacan in the Early Classic. This was a 0.5-metre-long (1.6 ft) stick with a notched end to hold a dart or javelin. The stick was used to launch the missile with more force and accuracy than simply hurling it with the arm. Maya warfare did include this, but was mostly fought at close range. Evidence in the form of stone blade points recovered from Aguateca indicate that darts and spears were the primary weapons of the Classic Maya warrior. Commoners used blowguns in war, which also served as their hunting weapon. The bow and arrow was used by the ancient Maya for both war and hunting. Although present in the Maya region during the Classic period, its use as a weapon of war was not favoured; it did not become a common weapon until the Postclassic. The Contact period Maya also used two-handed swords crafted from strong wood with the blade fashioned from inset obsidian, similar to the Aztec macuahuitl. Maya warriors wore body armour in the form of quilted cotton that had been soaked in salt water to toughen it; the resulting armour compared favourably to the steel armour worn by the Spanish when they conquered the region. Warriors bore wooden or animal hide shields decorated with feathers and animal skins.

== Trade ==
Map of Maya and Aztec trade routes in 1519

Trade was a key component of Maya society, and in the development of the Maya civilization. The cities that grew to become the most important usually controlled access to vital trade goods, or portage routes. Cities such as Kaminaljuyu and Qʼumarkaj in the Guatemalan Highlands, and Chalchuapa in El Salvador, variously controlled access to the sources of obsidian at different points in Maya history. The Maya were major producers of cotton, which was used to make the textiles to be traded throughout Mesoamerica. The most important cities in the northern Yucatán Peninsula controlled access to the sources of salt. In the Postclassic, the Maya engaged in a flourishing slave trade with wider Mesoamerica.

The Maya engaged in long-distance trade across the Maya region, and across greater Mesoamerica and beyond. As an illustration, an Early Classic Maya merchant quarter has been identified at the distant metropolis of Teotihuacan, in central Mexico. Within Mesoamerica beyond the Maya area, trade routes particularly focused on central Mexico and the Gulf coast. In the Early Classic, Chichen Itza was at the hub of an extensive trade network that imported gold discs from Colombia and Panama, and turquoise from Los Cerrillos, New Mexico. Long-distance trade of both luxury and utilitarian goods was probably controlled by the royal family. Prestige goods obtained by trade were used both for consumption by the city's ruler, and as luxury gifts to consolidate the loyalty of vassals and allies.

Trade routes not only supplied physical goods, they facilitated the movement of people and ideas throughout Mesoamerica. Shifts in trade routes occurred with the rise and fall of important cities in the Maya region, and have been identified in every major reorganization of the Maya civilization, such as the rise of Preclassic Maya civilization, the transition to the Classic, and the Terminal Classic collapse. Even the Spanish Conquest did not immediately terminate all Maya trading activity; for example, the Contact period Manche Chʼol traded the prestige crops of cacao, annatto and vanilla into colonial Verapaz.

=== Merchants ===
Little is known of Maya merchants, although they are depicted on Maya ceramics in elaborate noble dress, so at least some were members of the elite. During the Contact period, Maya nobility took part in long-distance trading expeditions. The majority of traders were middle class, but were largely engaged in local and regional trade rather than the prestigious long-distance trading that was the preserve of the elite. The travelling of merchants into dangerous foreign territory was likened to a passage through the underworld; the patron deities of merchants were two underworld gods carrying backpacks. When merchants travelled, they painted themselves black, like their patron gods, and went heavily armed.

The Maya had no pack animals, so all trade goods were carried on the backs of porters when going overland; if the trade route followed a river or the coast, then goods were transported in canoes. A substantial Maya trading canoe made from a large hollowed-out tree trunk was encountered off Honduras on Christopher Columbus's fourth voyage. The canoe was 2.5 metres (8.2 ft) broad and was powered by 25 rowers. Trade goods carried included cacao, obsidian, ceramics, textiles, and copper bells and axes. Cacao was used as currency (although not exclusively), and its value was such that counterfeiting occurred by removing the flesh from the pod, and stuffing it with dirt or avocado rind.

=== Marketplaces ===
Marketplaces are difficult to identify archaeologically. However, the Spanish reported a thriving market economy when they arrived in the region. At some Classic period cities, archaeologists have tentatively identified formal arcade-style masonry architecture and parallel alignments of scattered stones as the permanent foundations of market stalls. A 2007 study compared soils from a modern Guatemalan market to a proposed ancient market at Chunchucmil; unusually high levels of zinc and phosphorus at both sites indicated similar food production and vegetable sales activity. The calculated density of market stalls at Chunchucmil strongly suggests that a thriving market economy already existed in the Early Classic. Archaeologists have tentatively identified marketplaces at an increasing number of Maya cities by means of a combination of archaeology and soil analysis. When the Spanish arrived, Postclassic cities in the highlands had markets in permanent plazas, with officials on hand to settle disputes, enforce rules, and collect taxes.

== Art ==
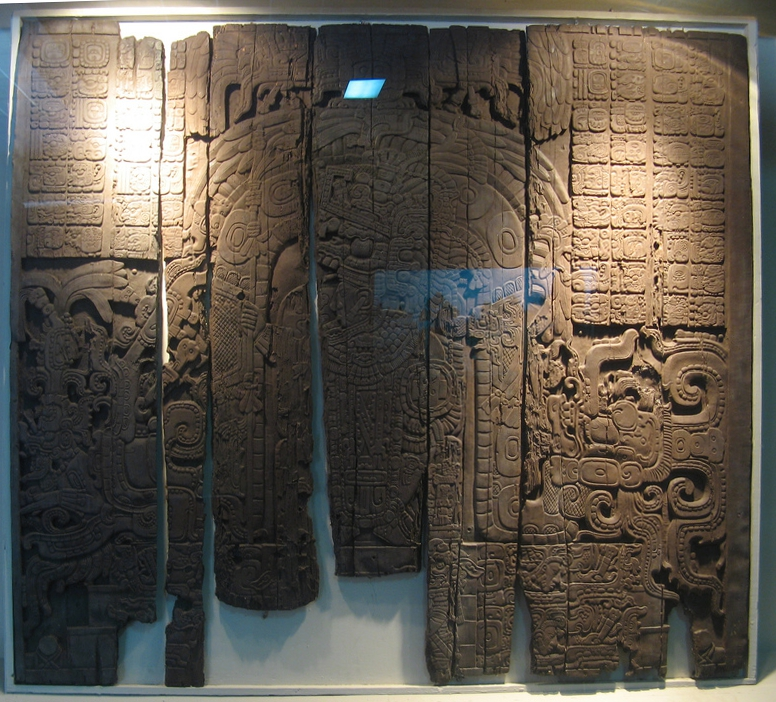
The elaborately carved wooden Lintel 3 from Tikal Temple IV. It celebrates a military victory by Yikʼin Chan Kʼawiil in 743.

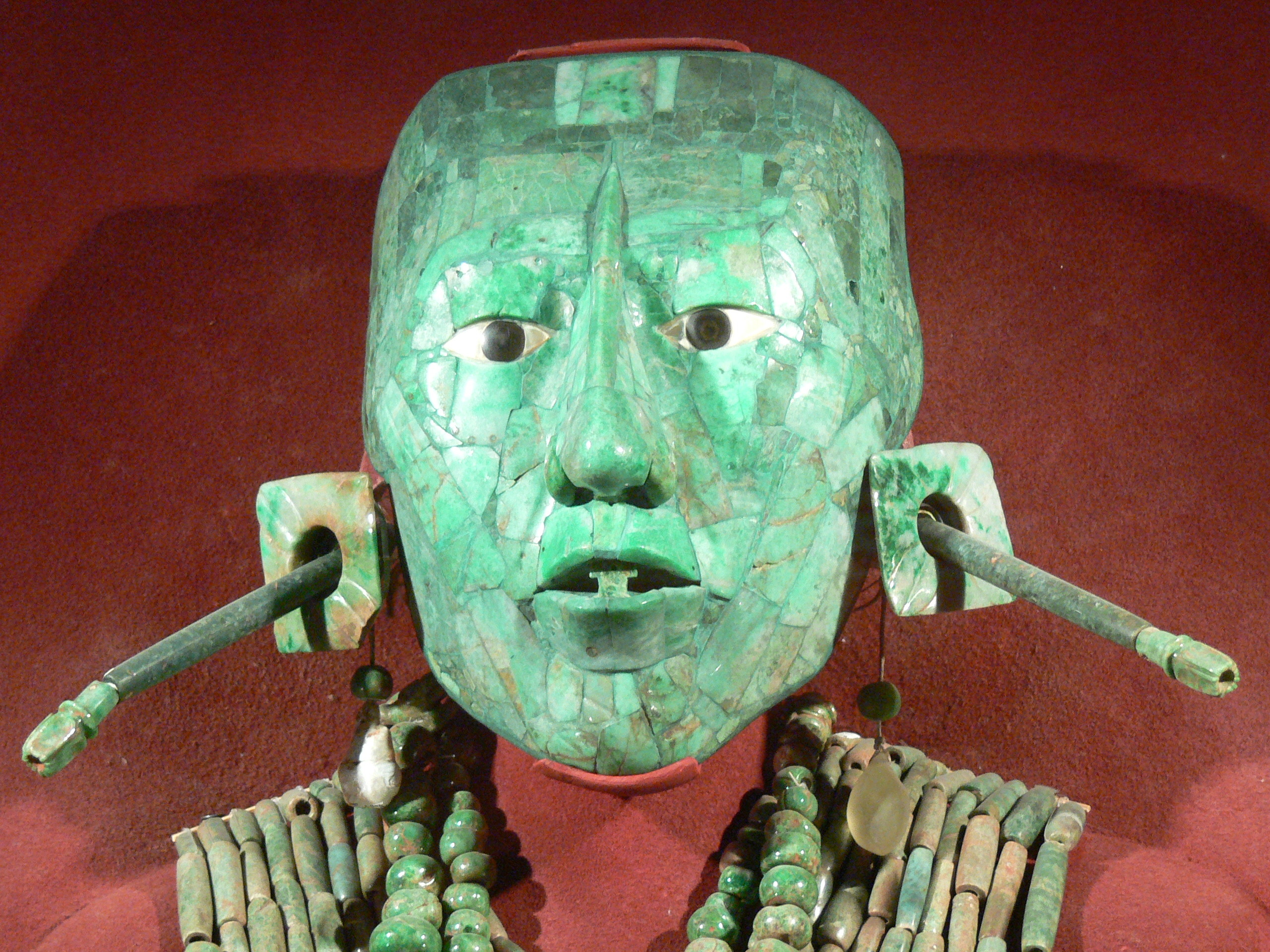
Jade funerary mask of king Kʼinich Janaabʼ Pakal

Maya art is essentially the art of the royal court. It is almost exclusively concerned with the Maya elite and their world. Maya art was crafted from both perishable and non-perishable materials, and served to link the Maya to their ancestors. Although surviving Maya art represents only a small proportion of the art that the Maya created, it represents a wider variety of subjects than any other art tradition in the Americas. Maya art has many regional styles, and is unique in the ancient Americas in bearing narrative text. The finest surviving Maya art dates to the Late Classic period.

The Maya exhibited a preference for the colour green or blue-green, and used the same word for the colours blue and green. Correspondingly, they placed high value on apple-green jade, and other greenstones, associating them with the sun-god Kʼinich Ajau. They sculpted artefacts that included fine tesserae and beads, to carved heads weighing 4.42 kilograms (9.7 lb). The Maya nobility practised dental modification, and some lords wore encrusted jade in their teeth. Mosaic funerary masks could also be fashioned from jade, such as that of Kʼinich Janaabʼ Pakal, king of Palenque.

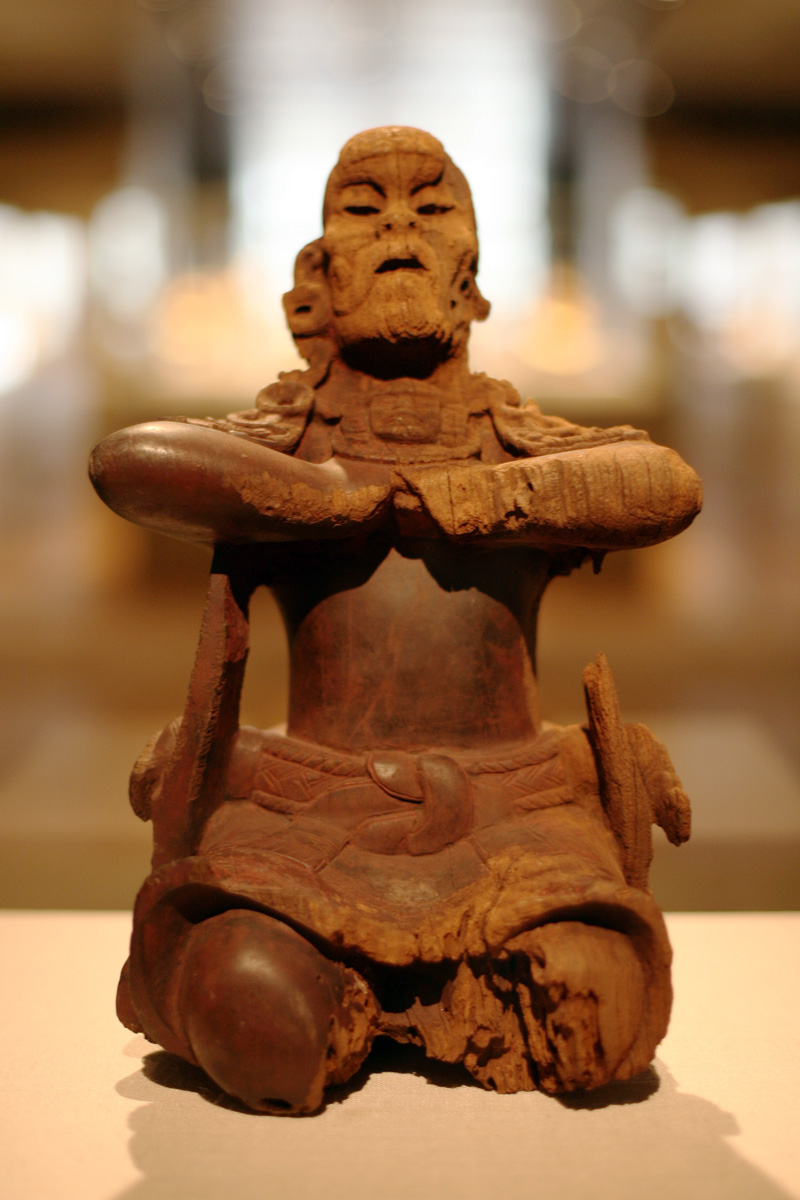
Early Classic wooden figurine, it may once have supported a mirror.

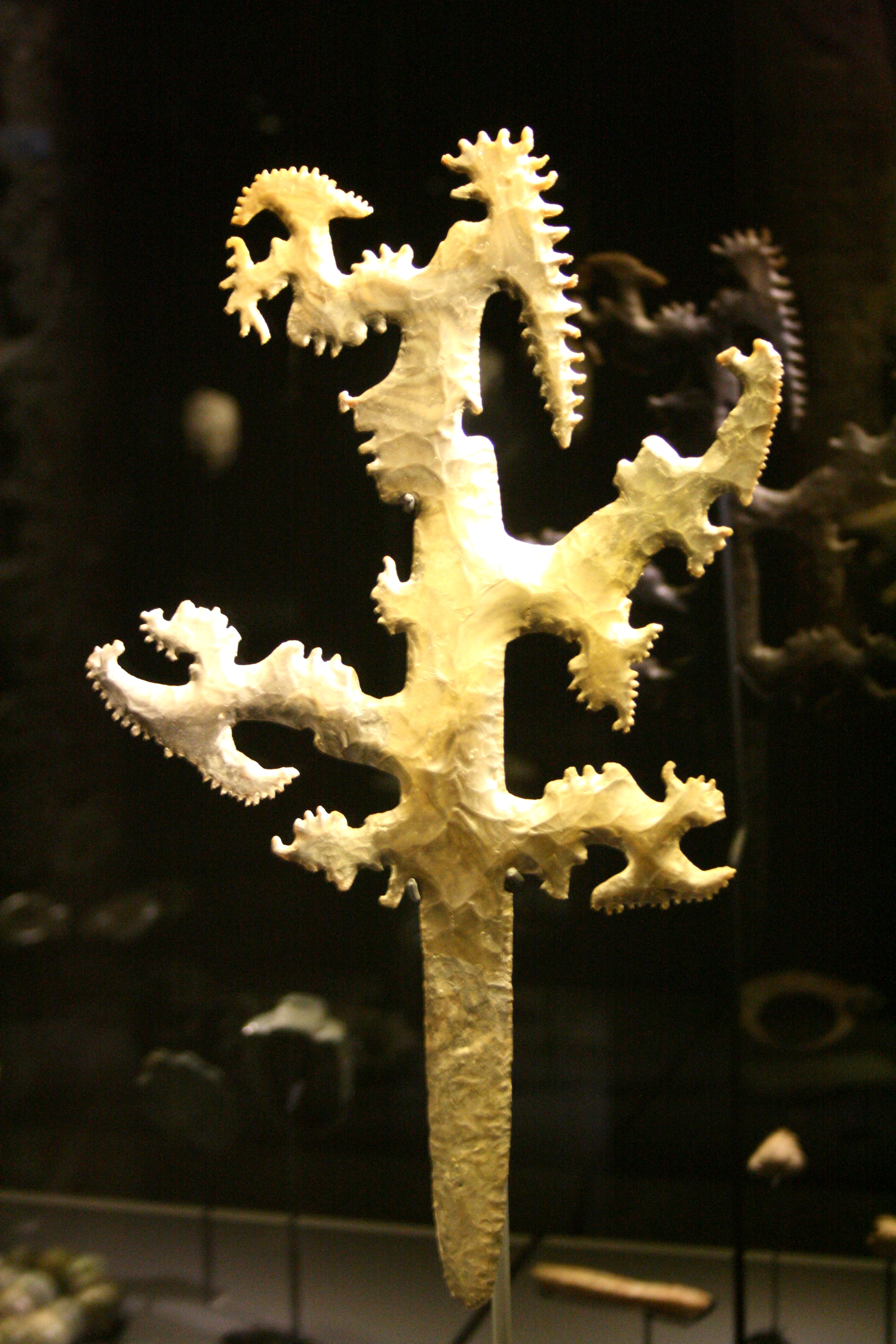
Eccentric flint in the Musées Royaux d'art et d'Histoire, Brussels

Maya stone sculpture emerged into the archaeological record as a fully developed tradition, suggesting that it may have evolved from a tradition of sculpting wood. Because of the biodegradability of wood, the corpus of Maya woodwork has almost entirely disappeared. The few wooden artefacts that have survived include three-dimensional sculptures, and hieroglyphic panels. Stone Maya stelae are widespread in city sites, often paired with low, circular stones referred to as altars in the literature. Stone sculpture also took other forms, such as the limestone relief panels at Palenque and Piedras Negras. At Yaxchilan, Dos Pilas, Copán, and other sites, stone stairways were decorated with sculpture. The hieroglyphic stairway at Copán comprises the longest surviving Maya hieroglyphic text, and consists of 2,200 individual glyphs.

The largest Maya sculptures consisted of architectural façades crafted from stucco. The rough form was laid out on a plain plaster base coating on the wall, and the three-dimensional form was built up using small stones. Finally, this was coated with stucco and moulded into the finished form; human body forms were first modelled in stucco, with their costumes added afterwards. The final stucco sculpture was then brightly painted. Giant stucco masks were used to adorn temple façades by the Late Preclassic, and such decoration continued into the Classic period.

The Maya had a long tradition of mural painting; rich polychrome murals have been excavated at San Bartolo, dating to between 300 and 200 BC. Walls were coated with plaster, and polychrome designs were painted onto the smooth finish. The majority of such murals have not survived, but Early Classic tombs painted in cream, red, and black have been excavated at Caracol, Río Azul, and Tikal. Among the best preserved murals are a full-size series of Late Classic paintings at Bonampak.

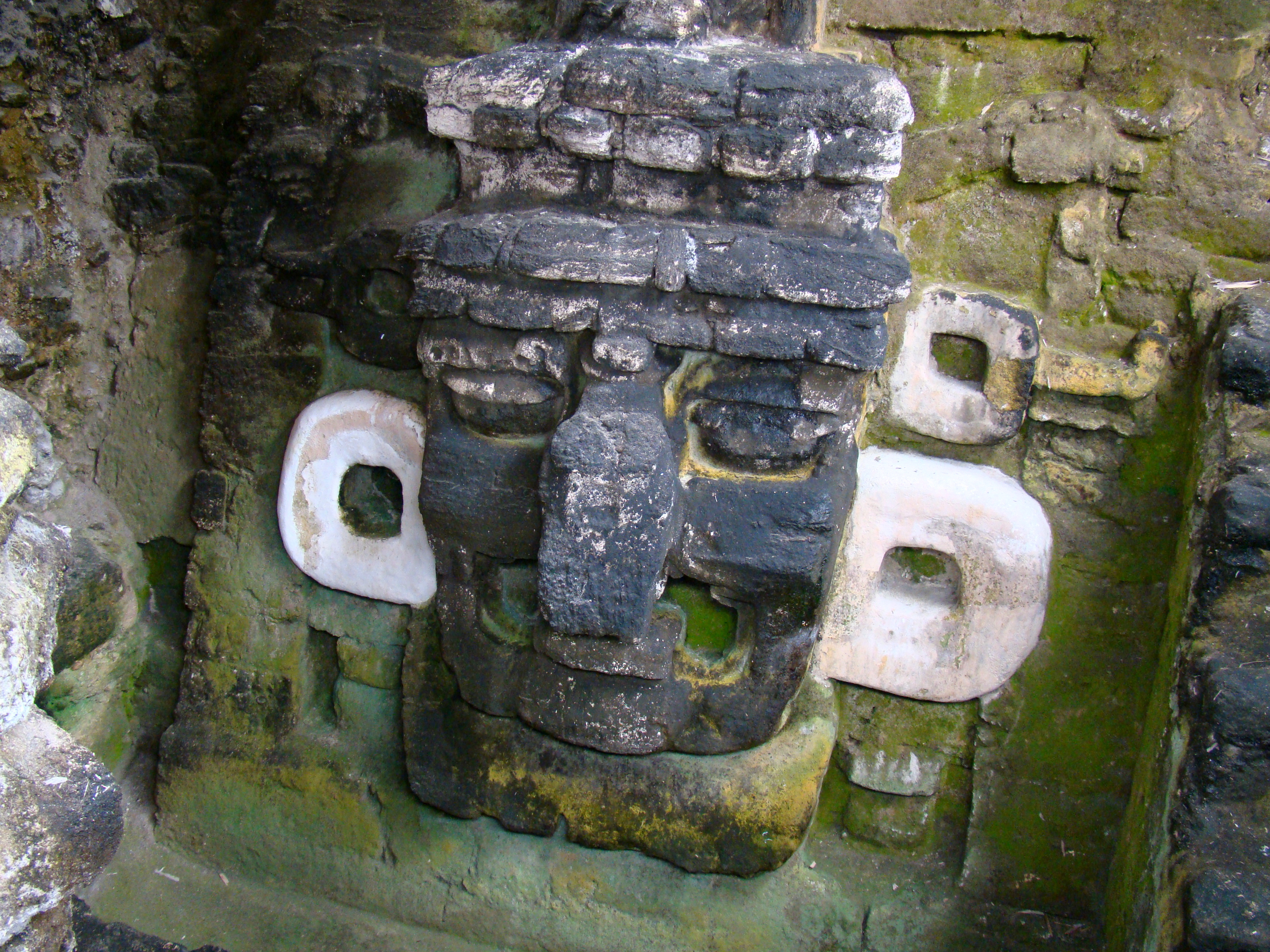
Stucco mask adorning the Early Classic substructure of Tikal Temple 33

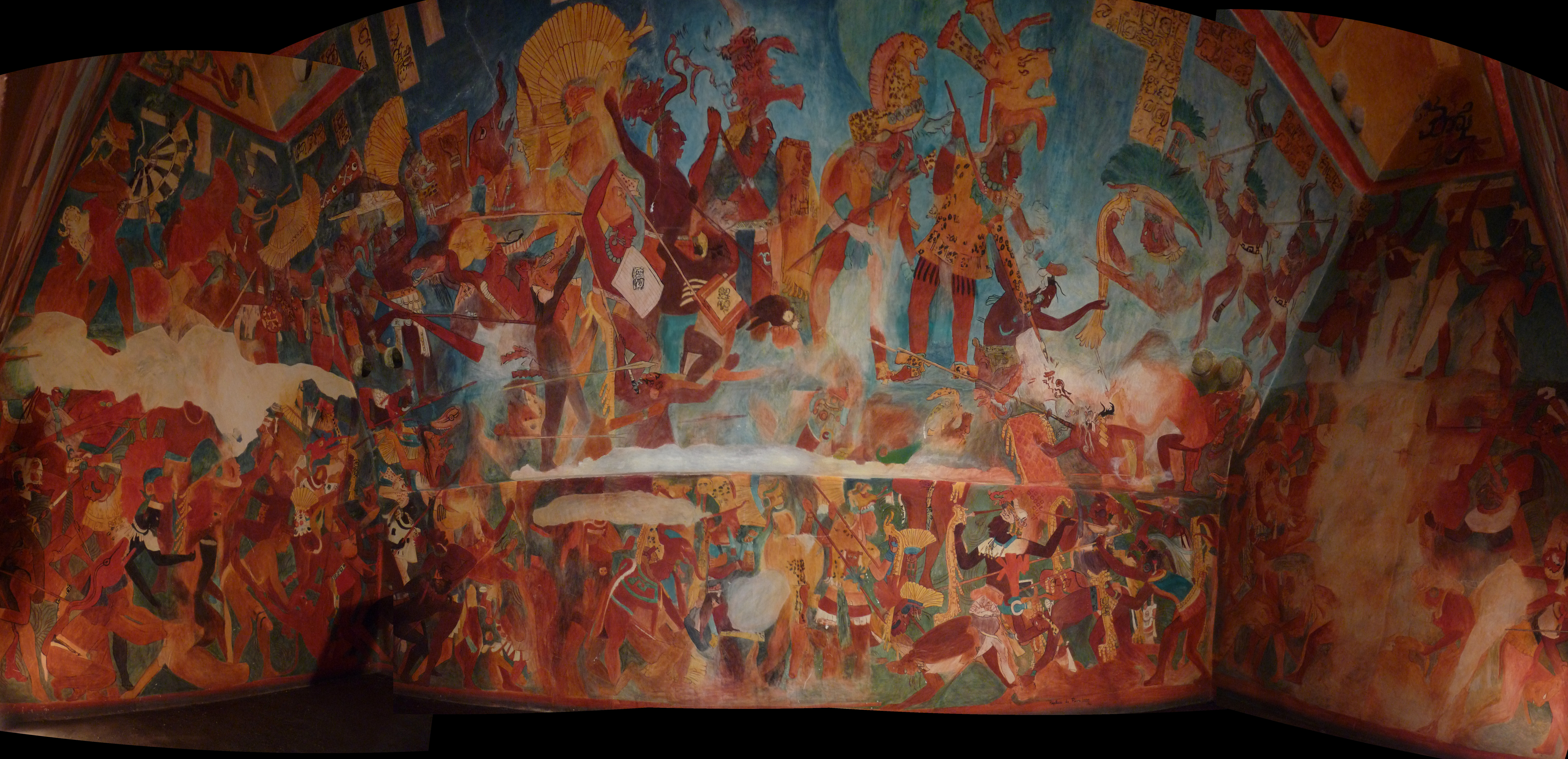
Reproduction of the Late Classic painted mural at Bonampak, depicting a Mayan battle scene

Flint, chert, and obsidian all served utilitarian purposes in Maya culture, but many pieces were finely crafted into forms that were never intended to be used as tools. Eccentric flints are among the finest lithic artefacts produced by the ancient Maya. They were technically very challenging to produce, requiring considerable skill on the part of the artisan. Large obsidian eccentrics can measure over 30 centimetres (12 in) in length. Their actual form varies considerably but they generally depict human, animal and geometric forms associated with Maya religion. Eccentric flints show a great variety of forms, such as crescents, crosses, snakes, and scorpions. The largest and most elaborate examples display multiple human heads, with minor heads sometimes branching off from larger one.

Maya textiles are very poorly represented in the archaeological record, although by comparison with other pre-Columbian cultures, such as the Aztecs and the Andean region, it is likely that they were high-value items. Scraps of textile have been recovered, but the best evidence for textile art is where they are represented in other media, such as painted murals or ceramics. Such secondary representations show the elite of the Maya court adorned with sumptuous cloths, generally these would have been cotton, but jaguar pelts and deer hides are also shown.

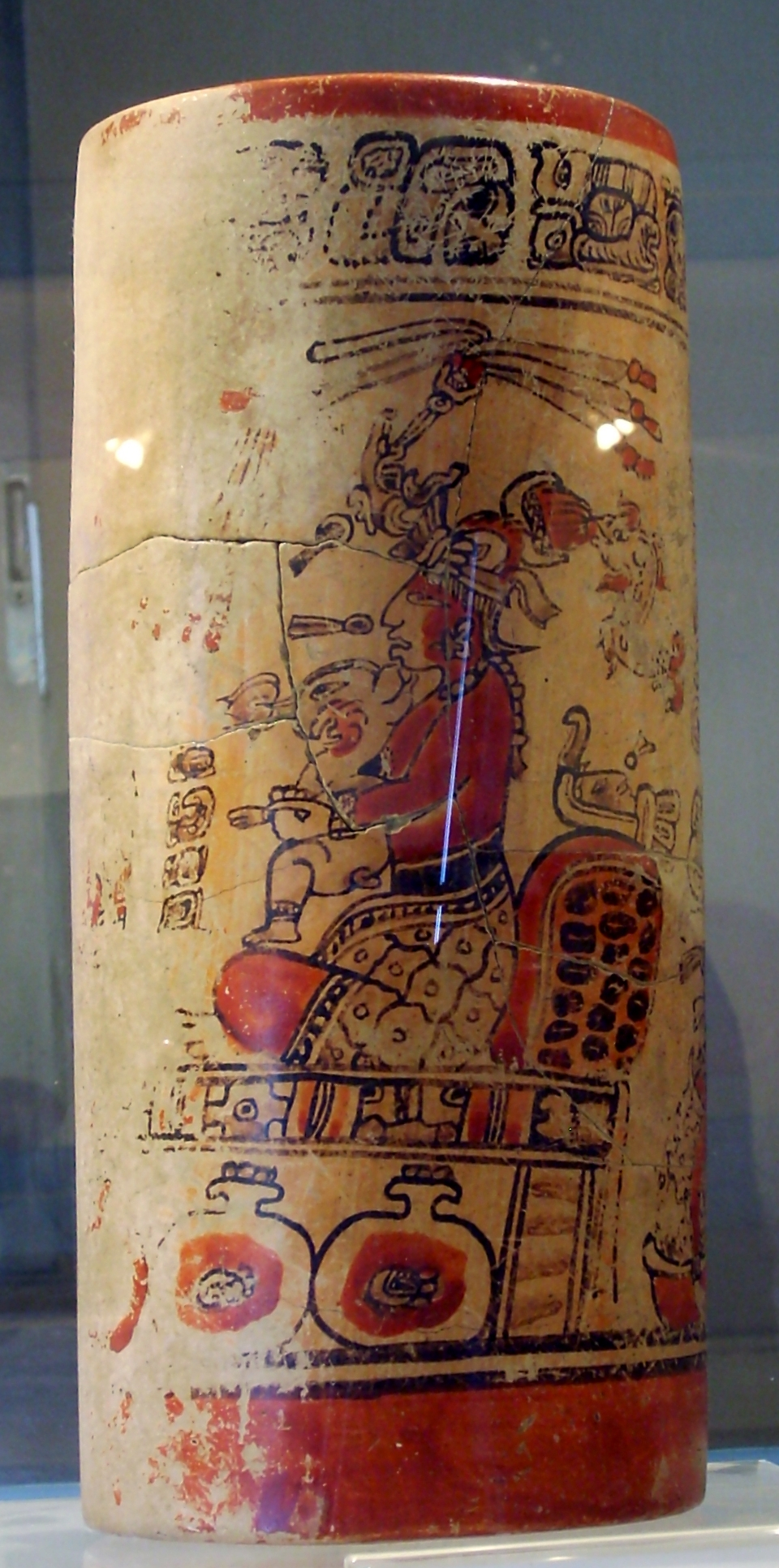
Painted ceramic vessel from Sacul

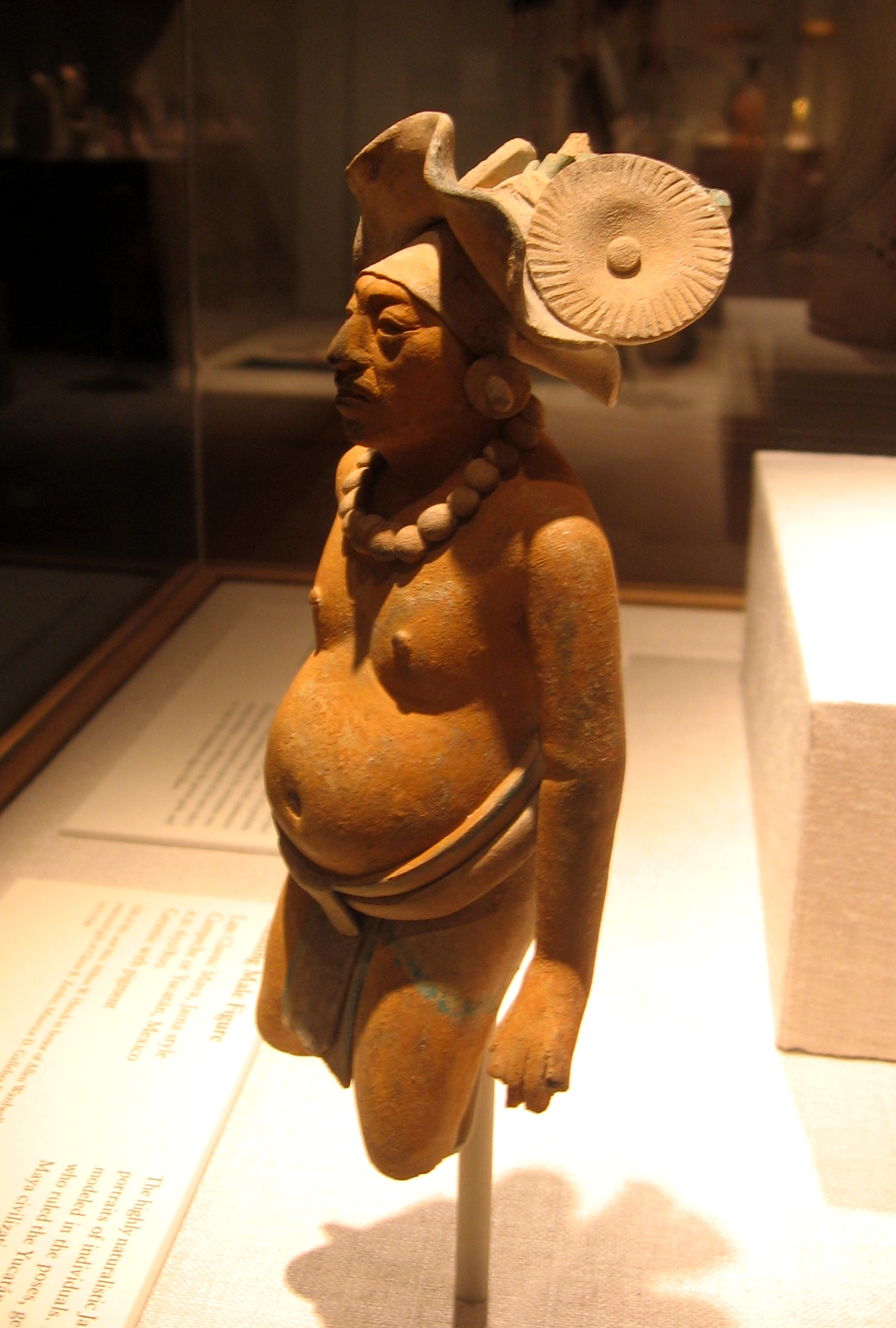
Ceramic figurine from Jaina Island, AD 650–800

Ceramics are the most commonly surviving type of Maya art. The Maya had no knowledge of the potter's wheel, and Maya vessels were built up by coiling rolled strips of clay into the desired form. Maya pottery was not glazed, although it often had a fine finish produced by burnishing. Maya ceramics were painted with clay slips blended with minerals and coloured clays. Ancient Maya firing techniques have yet to be replicated. A quantity of extremely fine ceramic figurines have been excavated from Late Classic tombs on Jaina Island, in northern Yucatán. They stand from 10 to 25 centimetres (3.9 to 9.8 in) high and were hand modelled, with exquisite detail. The Ik-style polychrome ceramic corpus, including finely painted plates and cylindrical vessels, originated in Late Classic Motul de San José. It includes a set of features such as hieroglyphs painted in a pink or pale red colour and scenes with dancers wearing masks. One of the most distinctive features is the realistic representation of subjects as they appeared in life. The subject matter of the vessels includes courtly life from the Petén region in the 8th century AD, such as diplomatic meetings, feasting, bloodletting, scenes of warriors and the sacrifice of prisoners of war.

Bone, both human and animal, was also sculpted; human bones may have been trophies, or relics of ancestors. The Maya valued Spondylus shells, and worked them to remove the white exterior and spines, to reveal the fine orange interior. Around the 10th century AD, metallurgy arrived in Mesoamerica from South America, and the Maya began to make small objects in gold, silver and copper. The Maya generally hammered sheet metal into objects such as beads, bells, and discs. In the last centuries before the Spanish Conquest, the Maya began to use the lost-wax method to cast small metal pieces.

One poorly studied area of Maya folk art is graffiti. Additional graffiti, not part of the planned decoration, was incised into the stucco of interior walls, floors, and benches, in a wide variety of buildings, including temples, residences, and storerooms. Graffiti has been recorded at 51 Maya sites, particularly clustered in the Petén Basin and southern Campeche, and the Chenes region of northwestern Yucatán. At Tikal, where a great quantity of graffiti has been recorded, the subject matter includes drawings of temples, people, deities, animals, banners, litters, and thrones. Graffiti was often inscribed haphazardly, with drawings overlapping each other, and display a mix of crude, untrained art, and examples by artists familiar with Classic-period artistic conventions.

== Architecture ==
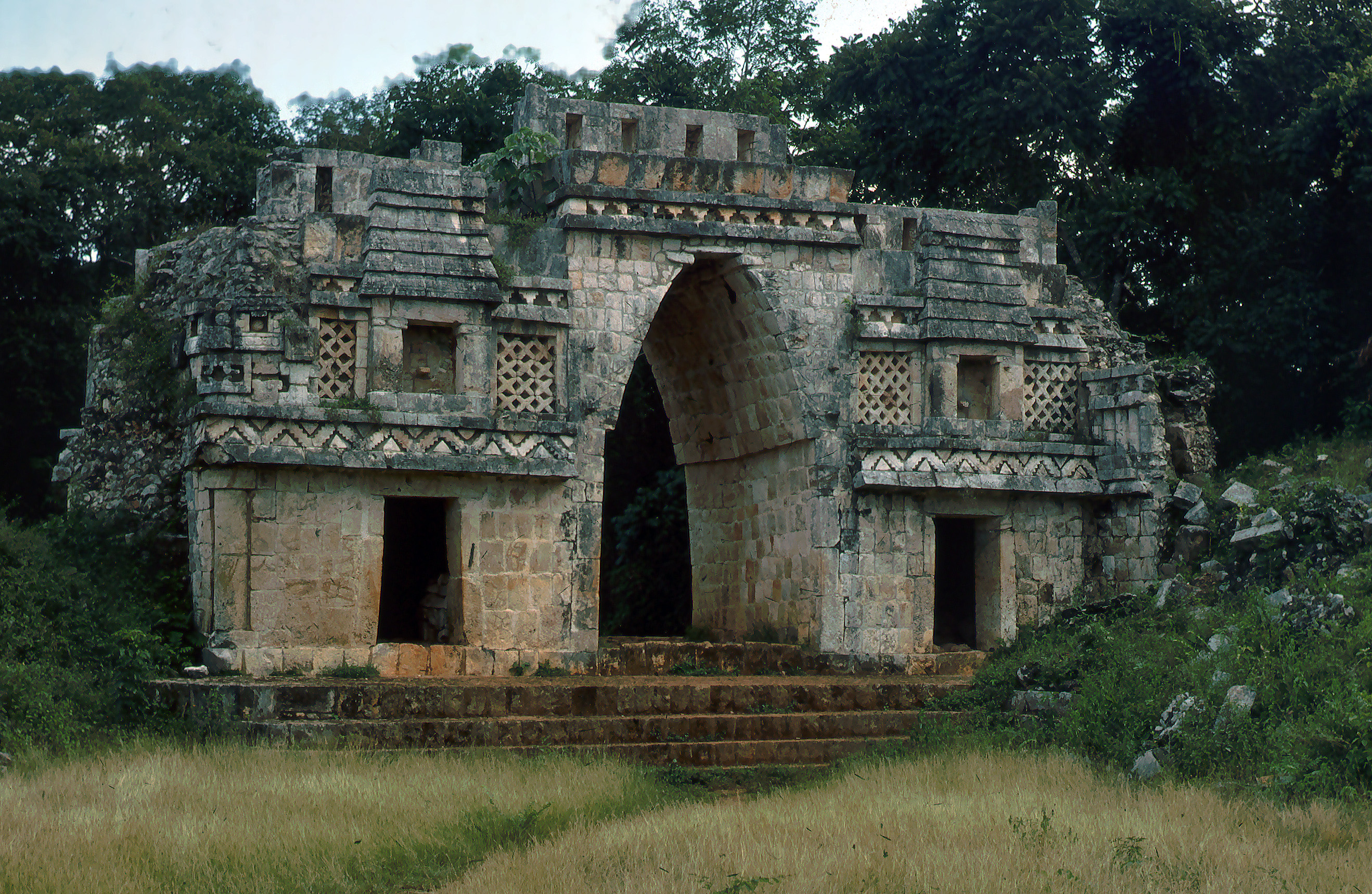
The Puuc-style Labna gateway. The passage is formed by a corbel arch, a common element in Maya architecture.

The Maya produced a vast array of structures, and have left an extensive architectural legacy. Maya architecture also incorporates various art forms and hieroglyphic texts. Masonry architecture built by the Maya evidences craft specialization in Maya society, centralized organization and the political means to mobilize a large workforce. It is estimated that a large elite residence at Copán required an estimated 10,686 man-days to build, which compares to 67-man-days for a commoner's hut. It is further estimated that 65% of the labour required to build the noble residence was used in the quarrying, transporting, and finishing of the stone used in construction, and 24% of the labour was required for the manufacture and application of limestone-based plaster. Altogether, it is estimated that two to three months were required for the construction of the residence for this single noble at Copán, using between 80 and 130 full-time labourers. A Classic-period city like Tikal was spread over 20 square kilometres (7.7 sq mi), with an urban core covering 6 square kilometres (2.3 sq mi). The labour required to build such a city was immense, running into many millions of man-days. The most massive structures ever erected by the Maya were built during the Preclassic period. Craft specialization would have required dedicated stonemasons and plasterers by the Late Preclassic, and would have required planners and architects.

=== Urban design ===
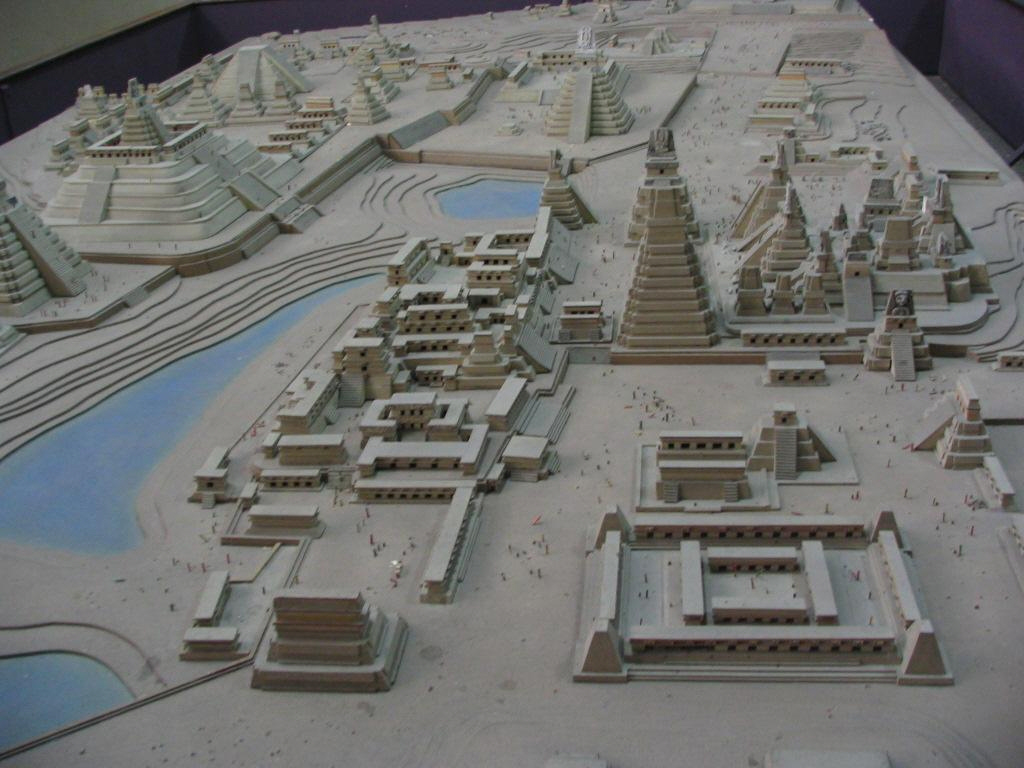
Reconstruction of the urban core of Tikal in the 8th century AD

Maya cities were not formally planned, and were subject to irregular expansion, with the haphazard addition of palaces, temples and other buildings. Most Maya cities tended to grow outwards from the core, and upwards as new structures were superimposed upon preceding architecture. Maya cities usually had a ceremonial and administrative centre surrounded by a vast irregular sprawl of residential complexes. The centres of all Maya cities featured sacred precincts, sometimes separated from nearby residential areas by walls. These precincts contained pyramid temples and other monumental architecture dedicated to elite activities, such as basal platforms that supported administrative or elite residential complexes. Sculpted monuments were raised to record the deeds of the ruling dynasty. City centres also featured plazas, sacred ballcourts and buildings used for marketplaces and schools. Frequently causeways linked the centre to outlying areas of the city. Some of these classes of architecture formed lesser groups in the outlying areas of the city, which served as sacred centres for non-royal lineages. The areas adjacent to these sacred compounds included residential complexes housing wealthy lineages. The largest and richest of these elite compounds sometimes possessed sculpture and art of craftsmanship equal to that of royal art.

The ceremonial centre of the Maya city was where the ruling elite lived, and where the administrative functions of the city were performed, together with religious ceremonies. It was also where the inhabitants of the city gathered for public activities. Elite residential complexes occupied the best land around the city centre, while commoners had their residences dispersed further away from the ceremonial centre. Residential units were built on top of stone platforms to raise them above the level of the rain season floodwaters.

=== Building materials and methods ===
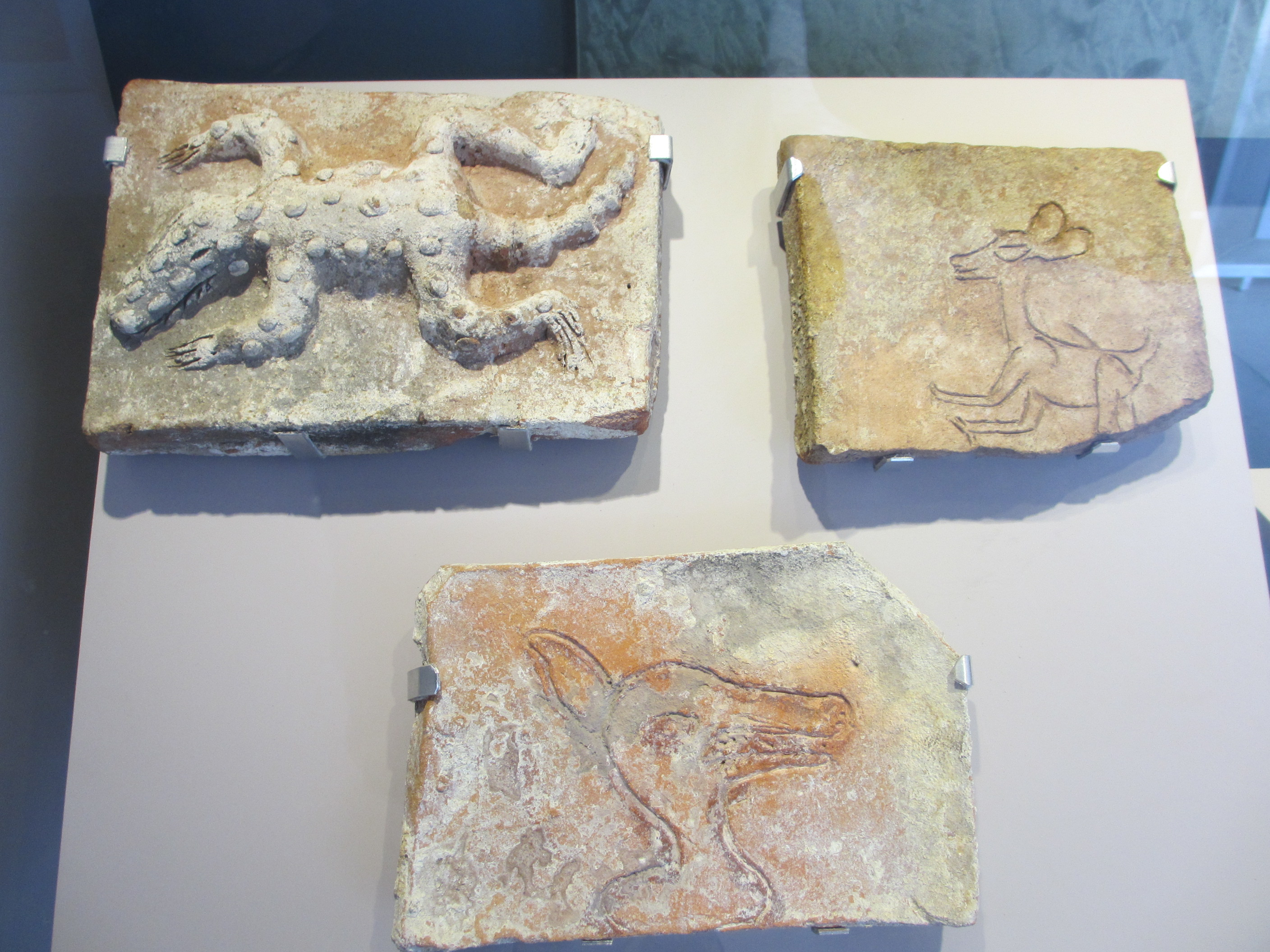
Fired bricks with animal designs from Comalcalco. Made from brick since there was a lack of readily available stone, it is unique among major Maya sites.

The Maya built their cities with Neolithic technology; they built their structures from both perishable materials and from stone. The exact type of stone used in masonry construction varied according to locally available resources, and this also affected the building style. Across a broad swathe of the Maya area, limestone was immediately available. The local limestone is relatively soft when freshly cut, but hardens with exposure. There was great variety in the quality of limestone, with good-quality stone available in the Usumacinta region; in the northern Yucatán, the limestone used in construction was of relatively poor quality. Volcanic tuff was used at Copán, and nearby Quiriguá employed sandstone. In Comalcalco, where suitable stone was not available locally, fired bricks were employed. Limestone was burned at high temperatures in order to manufacture cement, plaster, and stucco. Lime-based cement was used to seal stonework in place, and stone blocks were fashioned using rope-and-water abrasion, and with obsidian tools. The Maya did not employ a functional wheel, so all loads were transported on litters, barges, or rolled on logs. Heavy loads were lifted with rope, but probably without employing pulleys.

Wood was used for beams, and for lintels, even in masonry structures. Throughout Maya history, common huts and some temples continued to be built from wooden poles and thatch. Adobe was also applied; this consisted of mud strengthened with straw and was applied as a coating over the woven-stick walls of huts, even after the development of masonry structures. In the southern Maya area, adobe was employed in monumental architecture when no suitable stone was locally available.

=== Principal construction types ===
The great cities of the Maya civilization were composed of pyramid temples, palaces, ballcourts, sacbeob (causeways), patios and plazas. Some cities also possessed extensive hydraulic systems or defensive walls. The exteriors of most buildings were painted, either in one or multiple colours, or with imagery. Many buildings were adorned with sculpture or painted stucco reliefs.

==== Palaces and acropoleis ====
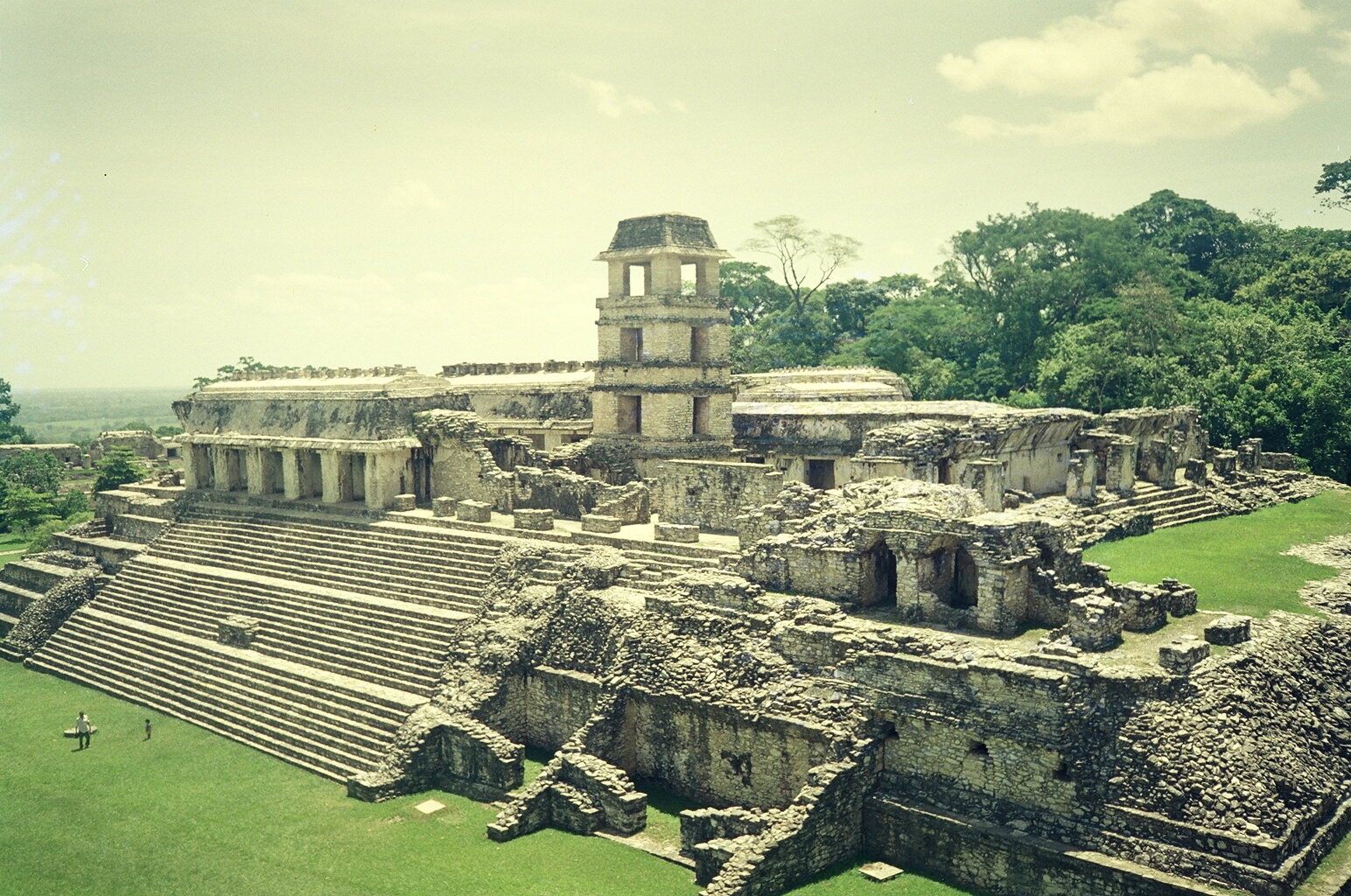
The Palace of Palenque, which features an observation tower and an aqueduct

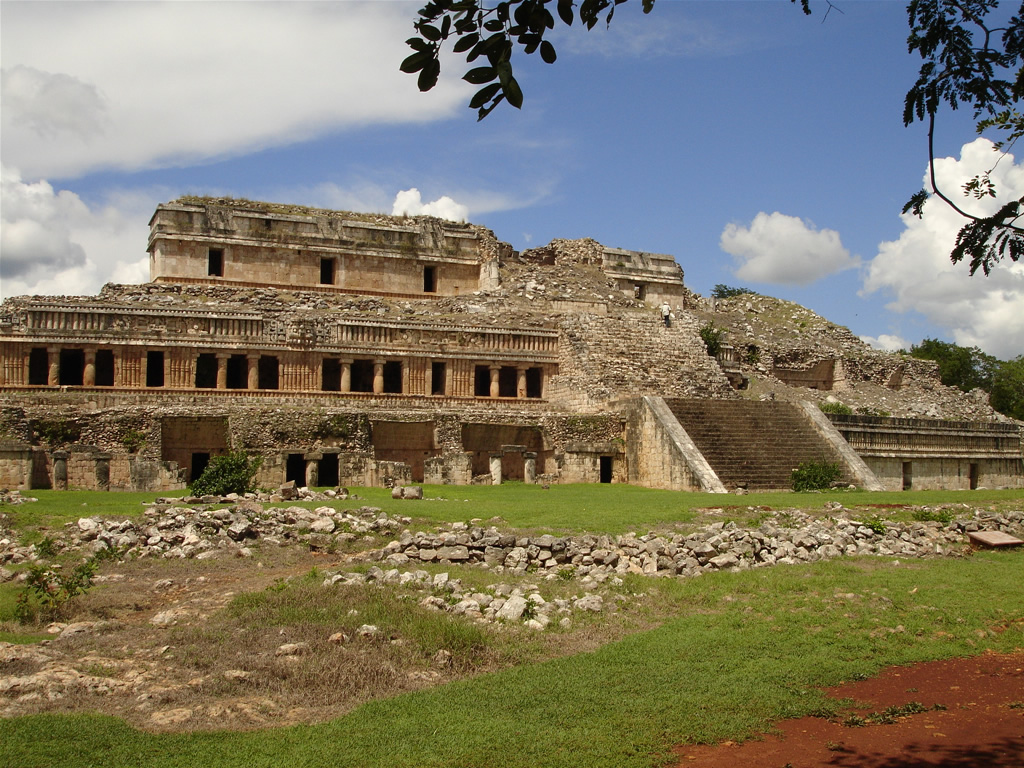
Terminal Classic multi-storied palace complex at Sayil, in the Northern Yucatan

These complexes were usually located in the site core, beside a principal plaza. Maya palaces consisted of a platform supporting a multiroom range structure. The term acropolis, in a Maya context, refers to a complex of structures built upon platforms of varying height. Palaces and acropoleis were essentially elite residential compounds. They generally extended horizontally as opposed to the towering Maya pyramids, and often had restricted access. Some structures in Maya acropoleis supported roof combs. Rooms often had stone benches for sleeping, and holes indicate where curtains once hung. Large palaces, such as at Palenque, could be fitted with a water supply, and sweat baths were often found within the complex, or nearby. During the Early Classic, rulers were sometimes buried underneath the acropolis complex. Some rooms in palaces were true throne rooms; in the royal palace of Palenque there were a number of throne rooms that were used for important events, including the inauguration of new kings.

Palaces are usually arranged around one or more courtyards, with their façades facing inwards; some examples are adorned with sculpture. Some palaces possess associated hieroglyphic descriptions that identify them as the royal residences of named rulers. There is abundant evidence that palaces were far more than simple elite residences, and that a range of courtly activities took place in them, including audiences, formal receptions, and important rituals.

==== Pyramids and temples ====
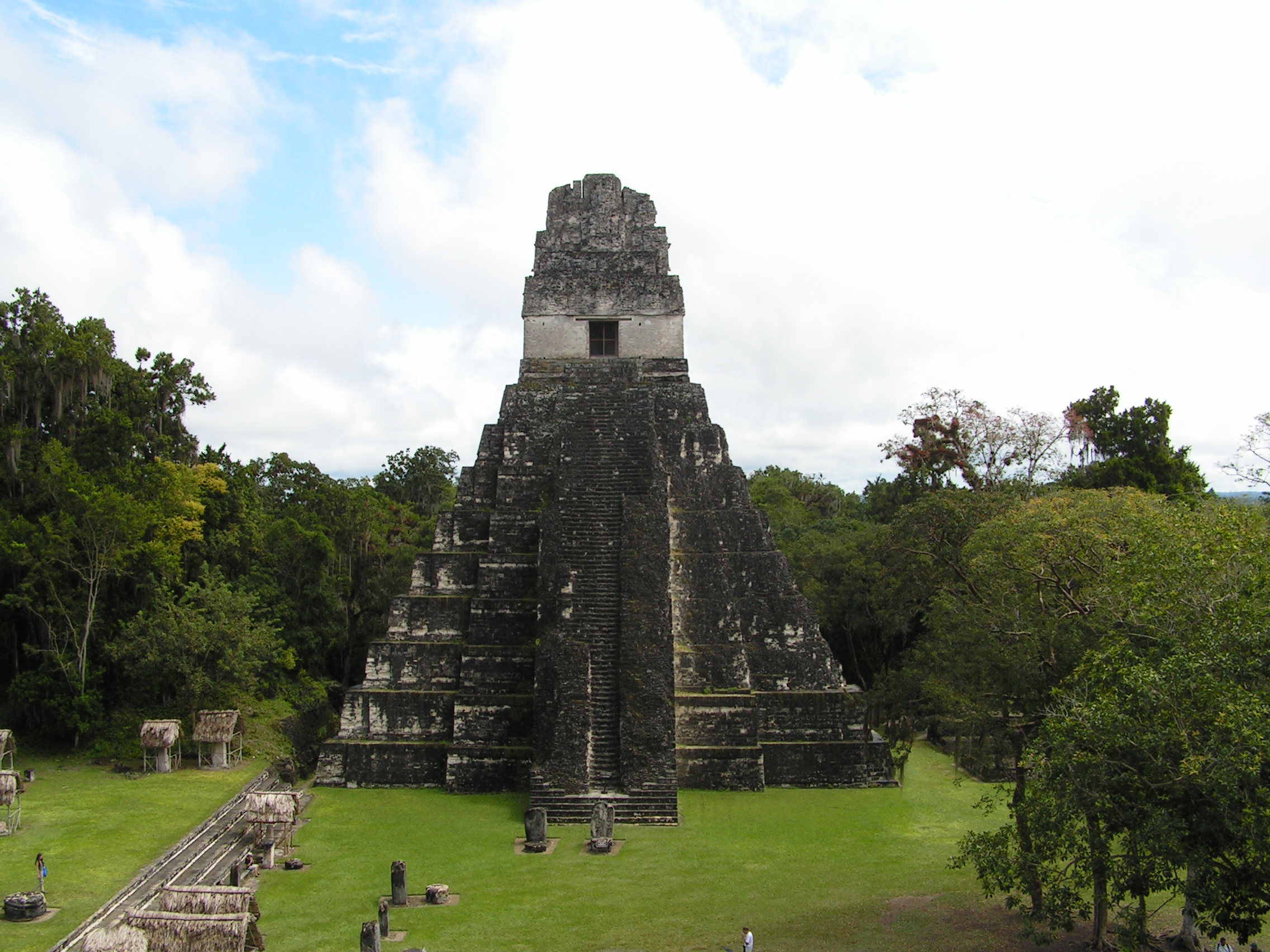
Temple I, at Tikal, was a funerary temple in honour of king Jasaw Chan Kʼawiil I.

Temples were sometimes referred to in hieroglyphic texts as kʼuh nah, meaning "god's house". Temples were raised on platforms, most often upon a pyramid. The earliest temples were probably thatched huts built upon low platforms. By the Late Preclassic period, their walls were of stone, and the development of the corbel arch allowed stone roofs to replace thatch. By the Classic period, temple roofs were being topped with roof combs that extended the height of the temple and served as a foundation for monumental art. Temple shrines contained one to three rooms, and were dedicated to important deities. Such a deity might be one of the patron gods of the city, or a deified ancestor. In general, freestanding pyramids were shrines honouring powerful ancestors.

==== E-Groups and observatories ====
The Maya were keen observers of the sun, stars, and planets. E-Groups were a particular arrangement of temples that were relatively common in the Maya region; they take their names from Group E at Uaxactun. They consisted of three small structures facing a fourth structure, and were used to mark the solstices and equinoxes. The earliest examples date to the Preclassic period. The Lost World complex at Tikal started out as an E-Group built towards the end of the Middle Preclassic. Due to its nature, the basic layout of an E-Group was constant. A structure was built on the west side of a plaza; it was usually a radial pyramid with stairways facing the cardinal directions. It faced east across the plaza to three small temples on the far side. From the west pyramid, the sun was seen to rise over these temples on the solstices and equinoxes. E-Groups were raised across the central and southern Maya area for over a millennium; not all were properly aligned as observatories, and their function may have been symbolic.

As well as E-Groups, the Maya built other structures dedicated to observing the movements of celestial bodies. Many Maya buildings were aligned with astronomical bodies, including the planet Venus, and various constellations. The Caracol structure at Chichen Itza was a circular multi-level edifice, with a conical superstructure. It has slit windows that marked the movements of Venus. At Copán, a pair of stelae were raised to mark the position of the setting sun at the equinoxes.

==== Triadic pyramids ====
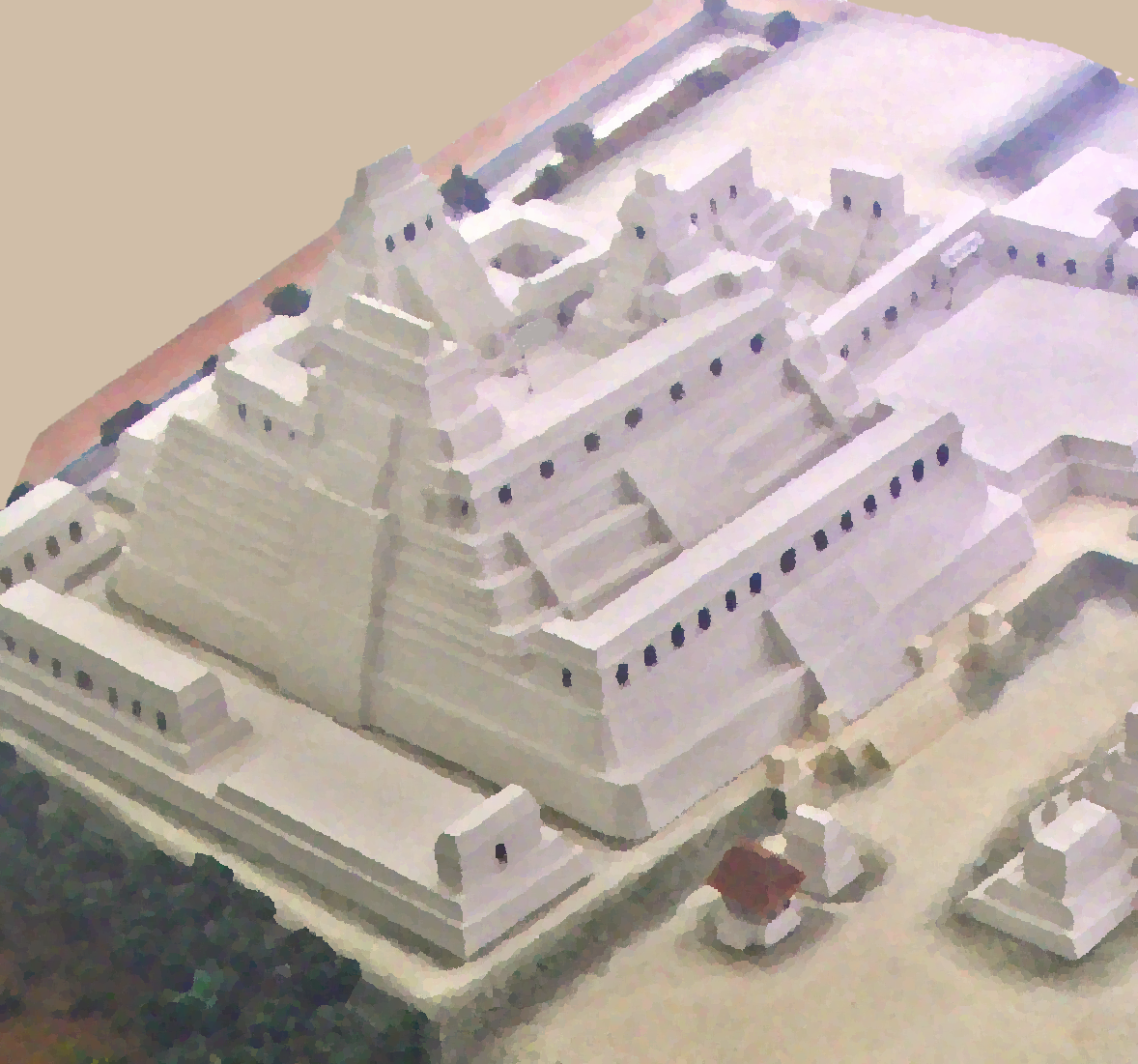
Model of a triadic pyramid at Caracol, Belize

Triadic pyramids first appeared in the Preclassic. They consisted of a dominant structure flanked by two smaller inward-facing buildings, all mounted upon a single basal platform. The largest known triadic pyramid was built at El Mirador in the Petén Basin; it covers an area six times as large as that covered by Temple IV, the largest pyramid at Tikal. The three superstructures all have stairways leading up from the central plaza on top of the basal platform. No securely established forerunners of Triadic Groups are known, but they may have developed from the eastern range building of E-Group complexes. The triadic form was the predominant architectural form in the Petén region during the Late Preclassic. Examples of triadic pyramids are known from as many as 88 archaeological sites. At Nakbe, there are at least a dozen examples of triadic complexes and the four largest structures in the city are triadic in nature. At El Mirador there are probably as many as 36 triadic structures. Examples of the triadic form are even known from Dzibilchaltun in the far north of the Yucatán Peninsula, and Qʼumarkaj in the Highlands of Guatemala. The triadic pyramid remained a popular architectural form for centuries after the first examples were built; it continued in use into the Classic Period, with later examples being found at Uaxactun, Caracol, Seibal, Nakum, Tikal and Palenque. The Qʼumarkaj example is the only one that has been dated to the Postclassic Period. The triple-temple form of the triadic pyramid appears to be related to Maya mythology.

==== Ballcourts ====
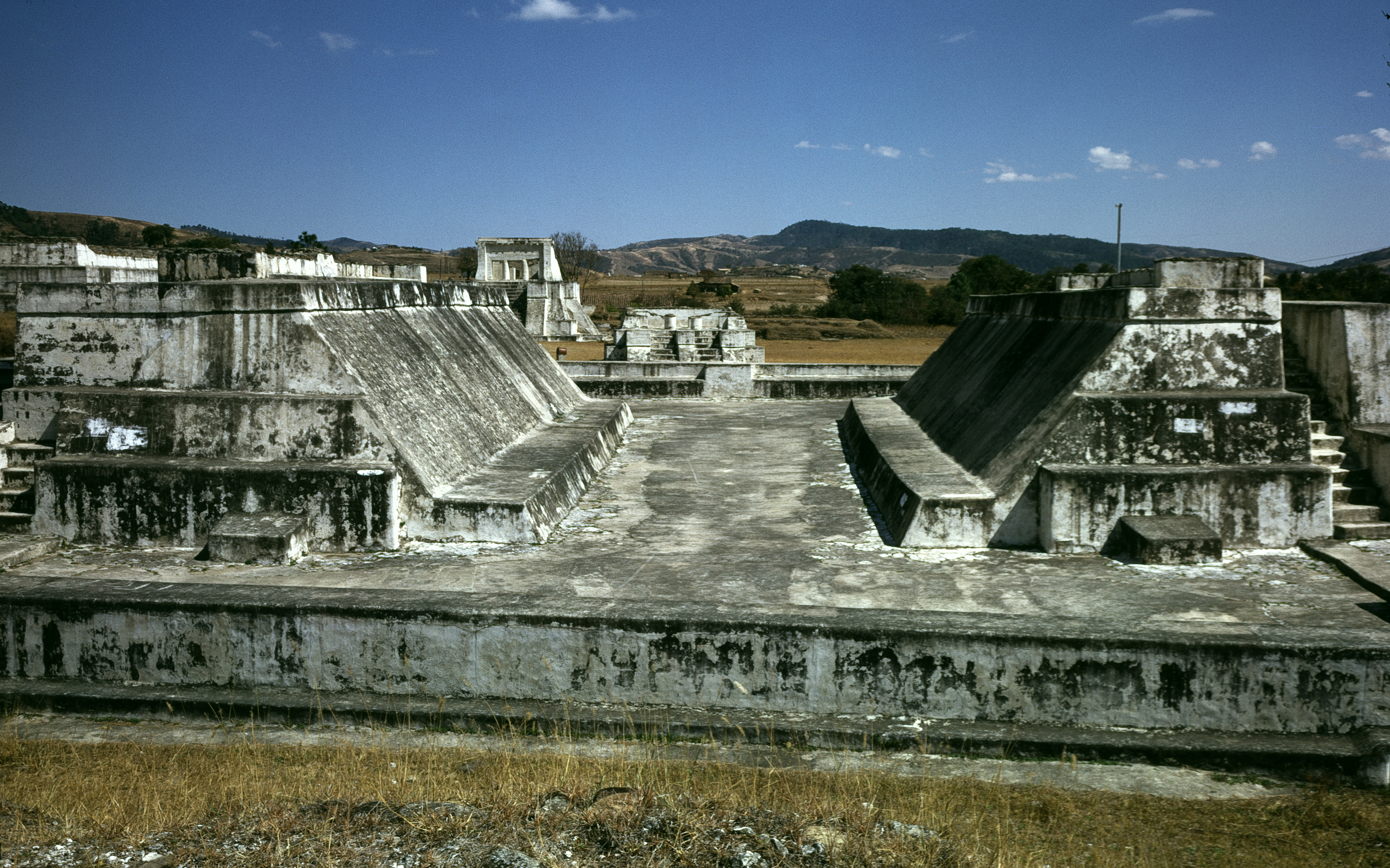
Postclassic ballcourt at Zaculeu, in the Guatemalan Highlands

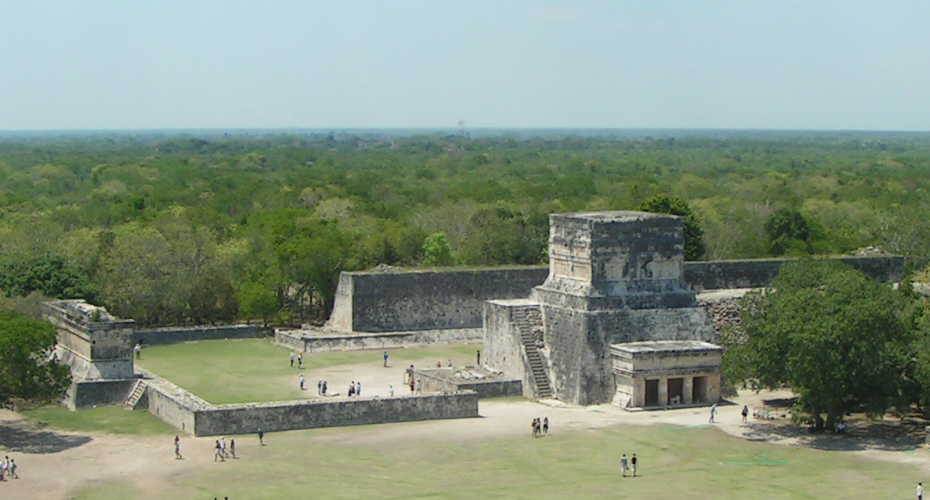
The Great Ballcourt of Chichen Itza

The ballcourt is a distinctive pan-Mesoamerican form of architecture. Although the majority of Maya ballcourts date to the Classic period, the earliest examples appeared around 1000 BC in northwestern Yucatán, during the Middle Preclassic. By the time of Spanish contact, ballcourts were only in use in the Guatemalan Highlands, at cities such as Qʼumarkaj and Iximche. Throughout Maya history, ballcourts maintained a characteristic form consisting of an ɪ shape, with a central playing area terminating in two transverse end zones. The central playing area usually measures between 20 and 30 metres (66 and 98 ft) long, and is flanked by two lateral structures that stood up to 3 or 4 metres (9.8 or 13.1 ft) high. The lateral platforms often supported structures that may have held privileged spectators. The Great Ballcourt at Chichen Itza is the largest in Mesoamerica, measuring 83 metres (272 ft) long by 30 metres (98 ft) wide, with walls standing 8.2 metres (27 ft) high.

=== Regional architectural styles ===
Although Maya cities shared many common features, there was considerable variation in architectural style. Such styles were influenced by locally available construction materials, climate, topography, and local preferences. In the Late Classic, these local differences developed into distinctive regional architectural styles.

==== Central Petén ====
The central Petén style of architecture is modelled after the great city of Tikal. The style is characterized by tall pyramids supporting a summit shrine adorned with a roof comb, and accessed by a single doorway. Additional features are the use of stela-altar pairings, and the decoration of architectural façades, lintels, and roof combs with relief sculptures of rulers and gods. One of the finest examples of Central Petén style architecture is Tikal Temple I. Examples of sites in the Central Petén style include Altun Ha, Calakmul, Holmul, Ixkun, Nakum, Naranjo, and Yaxhá.

==== Puuc ====
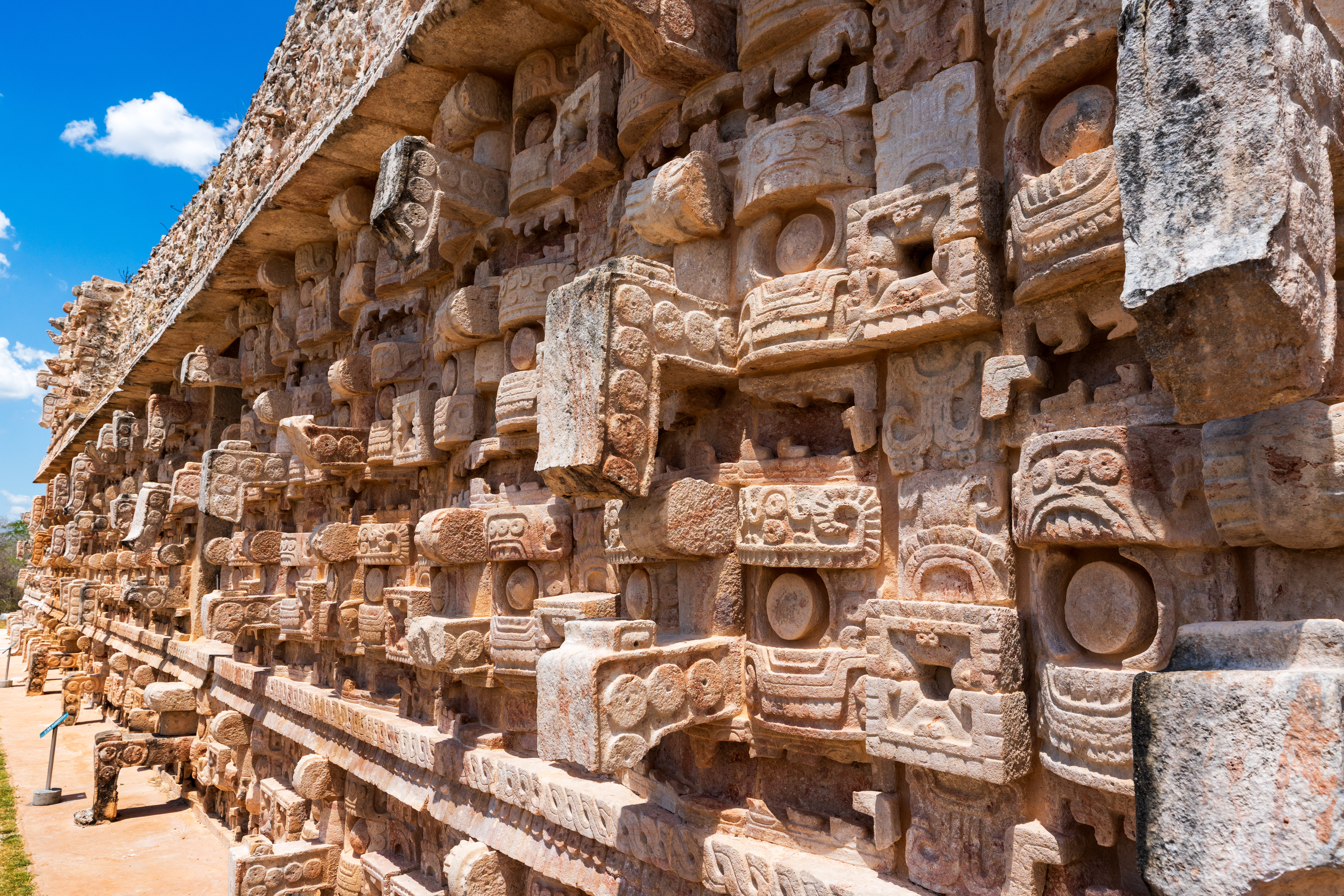
Elaborately carved stone masks depicting the rain god Chaac on the façade of the Palace of the Masks at Kabah

The exemplar of Puuc-style architecture is Uxmal. The style developed in the Puuc Hills of northwestern Yucatán; during the Terminal Classic it spread beyond this core region across the northern Yucatán Peninsula. Puuc sites replaced rubble cores with lime cement, resulting in stronger walls, and also strengthened their corbel arches; this allowed Puuc-style cities to build freestanding entrance archways. The upper façades of buildings were decorated with precut stones mosaic-fashion, erected as facing over the core, forming elaborate compositions of long-nosed deities such as the rain god Chaac and the Principal Bird Deity. The motifs also included geometric patterns, lattices and spools, possibly influenced by styles from highland Oaxaca, outside the Maya area. In contrast, the lower façades were left undecorated. Roof combs were relatively uncommon at Puuc sites.

==== Chenes ====
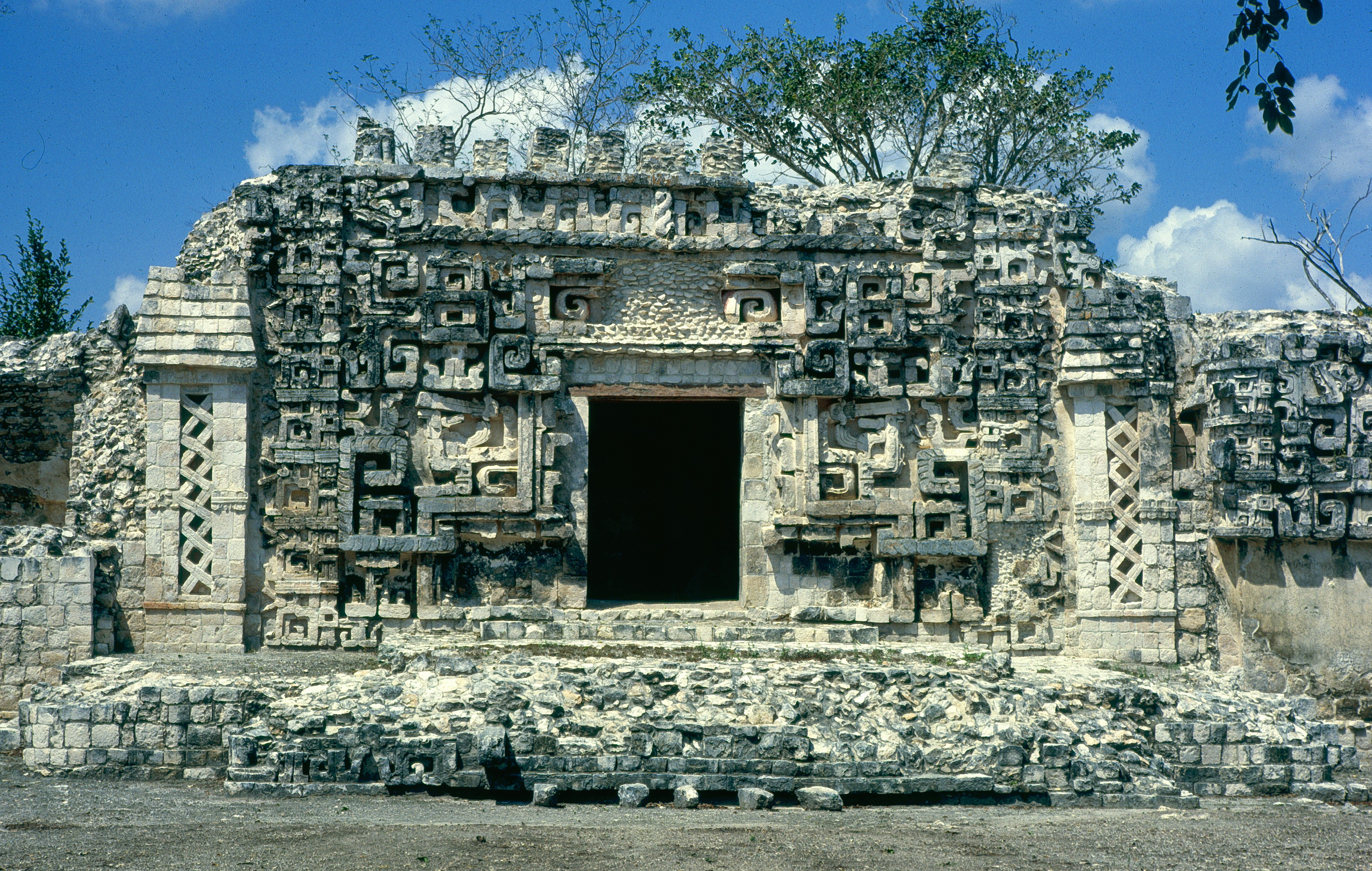
Elaborate Chenes-style façade at Hochob

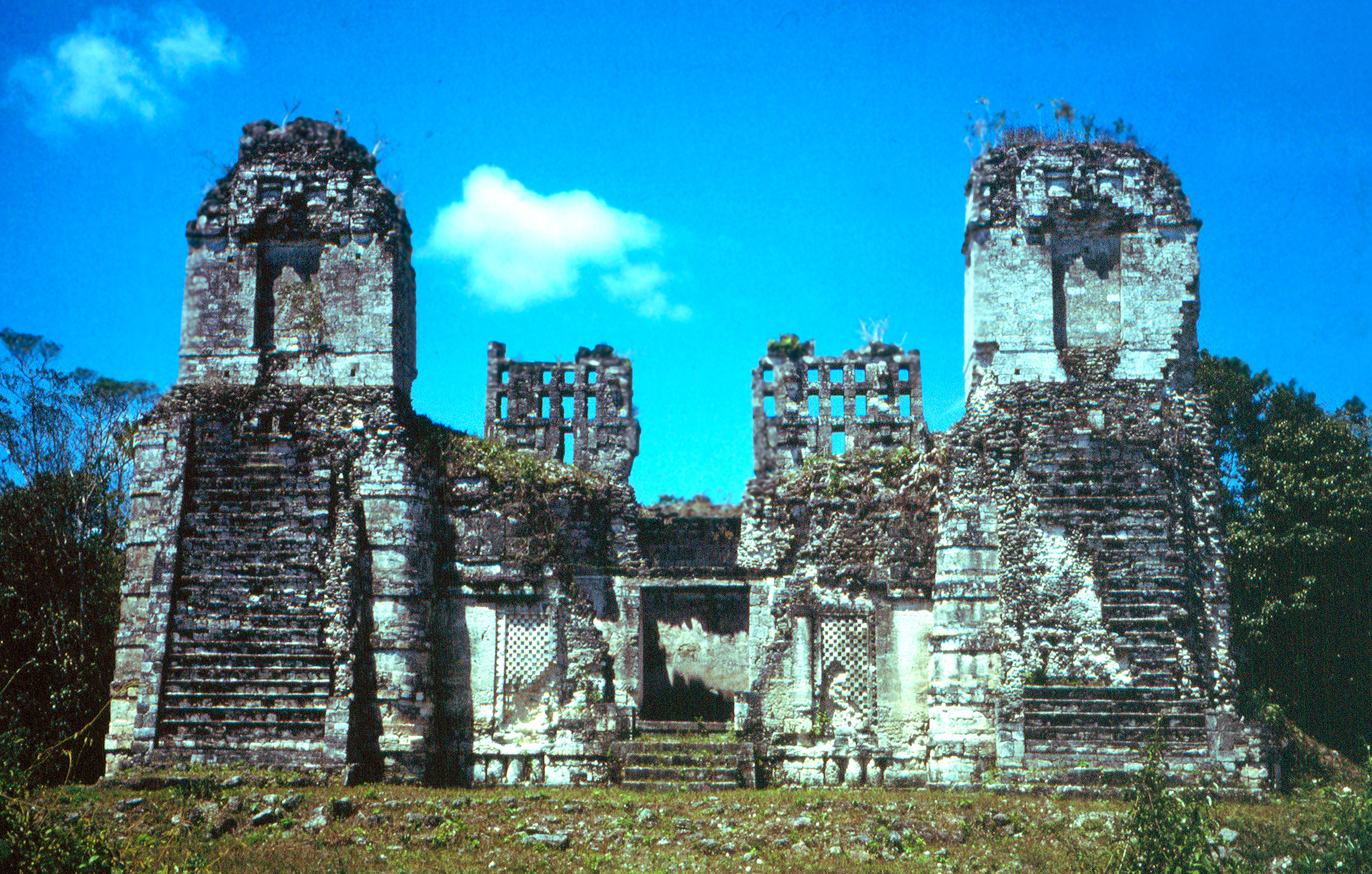
False pyramids adorn the façade of a Río Bec palace.

The Chenes style is very similar to the Puuc style, but predates the use of the mosaic façades of the Puuc region. It featured fully adorned façades on both the upper and lower sections of structures. Some doorways were surrounded by mosaic masks of monsters representing mountain or sky deities, identifying the doorways as entrances to the supernatural realm. Some buildings contained interior stairways that accessed different levels. The Chenes style is most commonly encountered in the southern portion of the Yucatán Peninsula, although individual buildings in the style can be found elsewhere in the peninsula. Examples of Chenes sites include Dzibilnocac, Hochob, Santa Rosa Xtampak, and Tabasqueño.

==== Río Bec ====
The Río Bec style forms a sub-region of the Chenes style, and also features elements of the Central Petén style, such as prominent roof combs. Its palaces are distinctive for their false-tower decorations, lacking interior rooms, with steep, almost vertical, stairways and false doors. These towers were adorned with deity masks, and were built to impress the viewer, rather than serve any practical function. Such false towers are only found in the Río Bec region. Río Bec sites include Chicanná, Hormiguero, and Xpuhil.

==== Usumacinta ====
The Usumacinta style developed in the hilly terrain of the Usumacinta drainage. Cities took advantage of the hillsides to support their major architecture, as at Palenque and Yaxchilan. Sites modified corbel vaulting to allow thinner walls and multiple access doors to temples. As in Petén, roof combs adorned principal structures. Palaces had multiple entrances that used post-and-lintel entrances rather than corbel vaulting. Many sites erected stelae, but Palenque instead developed finely sculpted panelling to decorate its buildings.

== Language ==
Map of Mayan language migration routes

Before 2000 BC, the Maya spoke a single language, dubbed proto-Mayan by linguists. Linguistic analysis of reconstructed Proto-Mayan vocabulary suggests that the original Proto-Mayan homeland was in the western or northern Guatemalan Highlands, although the evidence is not conclusive. Proto-Mayan diverged during the Preclassic period to form the major Mayan language groups that make up the family, including Huastecan, Greater Kʼicheʼan, Greater Qʼanjobalan, Mamean, Tzʼeltalan-Chʼolan, and Yucatecan. These groups diverged further during the pre-Columbian era to form over 30 languages that have survived into modern times. The language of almost all Classic Maya texts over the entire Maya area has been identified as Chʼolan; Late Preclassic text from Kaminaljuyu, in the highlands, also appears to be in, or related to, Chʼolan. The use of Chʼolan as the language of Maya text does not necessarily indicate that it was the language commonly used by the local populace – it may have been equivalent to Medieval Latin as a ritual or prestige language. Classic Chʼolan may have been the prestige language of the Classic Maya elite, used in inter-polity communication such as diplomacy and trade. By the Postclassic period, Yucatec was also being written in Maya codices alongside Chʼolan.

== Writing and literacy ==
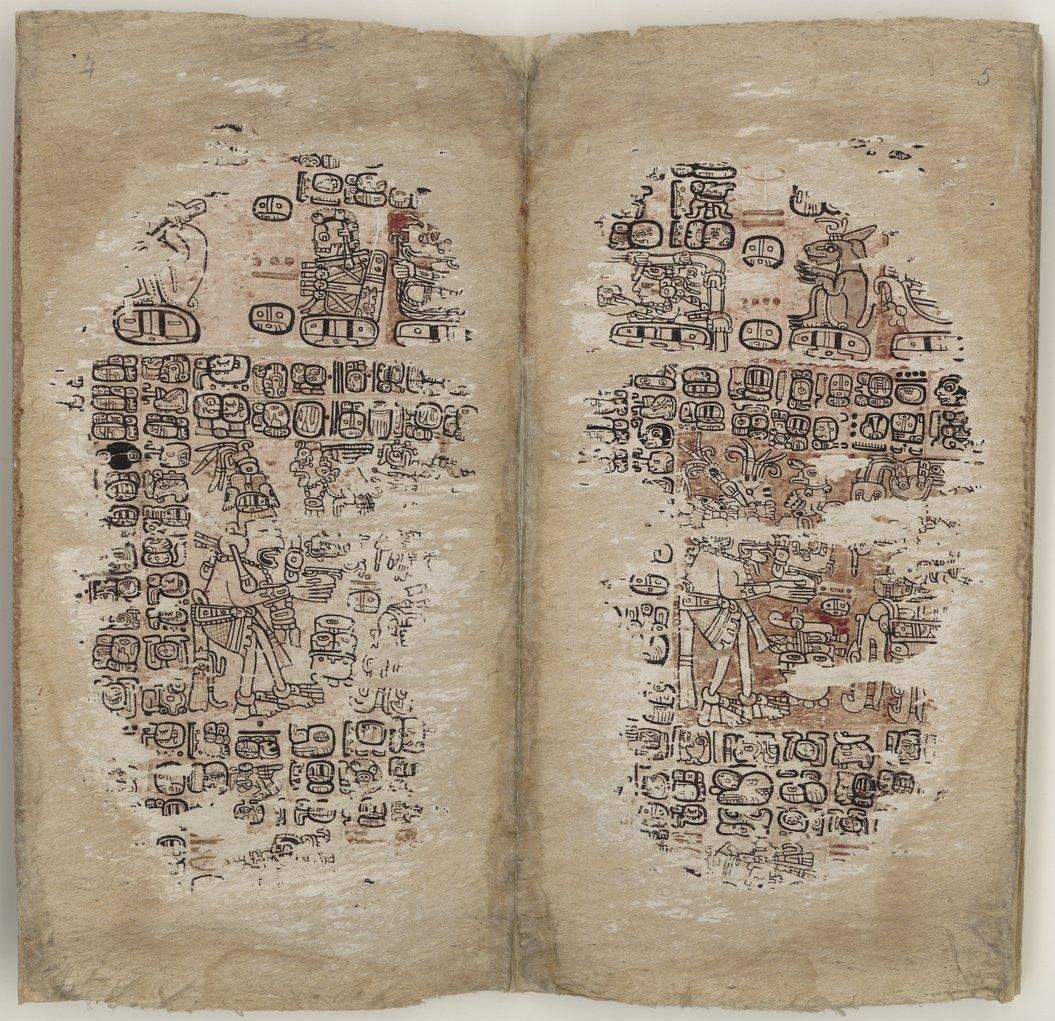
Pages from the Postclassic period Paris Codex, one of the few surviving Maya books in existence

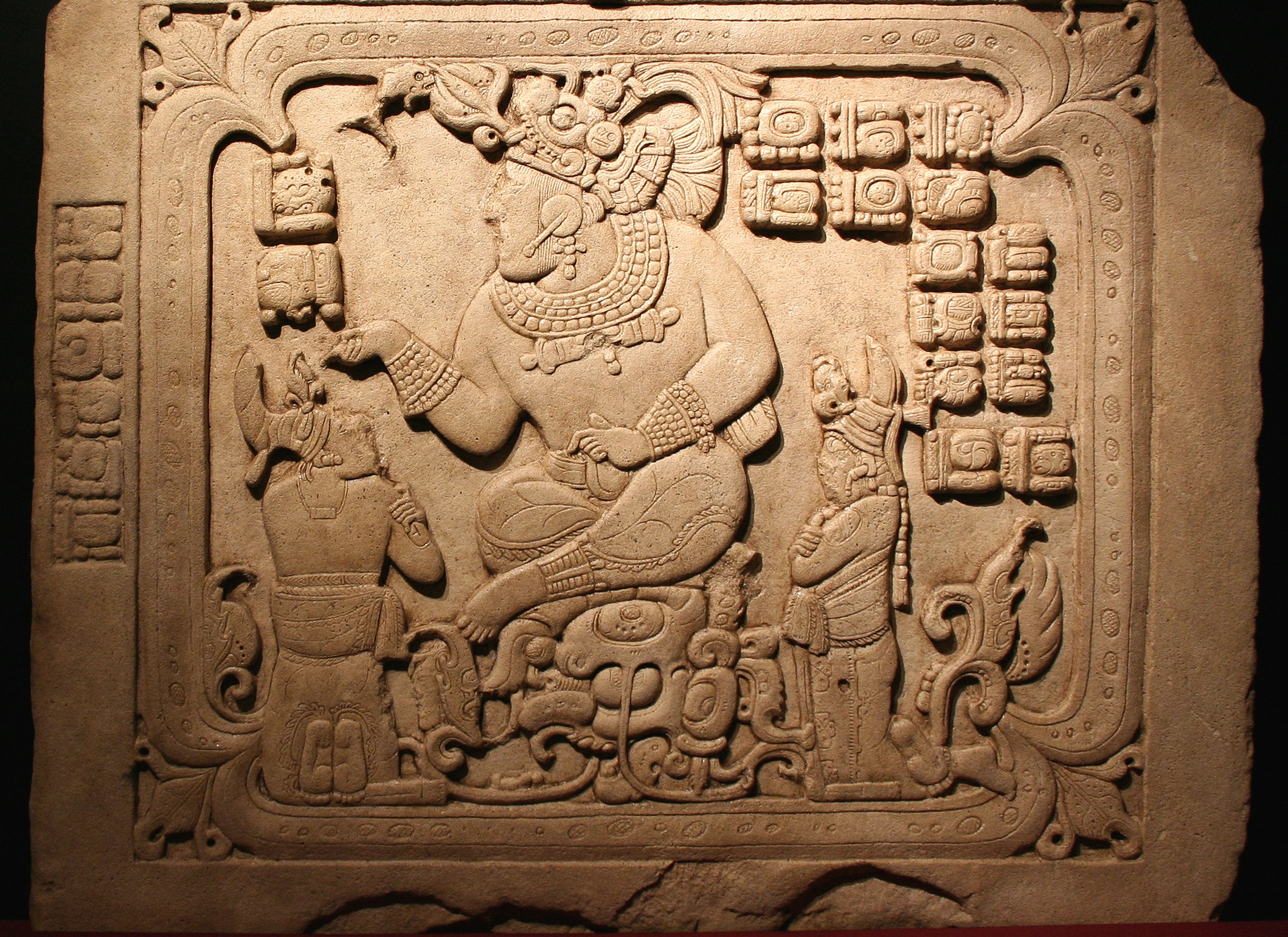
Maya script on Cancuén Panel 3 describes the installation of two vassals at Machaquilá by Cancuén king Taj Chan Ahk.

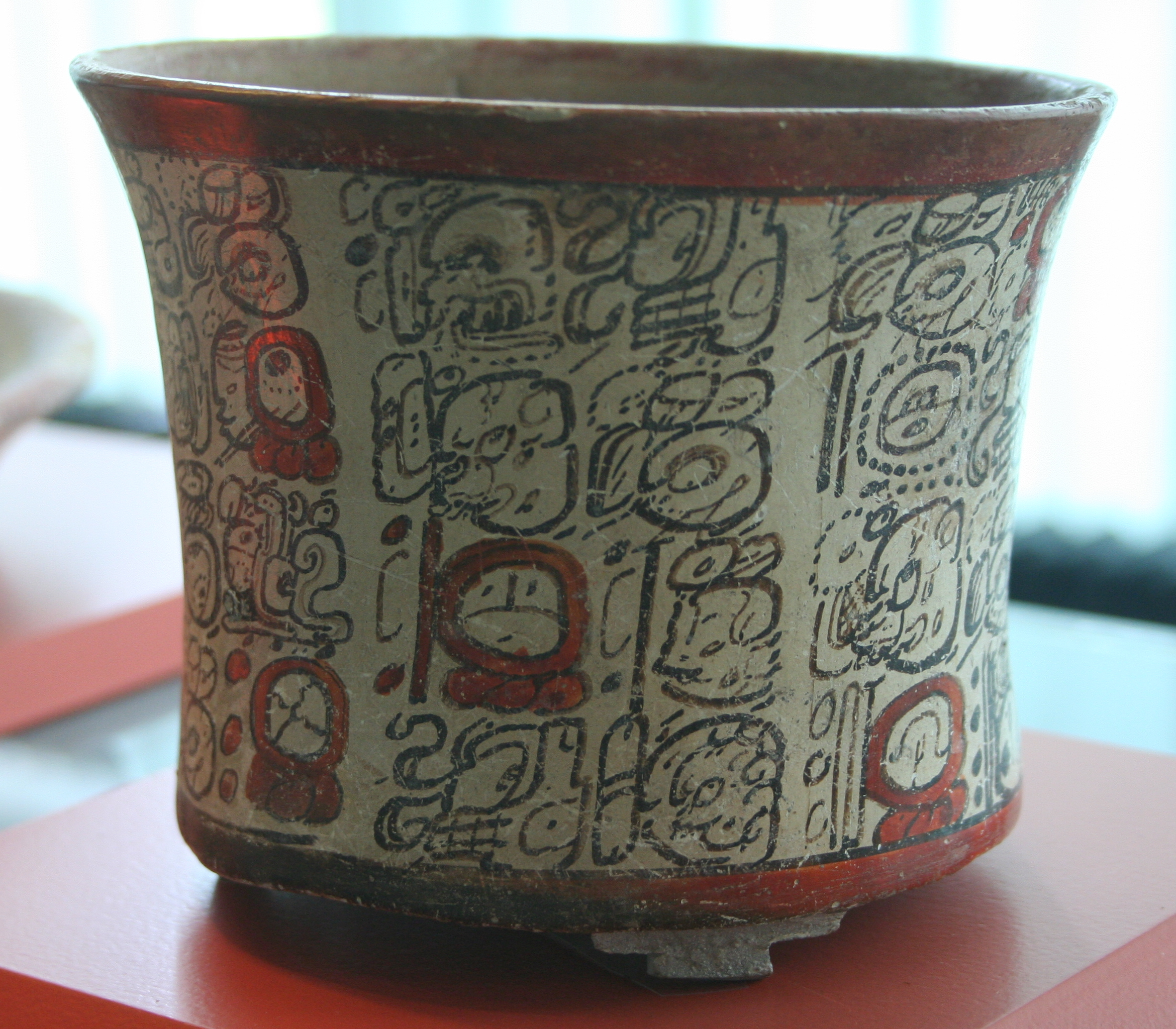
Ceramic vessel painted with Maya script in the Ethnologisches Museum, Berlin

The Maya writing system is one of the outstanding achievements of the pre-Columbian inhabitants of the Americas. It was the most sophisticated and highly developed writing system of more than a dozen systems that developed in Mesoamerica. The earliest inscriptions in an identifiably Maya script date back to 300–200 BC, in the Petén Basin. However, this is preceded by several other Mesoamerican writing systems, such as the Epi-Olmec and Zapotec scripts. Early Maya script had appeared on the Pacific coast of Guatemala by the late 1st century AD, or early 2nd century. Similarities between the Isthmian script and Early Maya script of the Pacific coast suggest that the two systems developed in tandem. By about AD 250, the Maya script had become a more formalized and consistent writing system.

The Catholic Church and colonial officials, notably Bishop Diego de Landa, destroyed Maya texts wherever they found them, and with them the knowledge of Maya writing, but by chance four uncontested pre-Columbian books dated to the Postclassic period have been preserved. These are known as the Madrid Codex, the Dresden Codex, the Paris Codex and the Maya Codex of Mexico (previously known as the Grolier Codex, which was of disputed authenticity until 2018). Archaeology conducted at Maya sites often reveals other fragments, rectangular lumps of plaster and paint chips which were codices; these tantalizing remains are, however, too severely damaged for any inscriptions to have survived, most of the organic material having decayed. In reference to the few extant Maya writings, Michael D. Coe stated:

[O]ur knowledge of ancient Maya thought must represent only a tiny fraction of the whole picture, for of the thousands of books in which the full extent of their learning and ritual was recorded, only four have survived to modern times (as though all that posterity knew of ourselves were to be based upon three prayer books and 'Pilgrim's Progress').

— Michael D. Coe, The Maya, London: Thames and Hudson, 6th ed., 1999, pp. 199–200.

Most surviving pre-Columbian Maya writing dates to the Classic period and is contained in stone inscriptions from Maya sites, such as stelae, or on ceramics vessels. Other media include the aforementioned codices, stucco façades, frescoes, wooden lintels, cave walls, and portable artefacts crafted from a variety of materials, including bone, shell, obsidian, and jade.

=== Writing system ===
The Maya word Bʼalam ("jaguar") written twice in the Maya script. The first glyph writes the word logographically with the jaguar head standing for the entire word. The second glyph block writes the word phonetically using the three syllable signs BA, LA and MA.

The Maya writing system (often called hieroglyphs from a superficial resemblance to Ancient Egyptian writing) is a logosyllabic writing system, combining a syllabary of phonetic signs representing syllables with logogram representing entire words. Among the writing systems of the Pre-Columbian New World, Maya script most closely represents the spoken language. At any one time, no more than around 500 glyphs were in use, some 200 of which (including variations) were phonetic.

The Maya script was in use up to the arrival of the Europeans, its use peaking during the Classic Period. In excess of 10,000 individual texts have been recovered, mostly inscribed on stone monuments, lintels, stelae and ceramics. The Maya also produced texts painted on a form of paper manufactured from processed tree-bark generally now known by its Nahuatl-language name amatl used to produce codices. The skill and knowledge of Maya writing persisted among segments of the population right up to the Spanish conquest. The knowledge was subsequently lost, as a result of the impact of the conquest on Maya society.

The decipherment and recovery of the knowledge of Maya writing has been a long and laborious process. Some elements were first deciphered in the late 19th and early 20th century, mostly the parts having to do with numbers, the Maya calendar, and astronomy. Major breakthroughs were made from the 1950s to 1970s, and accelerated rapidly thereafter. By the end of the 20th century, scholars were able to read the majority of Maya texts, and ongoing work continues to further illuminate the content.

=== Logosyllabic script ===
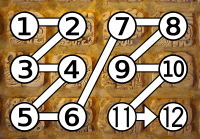
Reading order of Maya hieroglyphic text, consisting of twelve glyph blocks arranged in two double columns

The basic unit of Maya logosyllabic text is the glyph block, which transcribes a word or phrase. The block is composed of one or more individual glyphs attached to each other to form the glyph block, with individual glyph blocks generally being separated by a space. Glyph blocks are usually arranged in a grid pattern. For ease of reference, epigraphers refer to glyph blocks from left to right alphabetically, and top to bottom numerically. Thus, any glyph block in a piece of text can be identified. C4 would be third block counting from the left, and the fourth block counting downwards. If a monument or artefact has more than one inscription, column labels are not repeated, rather they continue in the alphabetic series; if there are more than 26 columns, the labelling continues as A', B', etc. Numeric row labels restart from 1 for each discrete unit of text.

Although Mayan text may be laid out in varying manners, generally it is arranged into double columns of glyph blocks. The reading order of text starts at the top left (block A1), continues to the second block in the double-column (B1), then drops down a row and starts again from the left half of the double column (A2), and thus continues in zig-zag fashion. Once the bottom is reached, the inscription continues from the top left of the next double column (C1). Where an inscription ends in a single (unpaired) column, this final column is usually read straight downwards.

Individual glyph blocks may be composed of a number of elements. These consist of the main sign, and any affixes. Main signs represent the major element of the block, and may be a noun, verb, adverb, adjective, or phonetic sign. Some main signs are abstract, some are pictures of the object they represent, and others are "head variants", personifications of the word they represent. Affixes are smaller rectangular elements, usually attached to a main sign, although a block may be composed entirely of affixes. Affixes may represent a wide variety of speech elements, including nouns, verbs, verbal suffixes, prepositions, and pronouns. Small sections of a main sign could be used to represent the whole main sign. Maya scribes were highly inventive in their usage and adaptation of glyph elements.

=== Writing tools ===
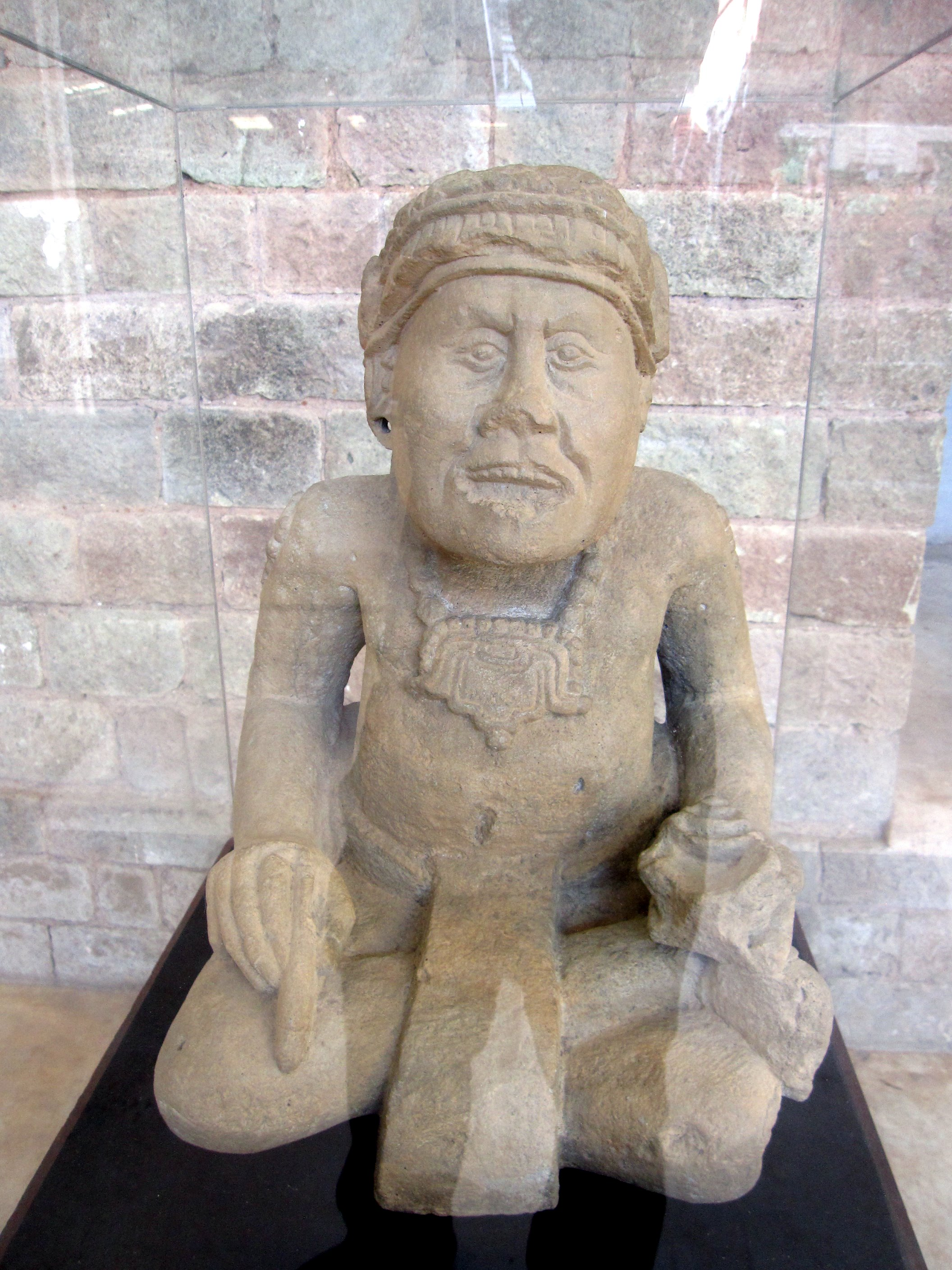
Sculpture of a scribe from Copán, Honduras

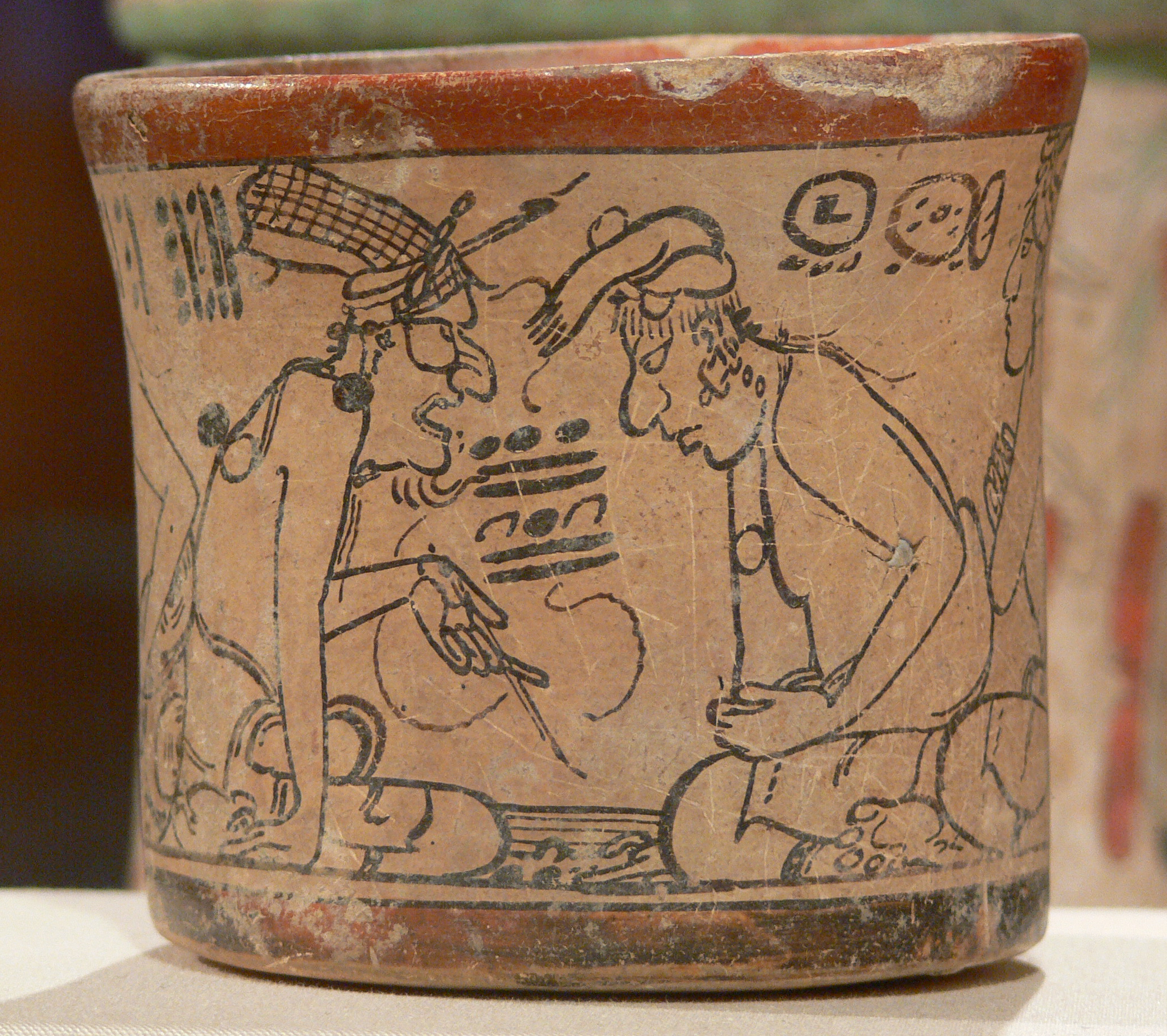
Illustration of a Maya scribe on a Classic period vessel. Kimbell Art Museum, Fort Worth.

Although the archaeological record does not provide examples of brushes or pens, analysis of ink strokes on the Postclassic codices suggests that it was applied with a brush with a tip fashioned from pliable hair. A Classic period sculpture from Copán, Honduras, depicts a scribe with an inkpot fashioned from a conch shell. Excavations at Aguateca uncovered a number of scribal artefacts from the residences of elite status scribes, including palettes and mortars and pestles.

=== Scribes and literacy ===
Commoners were illiterate; scribes were drawn from the elite. It is not known if all members of the aristocracy could read and write, although at least some women could, since there are representations of female scribes in Maya art. Maya scribes were called aj tzʼib, meaning "one who writes or paints". There were probably scribal schools where members of the aristocracy were taught to write. Scribal activity is identifiable in the archaeological record; Jasaw Chan Kʼawiil I, king of Tikal, was interred with his paint pot. Some junior members of the Copán royal dynasty have also been found buried with their writing implements. A palace at Copán has been identified as that of a noble lineage of scribes; it is decorated with sculpture that includes figures holding ink pots.

Although not much is known about Maya scribes, some did sign their work, both on ceramics and on stone sculpture. Usually, only a single scribe signed a ceramic vessel, but multiple sculptors are known to have recorded their names on stone sculpture; eight sculptors signed one stela at Piedras Negras. However, most works remained unsigned by their artists.

== Mathematics ==
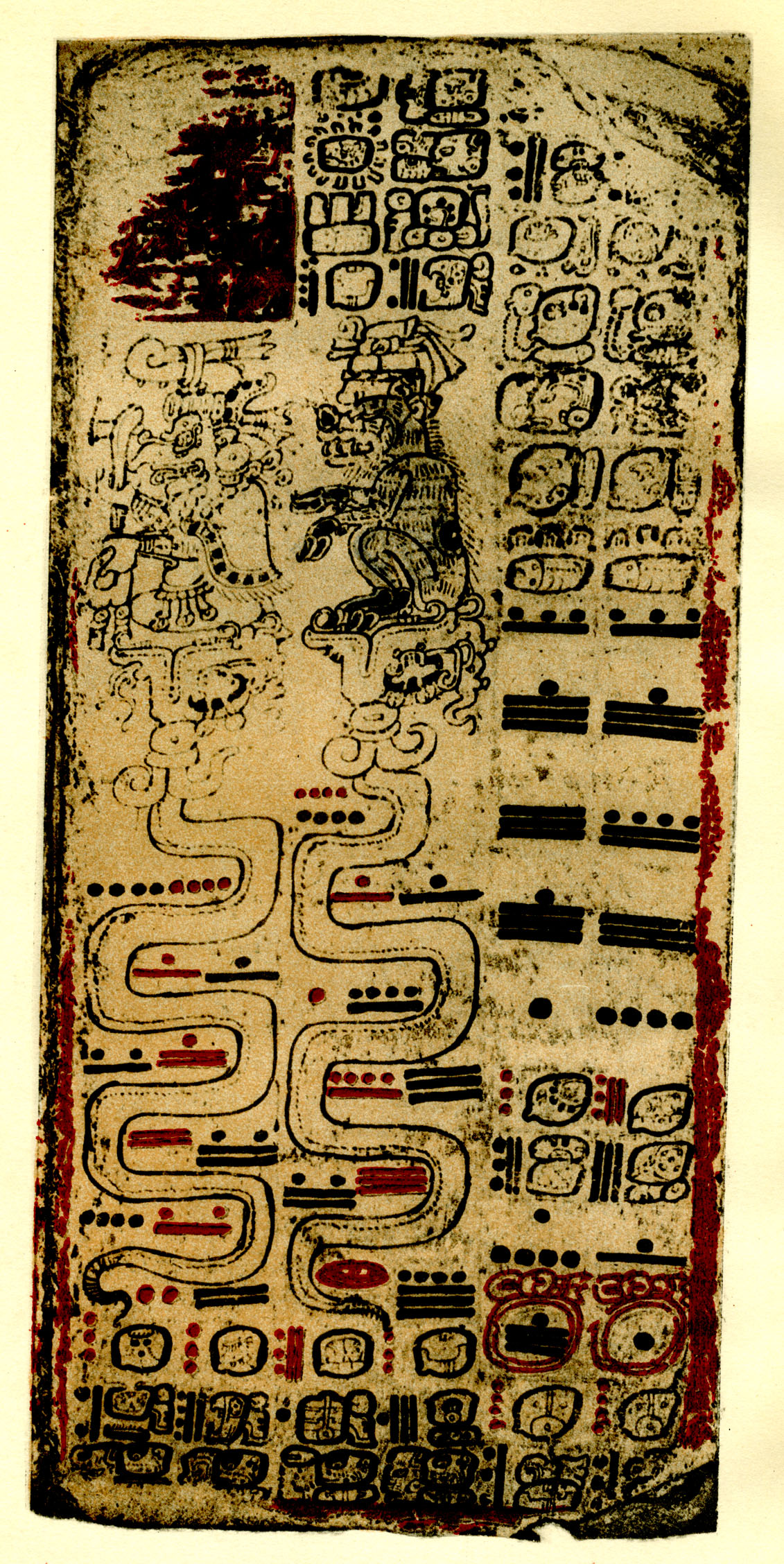
Maya numerals on a page of the Postclassic Dresden Codex

Maya numerals

In common with the other Mesoamerican civilizations, the Maya used a base 20 (vigesimal) system. The bar-and-dot counting system that is the base of Maya numerals was in use in Mesoamerica by 1000 BC; the Maya adopted it by the Late Preclassic, and added the symbol for zero. This may have been the earliest known occurrence of the idea of an explicit zero worldwide, although it may have been later than the Babylonian system. The earliest explicit use of zero occurred on monuments dated to 357 AD. In its earliest uses, the zero served as a place holder, indicating an absence of a particular calendrical count. This later developed into a numeral that was used to perform calculation, and was used in hieroglyphic texts for more than a thousand years, until the writing system was extinguished by the Spanish.

The basic number system consists of a dot to represent one, and a bar to represent five. By the Postclassic period a shell symbol represented zero; during the Classic period other glyphs were used. The Maya numerals from 0 to 19 used repetitions of these symbols. The value of a numeral was determined by its position; as a numeral shifted upwards, its basic value multiplied by twenty. In this way, the lowest symbol would represent units, the next symbol up would represent multiples of twenty, and the symbol above that would represent multiples of 400, and so on. For example, the number 884 would be written with four dots on the lowest level, four dots on the next level up, and two dots on the next level after that, to give 4×1 + 4×20 + 2×400 = 884. Using this system, the Maya were able to record huge numbers. Simple addition could be performed by summing the dots and bars in two columns to give the result in a third column.

== Calendar ==
The Maya calendrical system, in common with other Mesoamerican calendars, had its origins in the Preclassic period. However, it was the Maya that developed the calendar to its maximum sophistication, recording lunar and solar cycles, eclipses and movements of planets with great accuracy. In some cases, the Maya calculations were more accurate than equivalent calculations in the Old World; for example, the Maya solar year was calculated to greater accuracy than the Julian year. The Maya calendar was intrinsically tied to Maya ritual, and it was central to Maya religious practices. The calendar combined a non-repeating Long Count with three interlocking cycles, each measuring a progressively larger period. These were the 260-day tzolkʼin, the 365-day haabʼ, and the 52-year Calendar Round, resulting from the combination of the tzolkʼin with the haab'. There were also additional calendric cycles, such as an 819-day cycle associated with the four quadrants of Maya cosmology, governed by four different aspects of the god Kʼawiil.

The basic unit in the Maya calendar was one day, or kʼin, and 20 kʼin grouped to form a winal. The next unit, instead of being multiplied by 20, as called for by the vigesimal system, was multiplied by 18 in order to provide a rough approximation of the solar year (hence producing 360 days). This 360-day year was called a tun. Each succeeding level of multiplication followed the vigesimal system.

Long Count periods
Period	Calculation	Span	Years (approx.)
kʼin	1 day	1 day	
winal	1 x 20	20 days	
tun	20 x 18	360 days	1 year
kʼatun	20 x 18 x 20	7,200 days	20 years
bakʼtun	20 x 18 x 20 x 20	144,000 days	394 years
piktun	20 x 18 x 20 x 20 x 20	2,880,000 days	7,885 years
kalabtun	20 x 18 x 20 x 20 x 20 x 20	57,600,000 days	157,700 years
kinchiltun	20 x 18 x 20 x 20 x 20 x 20 x 20	1,152,000,000 days	3,154,004 years
alawtun	20 x 18 x 20 x 20 x 20 x 20 x 20 x 20	23,040,000,000 days	63,080,082 years

The 260-day tzolkʼin provided the basic cycle of Maya ceremony, and the foundations of Maya prophecy. No astronomical basis for this count has been proved, and it may be that the 260-day count is based on the human gestation period. This is reinforced by the use of the tzolkʼin to record dates of birth, and provide corresponding prophecy. The 260-day cycle repeated a series of 20-day-names, with a number from 1 to 13 prefixed to indicated where in the cycle a particular day occurred.

The 365-day haab was produced by a cycle of eighteen named 20-day winals, completed by the addition of a 5-day period called the wayeb. The wayeb was considered to be a dangerous time, when the barriers between the mortal and supernatural realms were broken, allowing malignant deities to cross over and interfere in human concerns. In a similar way to the tzʼolkin, the named winal would be prefixed by a number (from 0 to 19), in the case of the shorter wayeb period, the prefix numbers ran 0 to 4. Since each day in the tzʼolkin had a name and number (e.g. 8 Ajaw), this would interlock with the haab, producing an additional number and name, to give any day a more complete designation, for example 8 Ajaw 13 Keh. Such a day name could only recur once every 52 years, and this period is referred to by Mayanists as the Calendar Round. In most Mesoamerican cultures, the Calendar Round was the largest unit for measuring time.

As with any non-repeating calendar, the Maya measured time from a fixed start point. The Maya set the beginning of their calendar as the end of a previous cycle of bakʼtuns, equivalent to a day in 3114 BC. This was believed by the Maya to be the day of the creation of the world in its current form. The Maya used the Long Count Calendar to fix any given day of the Calendar Round within their current great Piktun cycle consisting of either 20 bakʼtuns. There was some variation in the calendar, specifically texts in Palenque demonstrate that the piktun cycle that ended in 3114 BC had only 13 bakʼtuns, but others used a cycle of 13 + 20 bakʼtun in the current piktun. Additionally, there may have been some regional variation in how these exceptional cycles were managed.

A full long count date consisted of an introductory glyph followed by five glyphs counting off the number of bakʼtuns, katʼuns, tuns, winals, and kʼins since the start of the current creation. This would be followed by the tzʼolkin portion of the Calendar Round date, and after a number of intervening glyphs, the Long Count date would end with the Haab portion of the Calendar Round date.

=== Correlation of the Long Count calendar ===
Although the Calendar Round is still in use today, the Maya started using an abbreviated Short Count during the Late Classic period. The Short Count is a count of 13 kʼatuns. The Book of Chilam Balam of Chumayel contains the only colonial reference to classic long-count dates. The most generally accepted correlation is the Goodman-Martínez-Thompson, or GMT, correlation. This equates the Long Count date 11.16.0.0.0 13 Ajaw 8 Xul with the Gregorian date of 12 November 1539. Epigraphers Simon Martin and Nikolai Grube argue for a two-day shift from the standard GMT correlation. The Spinden Correlation would shift the Long Count dates back by 260 years; it also accords with the documentary evidence, and is better suited to the archaeology of the Yucatán Peninsula, but presents problems with the rest of the Maya region. The George Vaillant Correlation would shift all Maya dates 260 years later, and would greatly shorten the Postclassic period. Radiocarbon dating of dated wooden lintels at Tikal supports the GMT correlation.

== Astronomy ==
The famous astrologer John Dee used an Aztec obsidian mirror to see into the future. We may look down our noses at his ideas, but one may be sure that in outlook he was far closer to a Maya priest astronomer than is an astronomer of our century.

— J. Eric S. Thompson, Maya Astronomy: Philosophical Transactions of the Royal Society, 1974

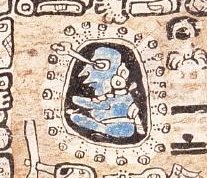
Representation of an astronomer from the Madrid Codex

The Maya made meticulous observations of celestial bodies. This information was used for divination, so Maya astronomy was essentially for astrological purposes. Although Maya astronomy was mainly used by the priesthood to comprehend past cycles of time, and project them into the future to produce prophecy, it also had some practical applications, such as providing aid in crop planting and harvesting. The priesthood refined observations and recorded eclipses of the sun and moon, and movements of Venus and the stars; these were measured against dated events in the past, on the assumption that similar events would occur in the future when the same astronomical conditions prevailed. Illustrations in the codices show that priests made astronomical observations using the naked eye, assisted by crossed sticks as a sighting device. Analysis of the few remaining Postclassic codices has revealed that, at the time of European contact, the Maya had recorded eclipse tables, calendars, and astronomical knowledge that was more accurate at that time than comparable knowledge in Europe.

The Maya measured the 584-day Venus cycle with an error of just two hours. Five cycles of Venus equated to eight 365-day haab calendrical cycles, and this period was recorded in the codices. The Maya also followed the movements of Jupiter, Mars and Mercury. When Venus rose as the Morning Star, this was associated with the rebirth of the Maya Hero Twins. For the Maya, the heliacal rising of Venus was associated with destruction and upheaval. Venus was closely associated with warfare, and the hieroglyph meaning "war" incorporated the glyph-element symbolizing the planet. Sight-lines through the windows of the Caracol building at Chichen Itza align with the northernmost and southernmost extremes of Venus' path. Maya rulers launched military campaigns to coincide with the heliacal or cosmical rising of Venus, and would also sacrifice important captives to coincide with such conjunctions.

Solar and lunar eclipses were considered to be especially dangerous events that could bring catastrophe upon the world. In the Dresden Codex, a solar eclipse is represented by a serpent devouring the kʼin ("day") hieroglyph. Eclipses were interpreted as the sun or moon being bitten, and lunar tables were recorded in order that the Maya might be able to predict them, and perform the appropriate ceremonies to ward off disaster.

== Religion and mythology ==
In common with the rest of Mesoamerica, the Maya believed in a supernatural realm inhabited by an array of powerful deities who needed to be placated with ceremonial offerings and ritual practices. At the core of Maya religious practice was the worship of deceased ancestors, who would intercede for their living descendants in dealings with the supernatural realm. The earliest intermediaries between humans and the supernatural were shamans. Maya ritual included the use of hallucinogens for chilan, oracular priests. Visions for the chilan were likely facilitated by consumption of water lilies, which are hallucinogenic in high doses. As the Maya civilization developed, the ruling elite codified the Maya world view into religious cults that justified their right to rule. In the Late Preclassic, this process culminated in the institution of the divine king, the kʼuhul ajaw, endowed with ultimate political and religious power.

The Maya viewed the cosmos as highly structured. There were thirteen levels in the heavens and nine in the underworld, with the mortal world in between. Each level had four cardinal directions associated with a different colour; north was white, east was red, south was yellow, and west was black. Major deities had aspects associated with these directions and colours.

Maya households interred their dead underneath the floors, with offerings appropriate to the social status of the family. There the dead could act as protective ancestors. Maya lineages were patrilineal, so the worship of a prominent male ancestor would be emphasised, often with a household shrine. As Maya society developed, and the elite became more powerful, Maya royalty developed their household shrines into the great pyramids that held the tombs of their ancestors.

Belief in supernatural forces pervaded Maya life, from the simplest day-to-day activities such as cooking, to trade, politics, and elite activities. Maya deities governed all aspects of the world, both visible and invisible. The Maya priesthood was a closed group, drawing its members from the established elite; by the Early Classic they were recording increasingly complex ritual information in their hieroglyphic books, including astronomical observations, calendrical cycles, history and mythology. The priests performed public ceremonies that incorporated feasting, bloodletting, incense burning, music, ritual dance, and, on certain occasions, human sacrifice. During the Classic period, the Maya ruler was the high priest, and the direct conduit between mortals and the gods. It is highly likely that, among commoners, shamanism continued in parallel to state religion. By the Postclassic, religious emphasis had changed; there was an increase in worship of the images of deities, and more frequent recourse to human sacrifice.

Archaeologists painstakingly reconstruct these ritual practices and beliefs using several techniques. One important, though incomplete, resource is physical evidence, such as dedicatory caches and other ritual deposits, shrines, and burials with their associated funerary offerings. Maya art, architecture, and writing are another resource, and these can be combined with ethnographic sources, including records of Maya religious practices made by the Spanish during the conquest.

=== Human sacrifice ===
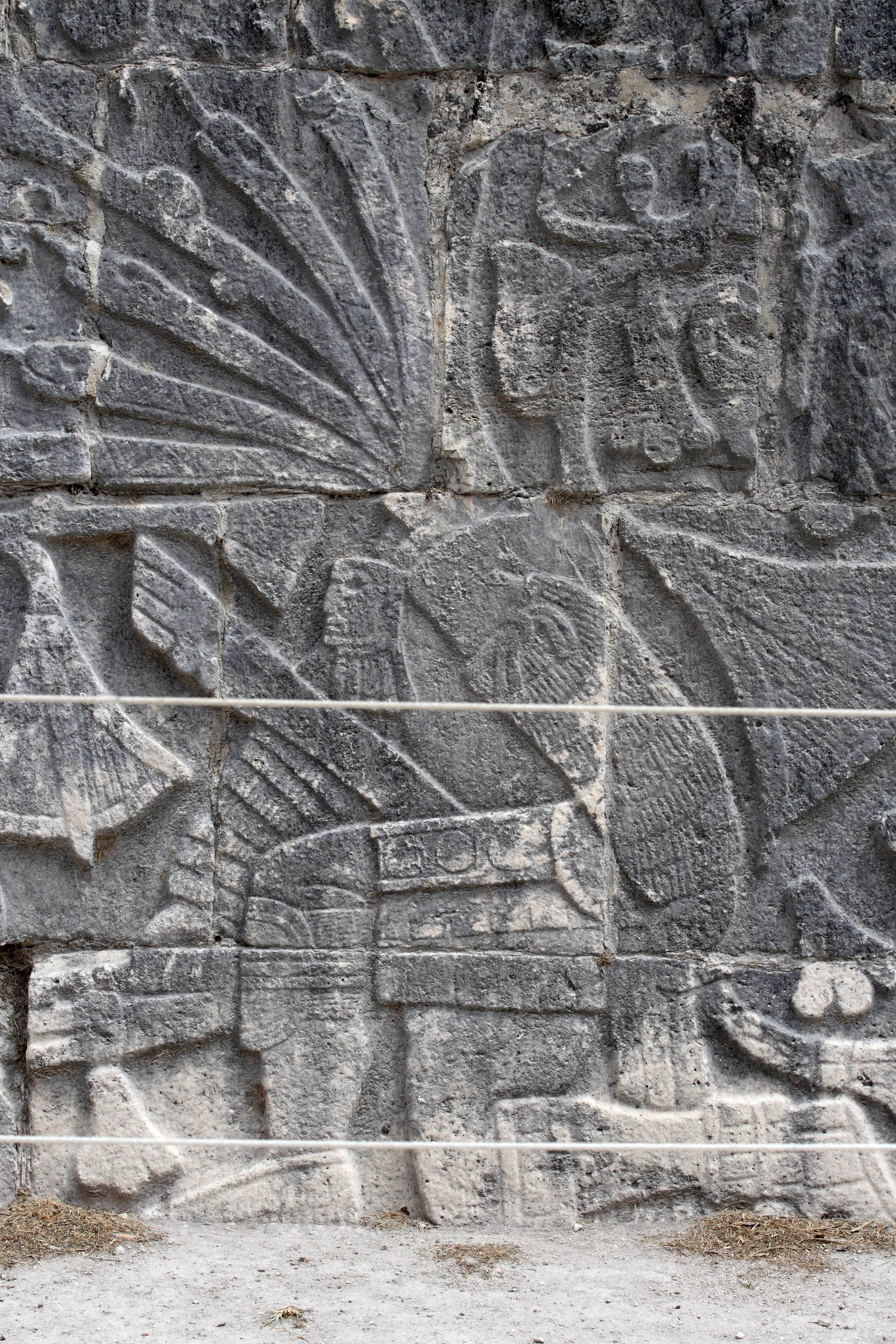
Relief sculpture of a decapitated ballplayer, adorning the Great Ballcourt at Chichen Itza

Blood was viewed as a potent source of nourishment for the Maya deities, and the sacrifice of a living creature was a powerful blood offering. By extension, the sacrifice of a human life was the ultimate offering of blood to the gods, and the most important Maya rituals culminated in human sacrifice. Generally only high status prisoners of war were sacrificed, with lower status captives being used for labour. These prisoners were viewed as trophies for Maya warriors, and their sacrifice brought honour and status to them and their families.

Important rituals such as the dedication of major building projects or the enthronement of a new ruler required a human offering. The sacrifice of an enemy king was the most prized, and such a sacrifice involved decapitation of the captive ruler, perhaps in a ritual reenactment of the decapitation of the Maya maize god by the death gods. In AD 738, the vassal king Kʼakʼ Tiliw Chan Yopaat of Quiriguá captured his overlord, Uaxaclajuun Ubʼaah Kʼawiil of Copán and a few days later ritually decapitated him. Sacrifice by decapitation is depicted in Classic period Maya art, and sometimes took place after the victim was tortured, being variously beaten, scalped, burnt or disembowelled. Another myth associated with decapitation was that of the Hero Twins recounted in the Popol Vuh: playing a ballgame against the gods of the underworld, the heroes achieved victory, but one of each pair of twins was decapitated by their opponents.

During the Postclassic period, the most common form of human sacrifice was heart extraction, influenced by the rites of the Aztecs in the Valley of Mexico; this usually took place in the courtyard of a temple, or upon the summit of the pyramid. In one ritual, the corpse would be skinned by assistant priests, except for the hands and feet, and the officiating priest would then dress himself in the skin of the sacrificial victim and perform a ritual dance symbolizing the rebirth of life. Archaeological investigations indicate that heart sacrifice was practised as early as the Classic period.

=== Deities ===
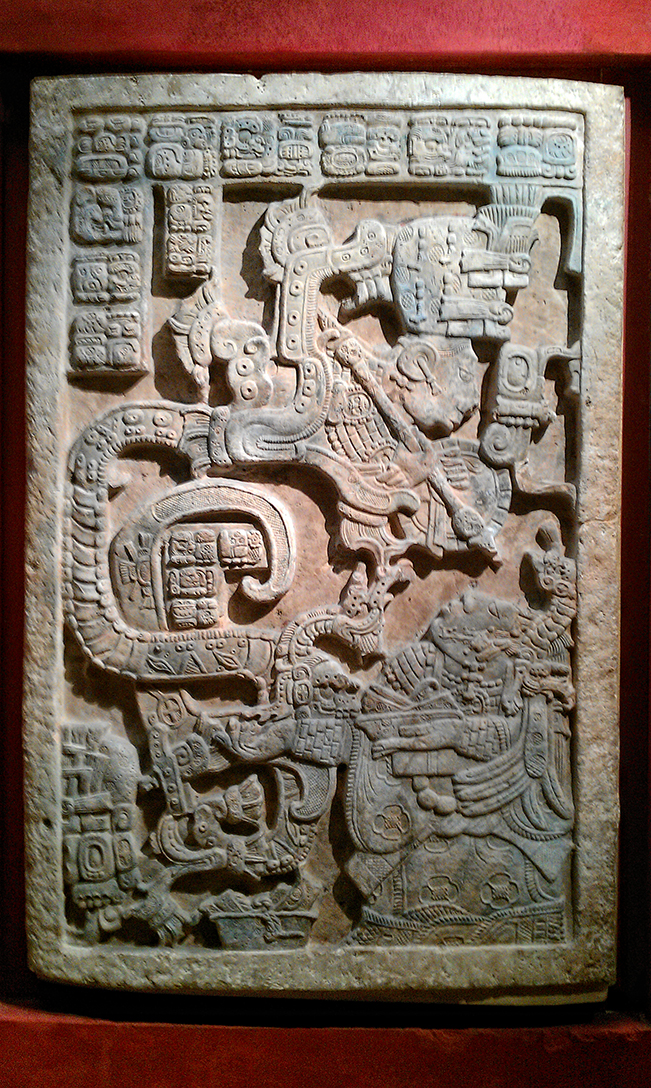
Classic period Lintel 25 from Yaxchilan, depicting the Vision Serpent

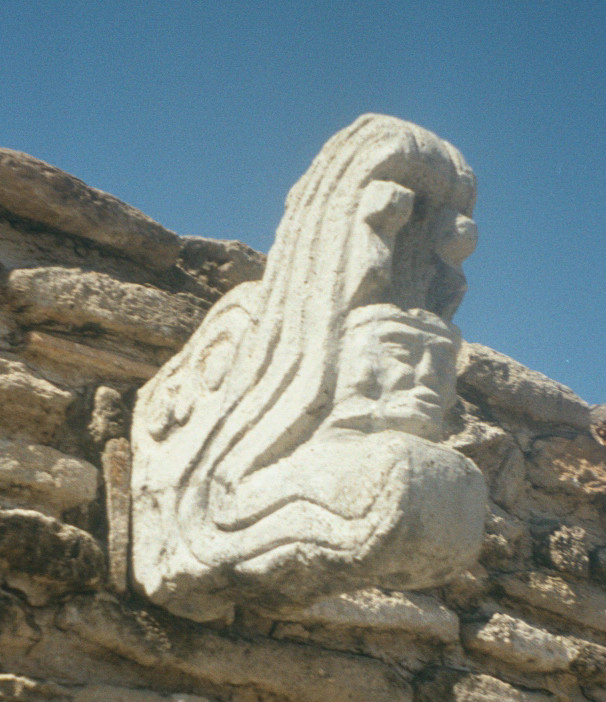
Postclassic ballcourt marker at Mixco Viejo, depicting Qʼuqʼumatz carrying Tohil across the sky in his jaws

The Maya world was populated by a great variety of deities, supernatural entities and sacred forces. The Maya had such a broad interpretation of the sacred that identifying distinct deities with specific functions is inaccurate. The Maya interpretation of deities was closely tied to the calendar, astronomy, and their cosmology. The importance of a deity, its characteristics, and its associations varied according to the movement of celestial bodies. The priestly interpretation of astronomical records and books was therefore crucial, since the priest would understand which deity required ritual propitiation, when the correct ceremonies should be performed, and what would be an appropriate offering. Each deity had four manifestations, associated with the cardinal directions, each identified with a different colour. They also had a dual day-night/life-death aspect.

Itzamna was the creator god, but he also embodied the cosmos, and was simultaneously a sun god; Kʼinich Ahau, the day sun, was one of his aspects. Maya kings frequently identified themselves with Kʼinich Ahau. Itzamna also had a night sun aspect, the Night Jaguar, representing the sun in its journey through the underworld. The four Pawatuns supported the corners of the mortal realm; in the heavens, the Bacabs performed the same function. As well as their four main aspects, the Bakabs had dozens of other aspects that are not well understood. The four Chaacs were storm gods, controlling thunder, lightning, and the rains. The nine lords of the night each governed one of the underworld realms. Other important deities included the moon goddess, the maize god, and the Hero Twins.

The Popol Vuh was written in the Latin script in early colonial times, and was probably transcribed from a hieroglyphic book by an unknown Kʼicheʼ Maya nobleman. It is one of the most outstanding works of indigenous literature in the Americas. The Popul Vuh recounts the mythical creation of the world, the legend of the Hero Twins, and the history of the Postclassic Kʼicheʼ kingdom. Deities recorded in the Popul Vuh include Hun Hunahpu, believed by some to be the Kʼicheʼ maize god, and a triad of deities led by the Kʼicheʼ patron Tohil, and also including the moon goddess Awilix, and the mountain god Jacawitz.

In common with other Mesoamerican cultures, the Maya worshipped feathered serpent deities. Such worship was rare during the Classic period, but by the Postclassic the feathered serpent had spread to both the Yucatán Peninsula and the Guatemalan Highlands. In Yucatán, the feathered serpent deity was Kukulkan, among the Kʼicheʼ it was Qʼuqʼumatz. Kukulkan had his origins in the Classic period War Serpent, Waxaklahun Ubah Kan, and has also been identified as the Postclassic version of the Vision Serpent of Classic Maya art. Although the cult of Kukulkan had its origins in these earlier Maya traditions, the worship of Kukulkan was heavily influenced by the Quetzalcoatl cult of central Mexico. Likewise, Qʼuqʼumatz had a composite origin, combining the attributes of Mexican Quetzalcoatl with aspects of the Classic period Itzamna.

== Agriculture ==
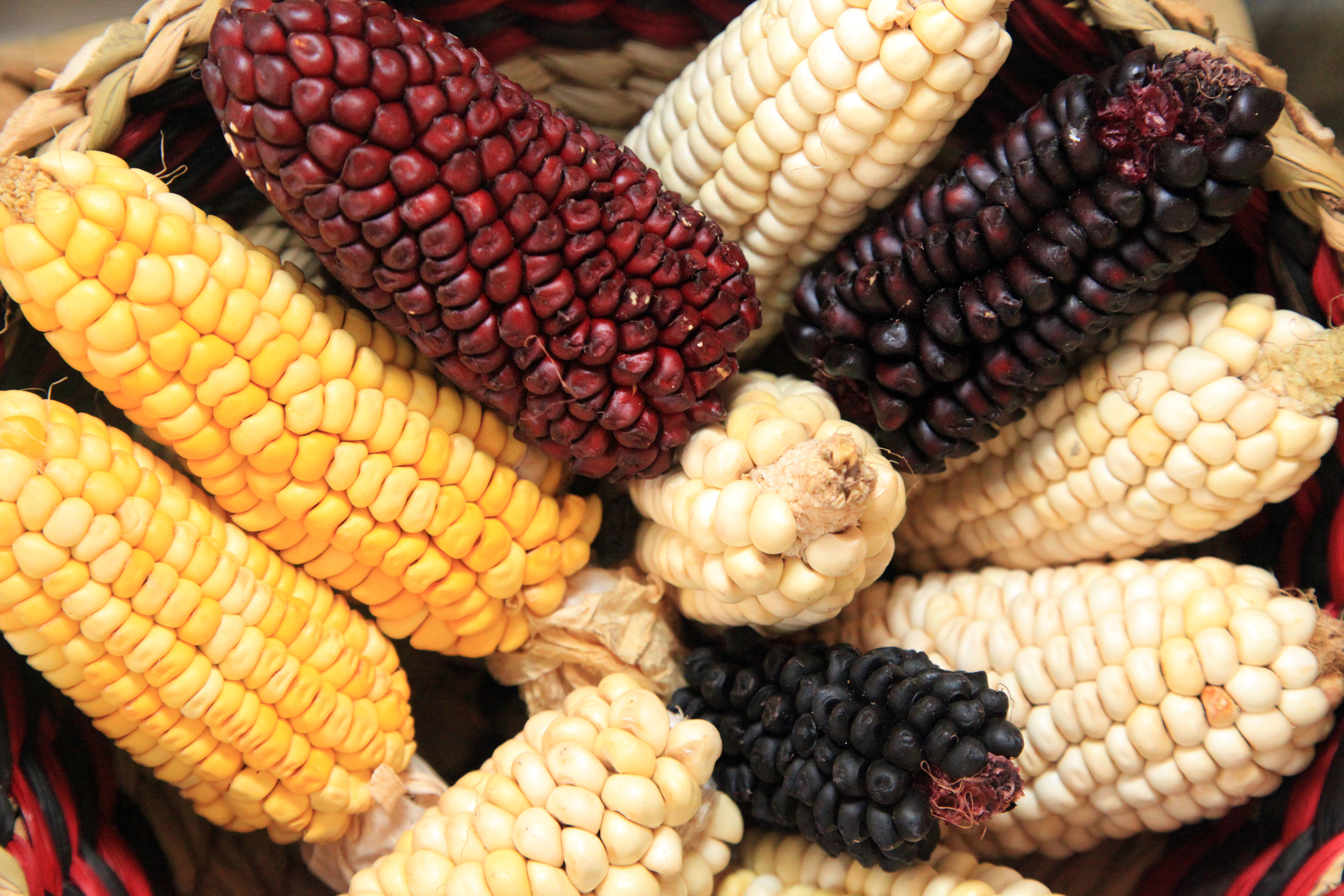
Maize was a staple of the Maya diet.

The ancient Maya had diverse and sophisticated methods of food production. It was believed that shifting cultivation (swidden) agriculture provided most of their food, but it is now thought that permanent raised fields, terracing, intensive gardening, forest gardens, and managed fallows were also crucial to supporting the large populations of the Classic period in some areas. Indeed, evidence of these different agricultural systems persist today: raised fields connected by canals can be seen on aerial photographs. Contemporary rainforest species composition has significantly higher abundance of species of economic value to ancient Maya in areas that were densely populated in pre-Columbian times, and pollen records in lake sediments suggest that maize, manioc, sunflower seeds, cotton, and other crops have been cultivated in association with deforestation in Mesoamerica since at least 2500 BC.

The basic staples of the Maya diet were maize, beans, and squashes. These were supplemented with a wide variety of other plants either cultivated in gardens or gathered in the forest. At Joya de Cerén, a volcanic eruption preserved a record of foodstuffs stored in Maya homes, among them were chilies and tomatoes. Cotton seeds were in the process of being ground, perhaps to produce cooking oil. In addition to basic foodstuffs, the Maya also cultivated prestige crops such as cotton, cacao and vanilla. Cacao was especially prized by the elite, who consumed chocolate beverages. Cotton was spun, dyed, and woven into valuable textiles in order to be traded.

The Maya had few domestic animals; dogs were domesticated by 3000 BC, and the Muscovy duck by the Late Postclassic. Ocellated turkeys were unsuitable for domestication, but were rounded up in the wild and penned for fattening. All of these were used as food animals; dogs were additionally used for hunting. It is possible that deer were also penned and fattened.

== Maya sites ==
There are hundreds of Maya sites spread across five countries: Belize, El Salvador, Guatemala, Honduras and Mexico. The six sites with particularly outstanding architecture or sculpture are Chichen Itza, Palenque, Uxmal, and Yaxchilan in Mexico, Tikal in Guatemala and Copán in Honduras. Other important, but difficult to reach, sites include Calakmul and El Mirador. The principal sites in the Puuc region, after Uxmal, are Kabah, Labna, and Sayil. In the east of the Yucatán Peninsula are Coba and the small site of Tulum. The Río Bec sites of the base of the peninsula include Becan, Chicanná, Kohunlich, and Xpuhil. The most noteworthy sites in Chiapas, other than Palenque and Yaxchilan, are Bonampak and Toniná. In the Guatemalan Highlands are Iximche, Kaminaljuyu, Mixco Viejo, and Qʼumarkaj (also known as Utatlán). In the northern Petén lowlands of Guatemala there are many sites, though apart from Tikal access is generally difficult. Some of the Petén sites are Dos Pilas, Seibal, and Uaxactún. Important sites in Belize include Altun Ha, Caracol, and Xunantunich.

== Genetics ==
Researchers in 2024 analysed the genomes of ancient individuals from the Maya city at Chichén Itzá dating to around AD 500–900 and compared it with data elaborated from blood samples taken from 68 present-day individuals from Tixcacaltuyub, Mexico. Results revealed they grouped together with modern Amerindian populations (especially the present day Maya) based on PCA and Admixture analysis. The 68 modern-day inhabitants were average modelled as 92% Indigenous American component, with 7% of European genetic contribution and 0.03% African ancestry.

== Museum collections ==
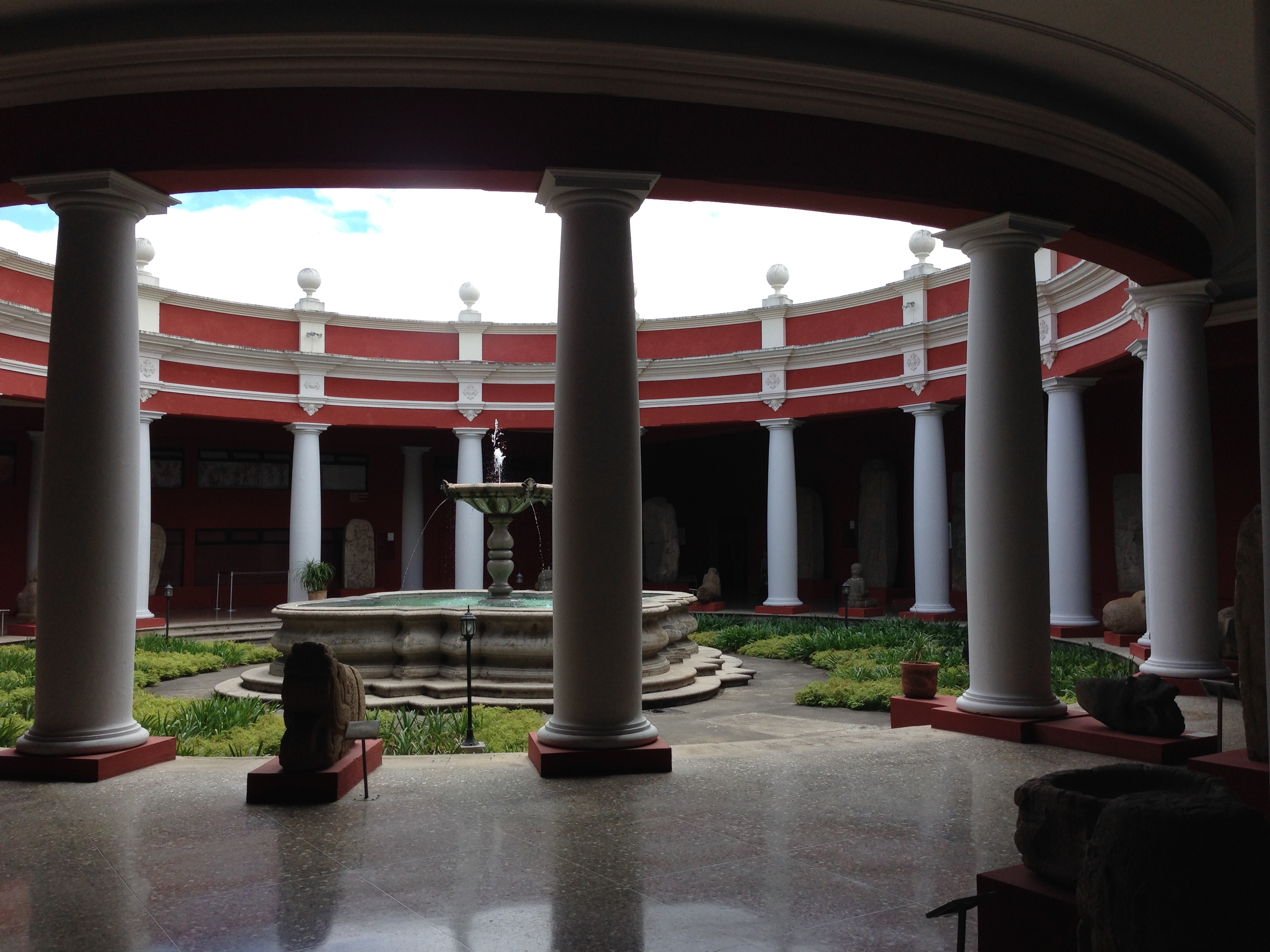
The Museo Nacional de Arqueología y Etnología, in Guatemala City

There are many museums across the world with Maya artefacts in their collections. The Foundation for the Advancement of Mesoamerican Studies lists over 250 museums in its Maya Museum database, and the European Association of Mayanists lists just under 50 museums in Europe alone.

== See also ==
- Entheogenics and the Maya
- Huastec civilization
- Maya codices
- Maya peoples
- Maya music
- Songs of Dzitbalché

== Bibliography ==
- Abrams, Elliot M. (1994). How the Maya Built Their World: Energetics and Ancient Architecture. Austin: University of Texas Press. ISBN 978-0-292-70461-9. OCLC 29564628.
- Adams, Richard E. W. (2005) [1977]. Prehistoric Mesoamerica (3rd ed.). Norman: University of Oklahoma Press. ISBN 978-0-8061-3702-5. OCLC 58975830.
- Adams, R. E. W.; W. E. Brown; T. Patrick Culbert (25 September 1981). "Radar mapping, Archaeology, and Ancient Maya Land Use" (PDF). Science. New Series. 213 (4515): 1457–1463. Bibcode:1981Sci...213.1457A. doi:10.1126/science.213.4515.1457. ISSN 1095-9203. OCLC 863047799. PMID 17780866. S2CID 24698299. Archived from the original (PDF) on 12 March 2015.
- Andrews, Anthony P. (Winter 1984). "The Political Geography of the Sixteenth Century Yucatan Maya: Comments and Revisions". Journal of Anthropological Research. 40 (4): 589–596. doi:10.1086/jar.40.4.3629799. ISSN 0091-7710. JSTOR 3629799. OCLC 1787802. S2CID 163743879.
- Aoyama, Kazuo (July 2005). "Classic Maya Warfare and Weapons: Spear, dart, and arrow points of Aguateca and Copan". Ancient Mesoamerica. 16 (2): 291–304. doi:10.1017/S0956536105050248. ISSN 0956-5361. OCLC 43698811. S2CID 162394344.
- Arroyo, Bárbara (July–August 2001). Enrique Vela (ed.). "El Poslclásico Tardío en los Altos de Guatemala" [The Late Postclassic in the Guatemalan Highlands]. Arqueología Mexicana (in Spanish). IX (50): 38–43. ISSN 0188-8218. OCLC 40772247.
- "Scientists discover ancient Mayan city hidden under Guatemalan jungle". The Guardian. Associated Press. 2018.
- Becker, Marshall Joseph (2004). "Maya Heterarchy as Inferred from Classic-Period Plaza Plans". Ancient Mesoamerica. 15: 127–138. doi:10.1017/S0956536104151079. ISSN 0956-5361. OCLC 43698811. S2CID 162497874.
- Berlo, Janet Catherine (1989). "Early Writing in Central Mexico: In Tlilli, In Tlapalli before A.D. 1000". In Richard A. Diehl; Janet Catherine Berlo (eds.). Mesoamerica after the Decline of Teotihuacan, A.D. 700–900. Washington, D.C.: Dumbarton Oaks, Trustees for Harvard University. pp. 19–48. ISBN 978-0-88402-175-9. OCLC 18557289.
- Blanton, Richard E.; Stephen A. Kowalewski; Gary M. Feinman; Laura M. Finsten (1993) [1981]. Ancient Mesoamerica: A Comparison of Change in Three Regions. Cambridge: Cambridge University Press. ISBN 978-0-521-44053-0. OCLC 470193044.
- Blume, Anna (March 2011). "Maya Concepts of Zero". Proceedings of the American Philosophical Society. 155 (1): 51–88. ISSN 0003-049X. JSTOR 23056849. OCLC 1480553.
- Bricker, Victoria R. (December 2007). "A Quarter-Century of Mayan Linguistics". Mexicon. 29 (6): 138–47. ISSN 0720-5988. JSTOR 23759758. OCLC 5821915.
- Brittenham, Claudia (Spring–Autumn 2009). Francesco Pellizzi (ed.). "Style and substance, or why the Cacaxtla paintings were buried". Res: Anthropology and Aesthetics. 55/56 Absconding. Cambridge, Massachusetts: The Peabody Museum of Archaeology and Ethnology and the Harvard Art Museum: 135–55. doi:10.1086/RESvn1ms25608840. ISBN 978-0-87365-854-6. ISSN 0277-1322. OCLC 601057415. S2CID 192220187.
- Carmack, Robert M. (2001). Kikʼulmatajem le Kʼicheʼaabʼ: Evolución del Reino Kʼicheʼ [Evolution of the Kʼiche Kingdom] (in Spanish). Guatemala City, Guatemala: Cholsamaj. ISBN 978-99922-56-22-0. OCLC 253481949.
- Carter, Nicholas P. (2014). "Sources and Scales of Classic Maya History". In Kurt Raaflaub (ed.). Thinking, Recording, and Writing History in the Ancient World. New York: Wiley-Blackwell. pp. 340–71.
- Caso Barrera, Laura; Mario Aliphat Fernández (2006). "Cacao, vanilla and annatto: three production and exchange systems in the Southern Maya lowlands, XVI–XVII centuries". Journal of Latin American Geography. 5 (2): 29–52. doi:10.1353/lag.2006.0015. ISSN 1545-2476. JSTOR 25765138. OCLC 356573308. S2CID 201743707.
- Caso Barrera, Laura; Aliphat, Mario (2007). J. P. Laporte; B. Arroyo; H. Mejía (eds.). "Relaciones de Verapaz y las Tierras Bajas Mayas Centrales en el siglo XVII" [Relation between Verapaz and the Central Maya Lowlands in the 17th Century] (PDF). Simposio de Investigaciones Arqueológicas en Guatemala (in Spanish). XX (2006): 48–58. OCLC 173275417. Archived from the original (PDF) on 17 October 2013.
- Chase, Arlen F.; Diane Z. Chase (2012). "Complex Societies in the Southern Maya Lowlands: Their Development and Florescence in the Archaeological Record". In Deborah L. Nichols; Christopher A. Pool (eds.). The Oxford Handbook of Mesoamerican Archaeology. New York: Oxford University Press. pp. 255–67. ISBN 978-0-19-539093-3. OCLC 761538187.
- Christenson, Allen J. (2007) [2003]. "Popul Vuh: Sacred Book of the Quiché Maya People" (PDF). Mesoweb articles. Mesoweb: An Exploration of Mesoamerican Cultures. Archived from the original (PDF) on 24 October 2014.
- Christie, Jessica Joyce (2003). "Conclusions". In Jessica Joyce Christie (ed.). Maya Palaces and Elite Residences: An interdisciplinary approach. Linda Schele series in Maya and pre-Columbian studies. Austin: University of Texas Press. pp. 315–336. ISBN 978-0-292-71244-7. OCLC 55889753.
- Cioffi-Revilla, Claudio; Todd Landman (December 1999). "Evolution of Maya Polities in the Ancient Mesoamerican System" (PDF). International Studies Quarterly. 43 (4): 559–598. doi:10.1111/0020-8833.00137. ISSN 1468-2478. JSTOR 3014022. OCLC 52067195.
- Coe, Michael D. (1994) [1992]. Breaking the Maya Code. London: Thames & Hudson. ISBN 978-0-14-023481-7. OCLC 31288285.
- Coe, Michael D. (1999). The Maya (Sixth ed.). New York: Thames & Hudson. ISBN 978-0-500-28066-9. OCLC 40771862.
- Colas, Pierre R.; Alexander Voß (2011) [2006]. "Un juego de vida o muerte: El juego de pelota maya". In Nikolai Grube (ed.). Los Mayas: Una Civilización Milenaria [A Game of Life or Death: The Maya Ballgame] (hardback) (in Spanish). Potsdam, Germany: Tandem Verlag. pp. 186–91. ISBN 978-3-8331-6293-0. OCLC 828120761.
- Colunga-García Marín, Patricia; Daniel Zizumbo-Villarreal (Winter 2004). "Domestication of Plants in Maya Lowlands". Economic Botany. 58, Supplement: S101–S110. doi:10.1663/0013-0001(2004)58[s101:dopiml]2.0.co;2. JSTOR 4256911. S2CID 25771956.
- D'Arcy Harrison, Peter (2003). "Palaces of the Royal Court at Tikal". In Jessica Joyce Christie (ed.). Maya Palaces and Elite Residences: An interdisciplinary approach. Linda Schele series in Maya and pre-Columbian studies. Austin, Texas: University of Texas Press. pp. 98–119. ISBN 978-0-292-71244-7. OCLC 55889753.
- Dahlin, Bruce H.; Christopher T. Jensen; Richard E. Terry; David R. Wright; Timothy Beach (December 2007). "In Search of an Ancient Maya Market". Latin American Antiquity. 18 (4): 363–84. doi:10.2307/25478193. ISSN 2325-5080. JSTOR 25478193. S2CID 161238112.
- del Águila Flores, Patricia (2007). "Zaculeu: Ciudad Postclásica en las Tierras Altas Mayas de Guatemala" [Zaculeu: Postclassic City in the Maya Highlands of Guatemala] (PDF) (in Spanish). Guatemala City, Guatemala: Ministerio de Cultura y Deportes. OCLC 277021068. Archived from the original (PDF) on 21 July 2011.
- Demarest, Arthur (2004). Ancient Maya: The Rise and Fall of a Rainforest Civilization. Cambridge, UK: Cambridge University Press. ISBN 978-0-521-53390-4. OCLC 51438896.
- Demarest, Arthur A.; Tomás, Barrientos; Federico Fahsen (2006). Laporte, J.P.; Arroyo, B.; Mejía, H. (eds.). "El apogeo y el Colapso del reinado de Cancuen: Resultados e interpretaciones del Proyecto Cancuen, 2004–2005" [The Apogee and Collapse of the Kingdom of Cancuen: Results and Interpretations of the Cancuen Project, 2004–2005] (PDF). Simposio de Investigaciones Arqueológicas en Guatemala (in Spanish). XIX (2005): 826–37. OCLC 71050804. Archived from the original (PDF) on 23 September 2015.
- Diehl, Richard A. (2004). The Olmecs: America's First Civilization. Ancient peoples and places series. London: Thames & Hudson. ISBN 978-0-500-02119-4. OCLC 56746987.
- Doyle, James A. (December 2012). "Regroup on "E-Groups": Monumentality and Early Centers in the Middle Preclassic Maya Lowlands". Latin American Antiquity. 23 (4): 355–79. doi:10.7183/1045-6635.23.4.355. ISSN 2325-5080. JSTOR 23645603. OCLC 54395676. S2CID 164102473.
- Drew, David (1999). The Lost Chronicles of the Maya Kings. London, UK: Phoenix Press. ISBN 978-0-7538-0989-1. OCLC 59565970.
- Ellsworth Hamann, Byron (March 2008). "How Maya Hieroglyphs Got Their Name: Egypt, Mexico, and China in Western Grammatology since the Fifteenth Century". Proceedings of the American Philosophical Society. 152 (1). ISSN 0003-049X. OCLC 1480557.
- Emboden, William A. (1 January 1979). "Nymphaea ampla and other Narcotics in Maya Ritual and Shamanism". Mexicon. 1 (4): 50–52. ISSN 0720-5988. JSTOR 23757393. OCLC 5821915.
- Emmerich, André (2005). "Improving the Odds: Preservation through Distribution". In Kate Fitz Gibbon (ed.). Who Owns the Past?: Cultural Policy, Cultural Property, and the Law. New Brunswick, New Jersey and London: Rutgers University Press. ISBN 978-0-8135-3687-3. OCLC 57893247.
- Estrada-Belli, Francisco (2011). The First Maya Civilization: Ritual and Power Before the Classic Period. Abingdonm and New York: Routledge. ISBN 978-0-415-42994-8. OCLC 614990197.
- Finley, Michael John. "Maya Astronomy". ircamera.as.arizona.edu. Department of Astronomy and Steward Observatory, University of Arizona. Archived from the original on 23 October 2020.
- Fisher, Chelsea (December 2014). "The role of infield agriculture in Maya cities". Journal of Anthropological Archaeology. 36: 196–210. doi:10.1016/j.jaa.2014.10.001.
- Foias, Antonia E. (2014) [2013]. Ancient Maya Political Dynamics. Gainesville: University Press of Florida. ISBN 978-0-8130-6089-7. OCLC 878111565.
- Forsyth, Donald W. (1993). J. P. Laporte; H. Escobedo; S. Villagrán de Brady (eds.). "La arquitectura Preclásica en Nakbe: Un estudio comparativo de dos periodos" [The Preclassic Architecture of Nakbe: A Comparative Study of Two Periods] (PDF). Simposio de Investigaciones Arqueológicas en Guatemala (in Spanish). VI (1992): 113–21. OCLC 30671693. Archived from the original (PDF) on 4 September 2011.
- Foster, Lynn (2002). Handbook to Life in the Ancient Maya World. New York: Oxford University Press. ISBN 978-0-19-518363-4. OCLC 57319740.
- Fox, John W. (2008) [1987]. Maya Postclassic state formation. Cambridge, UK and New York: Cambridge University Press. ISBN 978-0-521-10195-0. OCLC 297146853.
- Freidel, David A.; Linda Schele; Joy Parker (1993). Maya Cosmos: Three Thousand Years on the Shaman's Path. New York: William Morrow & Co. ISBN 978-0-688-10081-0. OCLC 27430287.
- Fuente, Beatriz de la; Leticia Staines Cicero & Alfonso Arellano Hernández (1999). "Art: Sentries of Eternity". In A. Arellano Hernández; et al. (eds.). The Mayas of the Classic Period. Mexico City, Mexico: Consejo Nacional para la Cultura y las Artes (CONACULTA). pp. 141–226. ISBN 978-970-18-3005-5. OCLC 42213077.
- Gillespie, Susan D. (1991). "Ballgames and Boundaries". In Vernon Scarborough; David R. Wilcox (eds.). The Mesoamerican Ballgame. Tucson, Arizona: University of Arizona Press. pp. 317–45. ISBN 978-0-8165-1360-4. OCLC 51873028.
- Gillespie, Susan D. (September 2000). "Rethinking Ancient Maya Social Organization: Replacing "Lineage" with "House"". American Anthropologist. 102 (3): 467–484. doi:10.1525/aa.2000.102.3.467. ISSN 0002-7294. JSTOR 683405. OCLC 1479294.
- Guillemín, Jorge F. (1965). Iximché: Capital del Antiguo Reino Cakchiquel [Iximche: Capital of the Ancient Kaqchikel Kingdom] (in Spanish). Guatemala City, Guatemala: Tipografía Nacional de Guatemala. OCLC 1498320.
- Hammond, Norman; Duncan Pring; Rainer Berger; V. R. Switsur; A. P. Ward (15 April 1976). "Radiocarbon chronology for early Maya occupation at Cuello, Belize". Nature. 260 (5552): 579–581. Bibcode:1976Natur.260..579H. doi:10.1038/260579a0. ISSN 0028-0836. S2CID 4270766.
- Hansen, Richard D. (1991). J.P. Laporte; S. Villagrán; H. Escobedo; D. de González; J. Valdés (eds.). "Resultados preliminares de las investigaciones arqueológicas en el sitio Nakbe, Petén, Guatemala" [Preliminary Results of the Archaeological Investigations of Nakbe, Peten, Guatemala] (PDF). Simposio de Investigaciones Arqueológicas en Guatemala (in Spanish). II (1988): 163–178. OCLC 27267772. Archived from the original (PDF) on 7 July 2011.
- Hansen, Richard D. (1998). "Continuity and Disjunction: The Pre-Classic Antecedents of Classic Maya Architecture" (PDF). In Stephen D. Houston (ed.). Function and Meaning in Classic Maya Architecture. Washington, DC: Dumbarton Oaks Research Library and Collection. pp. 49–122. ISBN 978-0-88402-254-1. OCLC 318200121. Archived from the original (PDF) on 10 June 2015.
- Helmke, Christophe (2020). "Tactics, Trophies, and Titles: A Comparative Perspective on Ancient Maya Raiding". Ancient Mesoamerica. 31 (1): 29–46. JSTOR. JSTOR 27343810.
- Hohmann-Vogrin (2011) [2006]. "Unidad de espacio y tiempo: la arquitectura Maya". In Nikolai Grube (ed.). Los Mayas: Una Civilización Milenaria [Unity of Space and Time: Maya Architecture] (hardback) (in Spanish). Potsdam: Tandem Verlag. pp. 194–215. ISBN 978-3-8331-6293-0. OCLC 828120761.
- Houston, Stephen; John Robertson; David Stuart (June 2000). "The Language of Classic Maya Inscriptions". Current Anthropology. 41 (3): 321–356. doi:10.1086/300142. ISSN 0011-3204. JSTOR 10.1086/300142. PMID 10768879. S2CID 741601.
- Hutson, Scott R. (December 2011). "The Art of Becoming: The Graffiti of Tikal, Guatemala". Latin American Antiquity. 22 (4): 403–426. doi:10.7183/1045-6635.22.4.403. ISSN 2325-5080. JSTOR 23072567. S2CID 163256732.
- Jackson, Sarah E. (2013). Politics of the Maya Court: Hierarchy and Change in the Late Classic Period. Norman, Oklahoma: University of Oklahoma Press. ISBN 978-0-8061-4341-5. OCLC 813300656.
- Jones, Grant D. (1998). The Conquest of the Last Maya Kingdom. Stanford, California: Stanford University Press. ISBN 978-0-8047-3522-3.
- Justeson, John (2010). "Numerical cognition and the development of 'zero' in Mesoamerica". The Archaeology of Measurement: Comprehending Heaven, Earth and Time in Ancient Societies. New York: Cambridge University Press. pp. 43–53. ISBN 978-0-521-11990-0. OCLC 501396677.
- Kettunen, Harri; Helmke, Christopher (2008). "Introduction to Maya Hieroglyphs: Workshop handbook" (PDF). Mesoweb articles. Mesoweb: An Exploration of Mesoamerican Cultures. Archived from the original (PDF) on 8 August 2014.
- Kimbell Art Museum (2015). "Presentation of Captives to a Maya Ruler". Fort Worth, Texas: Kimbell Art Museum. Archived from the original on 7 March 2015.
- Koch, Peter O. (2013). John Lloyd Stephens and Frederick Catherwood: Pioneers of Mayan Archaeology. Jefferson, North Carolina: McFarland. ISBN 978-0-7864-7107-2. OCLC 824359844.
- Kristan-Graham, Cynthia; Jeff Karl Kowalski (2007). "Chichén Itzá, Tula, and Tollan: Changing Perspectives on a Recurring Problem in Mesoamerican Archaeology and Art History". Twin Tollans: Chichén Itzá, Tula, and the Epiclassic to Early Postclassic Mesoamerican World. Washington, DC: Trustees for Harvard University. pp. 13–84. ISBN 978-0-88402-323-4. OCLC 71243931.
- Laporte, Juan Pedro; Vilma Fialko (1994). J.P. Laporte; H. Escobedo (eds.). "Mundo Perdido, Tikal: Los enunciados actuales" [Mundo Perdido, Tikal: Current questions] (PDF). Simposio de Investigaciones Arqueológicas en Guatemala (in Spanish). VII (1993): 335–48. OCLC 33865804. Archived from the original (PDF) on 15 September 2011.
- Looper, Matthew G. (1999). "New Perspectives on the Late Classic Political History of Quirigua, Guatemala". Ancient Mesoamerica. 10 (2): 263–280. doi:10.1017/S0956536199101135. ISSN 0956-5361. OCLC 86542758. S2CID 161977572.
- Looper, Matthew G. (2003). Lightning Warrior: Maya Art and Kingship at Quirigua. Linda Schele series in Maya and pre-Columbian studies. Austin: University of Texas Press. ISBN 978-0-292-70556-2. OCLC 52208614.
- Love, Michael (December 2007). "Recent Research in the Southern Highlands and Pacific Coast of Mesoamerica". Journal of Archaeological Research. 15 (4): 275–328. doi:10.1007/s10814-007-9014-y. ISSN 1573-7756. S2CID 144511056.
- Lovell, W. George (2000). "The Highland Maya". In Richard E.W. Adams; Murdo J. Macleod (eds.). The Cambridge History of the Native Peoples of the Americas, Vol. II: Mesoamerica, part 2. Cambridge: Cambridge University Press. pp. 392–444. ISBN 978-0-521-65204-9. OCLC 33359444.
- Lovell, W. George (2005). Conquest and Survival in Colonial Guatemala: A Historical Geography of the Cuchumatán Highlands, 1500–1821 (3rd ed.). Montreal, Canada: McGill-Queen's University Press. ISBN 978-0-7735-2741-6. OCLC 58051691.
- Macri, Martha J.; Matthew George Looper (2003). The New Catalog of Maya Hieroglyphs. The civilization of the American Indian series. Vol. 1: The Classic period inscriptions. Norman, Oklahoma: University of Oklahoma Press. ISBN 978-0-8061-3497-0. OCLC 773482216.
- Marcus, Joyce (2004a). "Maya Commoners: The Stereotype and the Reality" (PDF). In Jon C. Lohse; Fred Valdez Jr. (eds.). Ancient Maya Commoners. Austin: University of Texas Press. pp. 255–84. ISBN 978-0-292-70571-5. OCLC 60745417 – via Project MUSE.
- Marcus, Joyce (2004) [2003]. "The Maya and Teotihuacan". In Geoffrey E. Braswell (ed.). The Maya and Teotihuacan : reinterpreting early classic interaction. Austin: University of Texas Press. pp. 337–356. ISBN 978-0-292-70587-6. OCLC 254181446.
- Martin, Simon; Nikolai Grube (2000). Chronicle of the Maya Kings and Queens: Deciphering the Dynasties of the Ancient Maya. London and New York: Thames & Hudson. ISBN 978-0-500-05103-0. OCLC 47358325.
- Masson, Marilyn A.; Carlos Peraza Lope (2004). "Commoners in Postclassic Maya society: Social versus economic class constructs". In Jon C. Lohse; Fred Valdez Jr. (eds.). Ancient Maya Commoners. Austin: University of Texas Press. pp. 197–223. ISBN 978-0-292-70571-5. OCLC 803179517.
- Masson, Marilyn A. (6 November 2012). "Maya collapse cycles". Proceedings of the National Academy of Sciences of the United States of America. 109 (45): 18237–18238. Bibcode:2012PNAS..10918237M. doi:10.1073/pnas.1213638109. ISSN 1091-6490. JSTOR 41829886. PMC 3494883. PMID 22992650.
- Masson, Marilyn A.; Carlos Peraza Lope (2014). "Militarism, Misery and Collapse". In Marilyn A. Masson; Carlos Peraza Lope (eds.). Kukulcan's Realm: Urban Life at Ancient Mayapán. Boulder: University Press of Colorado. ISBN 978-1-60732-319-8. OCLC 892430422.
- Matthew, Laura E. (2012). Memories of Conquest: Becoming Mexicano in Colonial Guatemala (hardback). First Peoples. Chapel Hill: University of North Carolina Press. ISBN 978-0-8078-3537-1. OCLC 752286995.
- McVicker, Donald (January 1985). "The "Mayanized" Mexicans". American Antiquity. 50 (1): 82–101. doi:10.2307/280635. ISSN 2325-5080. JSTOR 280635. S2CID 163756728.
- Milbrath, Susan (1999). "Stars, the Milky Way, Comets, and Meteors" (PDF). Star Gods of the Maya: Astronomy in Art, Folklore, and Calendars. Austin: University of Texas Press. pp. 249–293. ISBN 978-0-292-75225-2. OCLC 40848420 – via Project MUSE.
- Miles, Susanna W. (1952). "An Analysis of the Modern Middle American Calendars: A Study in Conservation". In Sol Tax (ed.). Acculturation in the Americas. Proceedings and selected papers of the International Congress of Americanists. Chicago: University of Chicago Press. pp. 273–284. OCLC 180504894.
- Miller, Mary (1999). Maya Art and Architecture. London and New York: Thames & Hudson. ISBN 978-0-500-20327-9. OCLC 41659173.
- Miller, Mary; Karl Taube (1993). The Gods and Symbols of Ancient Mexico and the Maya. Londo: Thames and Hudson. ISBN 978-0-500-05068-2. OCLC 901448866.
- Oakley, Francis; Rubin, Benjamin B. (2012). "Sacral Kingship and the Origins of Religious, Social, and Political Orders". In Patrick McNamara; Wesley J. Wildman (eds.). Science and the World's Religions: Origins and Destinies. Vol. 1. Santa Barbara, California: Praeger/ABC-CLIO. pp. 69–90. ISBN 978-0-313-38732-6. OCLC 768417915.
- Olmedo Vera, Bertina (1997). A. Arellano Hernández; et al. (eds.). The Mayas of the Classic Period. Mexico City: Consejo Nacional para la Cultura y las Artes (CONACULTA). pp. 9–99. ISBN 978-970-18-3005-5. OCLC 42213077.
- Phillips, Charles (2007) [2006]. The Complete Illustrated History of the Aztecs & Maya: The definitive chronicle of the ancient peoples of Central America & Mexico – including the Aztec, Maya, Olmec, Mixtec, Toltec & Zapotec. London: Anness Publishing Ltd. ISBN 978-1-84681-197-5. OCLC 642211652.
- Popenoe de Hatch, Marion; Christa Schieber de Lavarreda (2001). J.P. Laporte; A.C. Suasnávar; B. Arroyo (eds.). "Una revisión preliminar de la historia de Takʼalik Abʼaj, departamento de Retalhuleu" [A Preliminary Revision of the History of Takalik Abaj, Retalhuleu Department] (PDF). Simposio de Investigaciones Arqueológicas en Guatemala (in Spanish). XIV (2000): 990–1005. OCLC 49563126. Archived from the original (PDF) on 11 December 2009.
- Pugh, Timothy W.; Leslie G. Cecil (2012). "The contact period of central Petén, Guatemala in color". Social and Cultural Analysis, Department of. Faculty Publications. Paper 6.
- Quezada, Sergio (2011). La colonización de los mayas peninsulares [The Colonization of the Peninsula Maya] (PDF). Biblioteca Básica de Yucatán (in Spanish). Vol. 18. Merida, Yucatan, Mexico: Secretaría de Educación del Gobierno del Estado de Yucatán. ISBN 978-607-7824-27-5. OCLC 796677890. Archived from the original (PDF) on 4 November 2013.
- Recinos, Adrian (1986) [1952]. Pedro de Alvarado: Conquistador de México y Guatemala [Pedro de Alvarado: Conqueror of Mexico and Guatemala] (in Spanish) (2nd ed.). Antigua Guatemala, Guatemala: CENALTEX Centro Nacional de Libros de Texto y Material Didáctico 'José de Pineda Ibarra'. OCLC 243309954.
- Reents-Budet, Dorie; Antonia E. Foias; Ronald L. Bishop; M. James Blackman; Stanley Guenter (2007). J.P. Laporte; B. Arroyo; H. Mejía (eds.). "Interacciones políticas y el Sitio Ikʼ (Motul de San José): Datos de la cerámica" [Political Interactions and the Ikʼ Site (Motul de San Jose): Ceramic Data] (PDF). Simposio de Investigaciones Arqueológicas en Guatemala (in Spanish). XX (2006): 1416–1436. OCLC 173275417. Archived from the original (PDF) on 14 September 2011.
- Restall, Matthew; Florine Asselbergs (2007). Invading Guatemala: Spanish, Nahua, and Maya Accounts of the Conquest Wars. University Parkv: Pennsylvania State University Press. ISBN 978-0-271-02758-6. OCLC 165478850.
- Restall, Matthew; Gabbert Wolfgang (2007). "The Only True People": Linking Maya Identities Past and Present. University Press of Colorado. ISBN 978-1-60732-566-6.
- Rice, Prudence M.; Don S. Rice (2009). "Introduction to the Kowoj and their Petén Neighbors". In Prudence M. Rice; Don S. Rice (eds.). The Kowoj: identity, migration, and geopolitics in late postclassic Petén, Guatemala. Boulder: University Press of Colorado. pp. 3–15. ISBN 978-0-87081-930-8. OCLC 225875268.
- Rice, Prudence M.; Don S. Rice; Timothy W. Pugh; Rómulo Sánchez Polo (2009). "Defensive Architecture and the Context of Warfare at Zacpetén". In Prudence M. Rice; Don S. Rice (eds.). The Kowoj: identity, migration, and geopolitics in late postclassic Petén, Guatemala. Boulder: University Press of Colorado. pp. 123–140. ISBN 978-0-87081-930-8. OCLC 225875268.
- Ros, Narin. "Maya Museum Database". Foundation for the Advancement of Mesoamerican Studies. Archived from the original on 8 July 2014. Full list from FAMSI archived from the original on 2015-06-08.
- Rosenwig, Robert M. (2010). The Beginnings of Mesoamerican Civilization: Inter-Regional Interaction and the Olmec. New York: Cambridge University Press. ISBN 978-0-521-11102-7. OCLC 402542556.
- Ross, Nanci J. (January 2011). "Modern tree species composition reflects ancient Maya 'forest gardens' in northwest Belize". Ecological Applications. 21 (1): 75–84. doi:10.1890/09-0662.1. ISSN 1051-0761. JSTOR 29779638. PMID 21516889.
- Roys, Ralph L. (1933). The Book of Chilam Balam of Chumayel. Washington, D.C.: Carnegie Institution. OCLC 760592295.
- Salisbury, David; Mimi Koumenalis; Barbara Moffett (19 September 2002). "Newly revealed hieroglyphs tell story of superpower conflict in the Maya world" (PDF). Exploration: The Online Research Journal of Vanderbilt University. OCLC 50324967. Archived from the original (PDF) on 2 November 2014.
- Saturno, William A.; David Stuart; Boris Beltrán (3 March 2006). "Early Maya Writing at San Bartolo, Guatemala". Science. New Series. 311 (5765): 1281–1283. Bibcode:2006Sci...311.1281S. doi:10.1126/science.1121745. ISSN 1095-9203. JSTOR 3845835. OCLC 863047799. PMID 16400112. S2CID 46351994.
- Schele, Linda; Peter Mathews (1999). The Code of Kings: The language of seven Maya temples and tombs. New York: Simon & Schuster. ISBN 978-0-684-85209-6. OCLC 41423034.
- SFU Museum of Archaeology and Ethnology. "Featured Artifacts: Mayan Eccentric Flints". Burnaby, British Columbia, Canada: Simon Fraser University Museum of Archaeology and Ethnology. Archived from the original on 2 November 2014.
- Sharer, Robert J. (2000). "The Maya Highlands and the Adjacent Pacific Coast". In Richard E.W. Adams; Murdo J. Macleod (eds.). The Cambridge History of the Native Peoples of the Americas, Vol. II: Mesoamerica, part 1. Cambridge: Cambridge University Press. pp. 449–499. ISBN 978-0-521-35165-2. OCLC 33359444.
- Sharer, Robert J.; Loa P. Traxler (2006). The Ancient Maya (6th, fully revised ed.). Stanford, California: Stanford University Press. ISBN 978-0-8047-4817-9. OCLC 57577446.
- Šprajc, Ivan (2018). "Astronomy, architecture, and landscape in Prehispanic Mesoamerica". Journal of Archaeological Research. 26 (2): 197–251. doi:10.1007/s10814-017-9109-z. S2CID 149439162.
- Stuart, David; George Stuart (2008). Palenque: Eternal City of the Maya. London: Thames & Hudson. ISBN 978-0-500-05156-6. OCLC 227016561.
- Szymanski, Jan (2013). "Between Death and Divinity. Rethinking the Significance of Triadic Groups in Ancient Maya Culture" (PDF). PhD Dissertation. Warsaw: University of Warsaw. Archived from the original (PDF) on 3 November 2014.
- Taladoire, Eric; Benoit Colsenet (1991). "'Bois Ton Sang, Beaumanoir': The Political and Conflictual Aspects of the Ballgame in the Northern Chiapas Area". In Vernon Scarborough; David R. Wilcox (eds.). The Mesoamerican Ballgame. Tucson: University of Arizona Press. pp. 161–74. ISBN 978-0-8165-1360-4. OCLC 51873028.
- Tanaka, Yuki (2008). A Comparative Study of Maya Hieroglyphic Writing and Japanese Orthography in the Quirigua Hieroglyphic Corpus. Ann Arbor, Michigan. ISBN 978-0-549-99989-8.
- Taube, Karl A. (2004) [2003]. "Tetitla and the Maya Presence at Teotihuacan". In Geoffrey E. Braswell (ed.). The Maya and Teotihuacan : reinterpreting early classic interaction. Austin: University of Texas Press. pp. 273–314. ISBN 978-0-292-70587-6. OCLC 254181446.
- Tedlock, Barbara (1992) [1982]. Time and the Highland Maya (Revised ed.). Albuquerque, New Mexico: University of New Mexico Press. ISBN 978-0-8263-1358-4. OCLC 45732799.
- Thompson, J. Eric S. (July–September 1932). "A Maya Calendar from the Alta Vera Paz, Guatemala". American Anthropologist. New Series. 34 (3): 449–454. doi:10.1525/aa.1932.34.3.02a00090. ISSN 0002-7294. JSTOR 661903. OCLC 1479294.
- Thompson, J. Eric S. (1966). "The Maya Central Area at the Spanish Conquest and Later: A Problem in Demography". Proceedings of the Royal Anthropological Institute of Great Britain and Ireland (1966): 23–37. doi:10.2307/3031712. JSTOR 3031712.
- Thompson, J. Eric S. (1990) [1970]. Maya History and Religion. Norman: University of Oklahoma Press. ISBN 978-0-8061-2247-2. OCLC 715926981.
- Thompson, J. Eric S. (2 May 1974). "Maya Astronomy". Philosophical Transactions of the Royal Society of London. Series A, Mathematical and Physical Sciences. 276 (1257, The Place of Astronomy in the Ancient World): 83–98. Bibcode:1974RSPTA.276...83T. doi:10.1098/rsta.1974.0011. ISSN 0261-0523. JSTOR 74276. S2CID 202574557.
- Tiesler, Vera; Andrea Cucina (December 2006). "Procedures in Human Heart Extraction and Ritual Meaning: A Taphonomic Assessment of Anthropogenic Marks in Classic Maya Skeletons". Latin American Antiquity. 17 (4): 493–510. doi:10.2307/25063069. ISSN 2325-5080. JSTOR 25063069. S2CID 163730170.
- Tobin, Thomas J. (2001). "The Construction of the Codex in Classic- and Postclassic-Period Maya Civilization". Pittsburgh: Duquesne University. Archived from the original on 17 October 2002.
- Valdés, Juan Antonio (1994). J.P. Laporte; H. Escobedo; S. Villagrán (eds.). "El Grupo A de Uaxactun: Manifestaciones arquitectónicas y dinásticas durante el Clásico Temprano" [Uaxactun Group A: Architectural Manifestations and Dynasties during the Early Classic] (PDF). I Simposio de Investigaciones Arqueológicas en Guatemala, 1987 (in Spanish): 98–111. OCLC 31177419. Archived from the original (PDF) on 3 November 2014.
- Van Stone, Mark (2011). "It's not the End of the World: emic evidence for local diversity in the Maya Long Count". Proceedings of the International Astronomical Union. 7 (278): 186–191. Bibcode:2011IAUS..278..186V. doi:10.1017/S1743921311012610.
- Van Stone, Mark (January 2016). "What We Think We Know About Maya Mathematics and Astronomy". Inspiration of Astronomical Phenomena VIII: City of Stars. 501: 265. Bibcode:2016ASPC..501..265V. ISSN 1050-3390.
- Viqueira, Juan Pedro (2004) [1995]. "Chiapas y sus regiones" [Chiapas and its Regions]. In Juan Pedro Viqueira; Mario Humberto Ruz (eds.). Chiapas: los rumbos de otra historia [Chiapas: The courses of a different history] (in Spanish). Mexico City: Centro de Investigaciones Filológicas with Centro de Investigaciones y Estudios Superiores en Antropología Social (CIESAS). pp. 19–40. ISBN 978-968-36-4836-5. OCLC 36759921.
- WAYEB. "Museums & Collections". European Association of Mayanists (WAYEB). Archived from the original on 11 May 2015.
- Webster, David (March 2000). "The Not So Peaceful Civilization: A Review of Maya War". Journal of World Prehistory. 14 (1): 65–119. doi:10.1023/a:1007813518630. ISSN 1573-7802. JSTOR 25801154. S2CID 159563593.
- Webster, David; William L. Fash Jr.; Claude F. Baudez; Berthold Riese; William T. Sanders (1989). "The House of the Bacabs, Copan, Honduras". Studies in Pre-Columbian Art and Archaeology (29). Dumbarton Oaks, Trustees for Harvard University: i–iv, 1–111, 113–116. ISBN 978-0-88402-177-3. JSTOR 41263469. OCLC 18557303.
- Williams, Josh (2010). "Mississippian and Maya Eccentric Flints". Springfield: Board of Governors, Missouri State University. Archived from the original on 2 November 2014.
- Wise, Terence; McBride, Angus (2008) [1980]. The Conquistadores. Men-at-Arms. Vol. 101. Oxford and New York: Osprey Publishing. ISBN 978-0-85045-357-7. OCLC 12782941.
- Witschey, Walter R. T.; Clifford T. Brown (2012). Historical Dictionary of Mesoamerica. Plymouth, Devon, UK: Scarecrow Press. ISBN 978-0-8108-7167-0. OCLC 754105610.
- Zorich, Zach (November–December 2012). "The Maya Sense of Time". Archaeology. Vol. 65, no. 6. New York: Archaeological Institute of America. pp. 25–29. ISSN 0003-8113. JSTOR 41804605. OCLC 1481828.
