= Costa Maya =

Tourist region in Quintana Roo, Mexico

Coordinates: 18.714°N 87.709°W

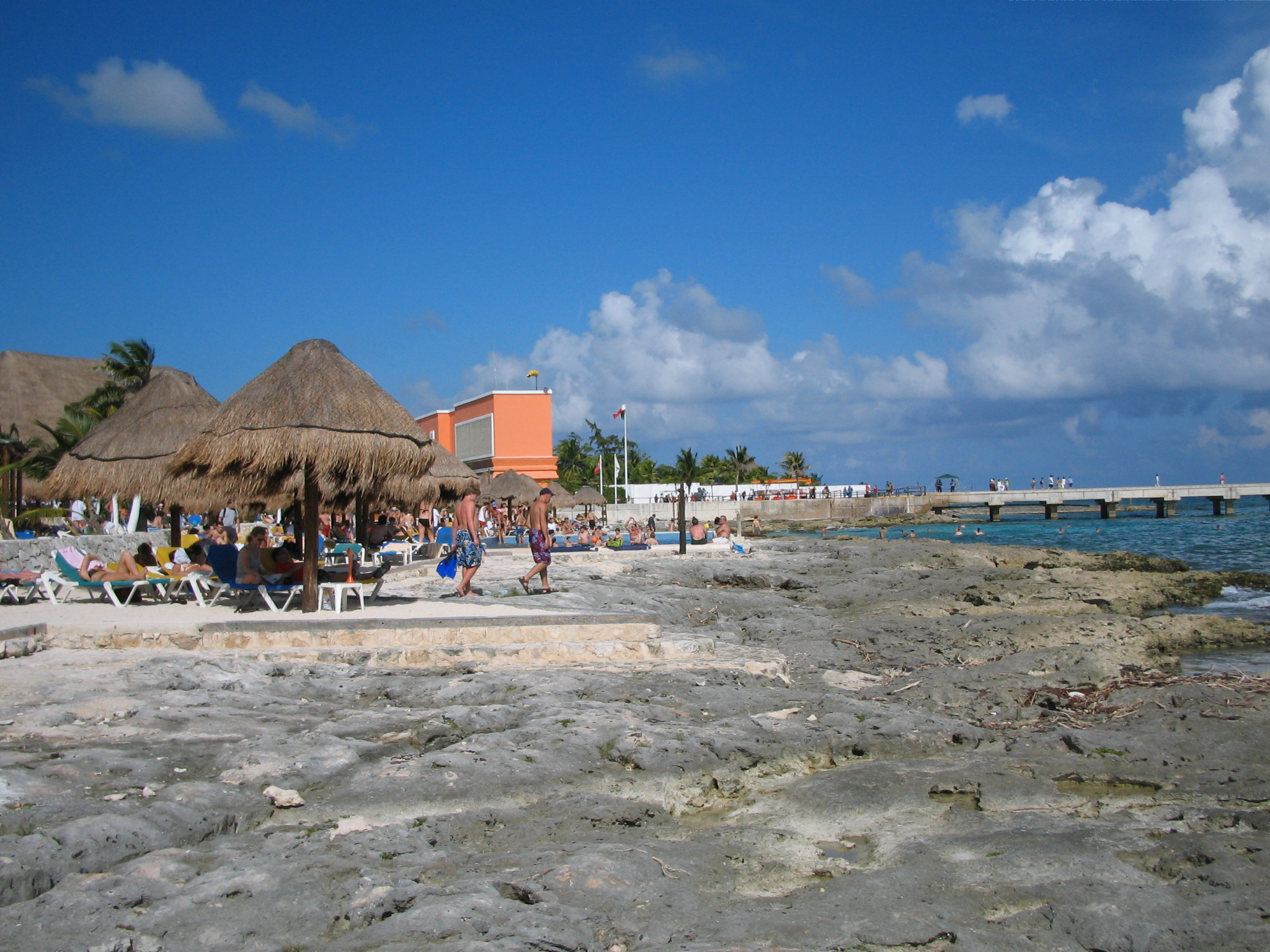
The beach at Costa Maya Port, looking toward the cruise ship pier

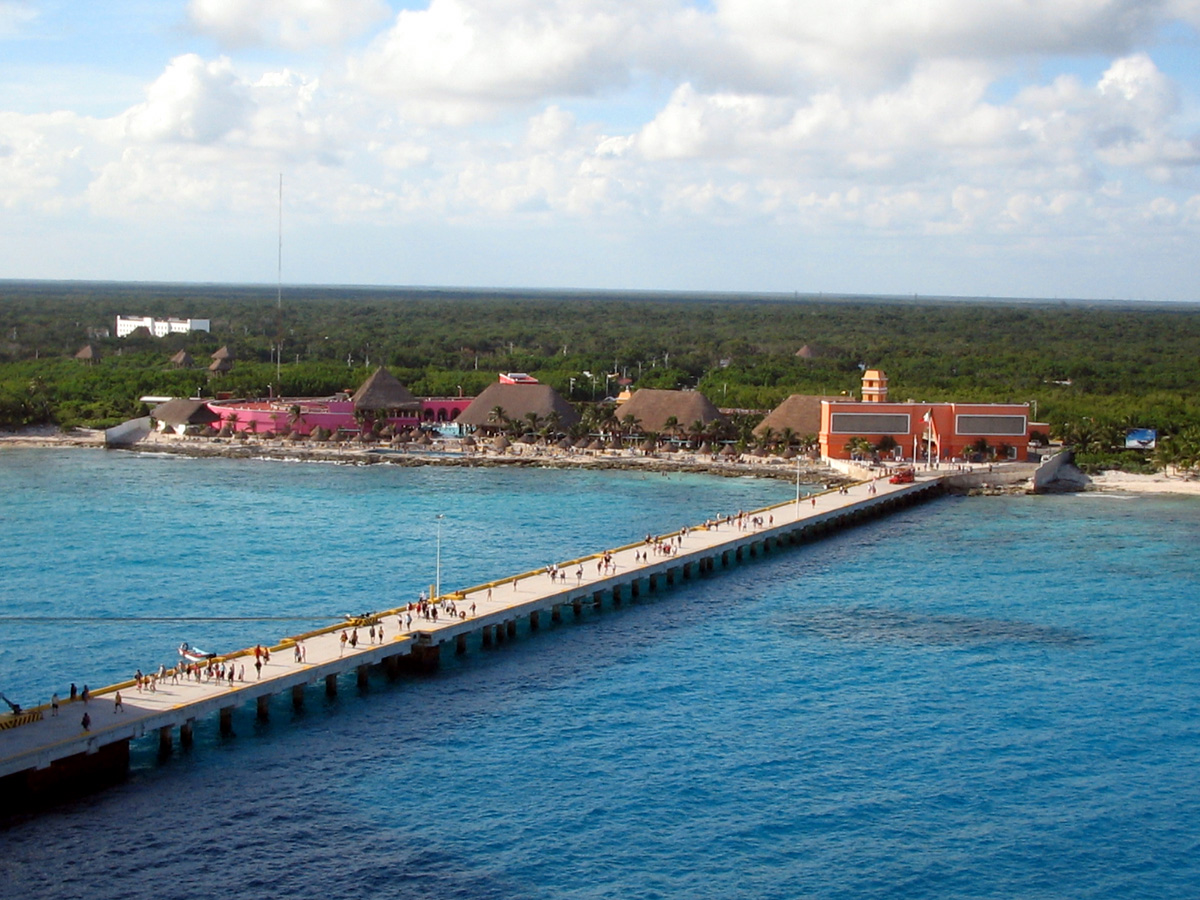
The resort of Costa Maya Port viewed from a cruise ship docked at the pier

Costa Maya is a small tourist region in the municipality of Othón P. Blanco in the state of Quintana Roo, Mexico, the only state bounded by the Caribbean Sea to its east. This municipality is close to Chetumal (capital of the state) on the border with Belize. The area was generally undeveloped but has been growing rapidly since construction of a large pier to accommodate cruise ships. Costa Maya is also the name of a subdivision near the village of Mahahual. The beach extends from Xcalak in the south to the southern border of Sian Ka'an in the north, a distance of approximately 100 kilometers (62 mi).

Xcalak is approximately 60 kilometers (37 mi) south of the Costa Maya cruise port, and the fishing village of Mahahual is only about 3 kilometers (1.9 mi) away. Cruise ships can easily be seen from the village. Mahahual has soft sand beaches, grass thatched palapas, and a coral reef a short distance off-shore called Banco Chinchorro, as well as several bars, restaurants, and shops. A new development called New Mahahual is being created directly inland from the port. When ships are in port, the village is busy with cruise passengers.

Costa Maya's port has a new and modern tourist shopping mall. The center has a central plaza with saltwater pools and 'swim-up' style bars. There are several jewelry stores and many small shops selling ubiquitous souvenir items. It is generally open only to cruise ship passengers.

Costa Maya is the closest port of access to many of the lesser-known Mayan ruins in the Yucatan including Chacchoben and Kohunlich. These sites are substantially less excavated than the better-known pyramids of Tulum and Coba to the north; Chichen Itza and Uxmal in Yucatan.

The port sustained heavy damage due to Hurricane Dean in August 2007. This included the dock designed for cruise ships. Holland America's Westerdam was the first cruise ship to return to the port since Hurricane Dean on October 31, 2008.

== History ==
=== Pre-Colonial ===
Around 6500 BC the Native Americans started agricultural activities. The agriculture was of the slash and burn type. Around 3500 BC the agricultural skill had developed as such that they formed permanent villages in the center of Mexico. The Maya are not the first culture to appear in Mexico; they were preceded by the Olmecs near the Gulf coast. The first Maya like culture appeared around 200 BC in the south of Mexico (Chiapas).

The Maya were predominant in three areas: the northern area which is the Yucatán Peninsula, the central area which is the Petén area and the western area which are the lowlands bordering to Belize. The Costa Maya falls under the western lowlands. The agricultural skills evolved between 200 BC and 900 AD to the extent that workers could be made available to build the beautiful cities as we know them today. In the area around the Costa Maya the building styles called Rio Bec and Chennes are found. The Mayan culture weakened during the period of 900 AD to 1200 AD. Other cultures influenced the building styles in that period (an example of this is Tulum).

The Río Bec and Chennes sites are some of the most recent found in Mexico. Most of the sites were found by rubber farmers scouting the forest in search of rubber trees. The discovered sites are as follows:

Río Bec	Chennes
Río Bec	Chacchoben
Calakmul	Chicanná
Río Azul (Guatemala)	Becán
Naachtúm (Guatemala)	Xpuhil
Uaxactún (Guatemala)	Dzibanche
Tikal (Guatemala)	Kohunlich
Nakum (Guatemala)
Mutul (Guatemala)
Tayasal (Guatemala)
Naranjo (Belize)

During the Mayan high times there was a flourishing maritime trade along the Yucatan coast. The Mayans used large dugout canoes. They traded in fabrics, jade, obsidian, salt, and shells. The area of Xcalak was a landing point because of the two openings in the reef. Xcalak means 'the twins' in Yucatec Maya. A small unnamed site was found just east of the current village of Xcalak.

=== Colonial ===
==== Yucatan ====
The first contact between the Spanish conquerors and the Maya took place in 1502 in Honduras. Initial contacts were friendly; however when Francisco Hernández de Córdoba arrived on the Yucatán Peninsula in 1517 intent on conquest, the Maya resisted. Thousands of Spaniards were killed within a short period of time, giving subsequent conquistadores adequate excuse for subjugating the native population.

Hernán Cortés landed in 1519 on Cozumel and within three years he had conquered most of the area. Twenty years later the Mayans suffered their final defeat by Francisco de Montejo.

Following Mexican independence in 1821, the Mayan territories of Chiapas and Yucatan decided to join the United States of Mexico in 1840.

==== Costa Maya ====
The history of Xcalak dates back to pre-Hispanic times, with 16 archaeological sites having been discovered between Punta Herrero (south of Bahia Espiritu Santo) and Boca Bacalar Chico. Seven of these sites are located between Punta Gavilan (just north of Guacamaya) and Boca Bacalar Chico, the border with Belize.

In the 16th century, English pirates took over a large part of the coast and attacked Spanish ships that transported gold and riches back to Spain. Spain tried to defend its interests by constructing forts such as the one at Bacalar. Pirates continued to devastate the region, intending to take over the entire peninsula in the name of the English Crown. The reign of the pirates lasted until the end of the 19th century, taking advantage of the indigenous rebellions and the abandonment in which the region was found.

At the end of the 19th century, the Mexican Navy took control over what is today the state of Quintana Roo. In 1897, during the presidency of Porfirio Diaz, a treaty was signed which established the territorial limits between British Honduras (now Belize) and Mexico. This caused serious problems for Mexico because the territorial limit was at the center of Boca Bacalar Chico canal. This natural canal separates the Xcalak peninsula from Ambergris Key, and as a result, Mexican military vessels lost access to Chetumal Bay and remain at the mercy of Belize for permits.

Due to the lack of access to Chetumal Bay, Brigadier Angel Ortiz Monasterio, the Mexican consulate, commissioned engineer Rebolledo to find a suitable place to build a port in this area. Rebolledo selected Xcalak because two natural entrances through the barrier reef would permit navigation. The port was established in an effort to permanently occupy this area. From this site, Mexico intended to direct a military campaign to stop the supply of arms to the Maya rebels of Quintana Roo, who were participating in what is known as the Caste War. This led to the establishment of a base on the southern limits of Xcalak peninsula.

In October 1899, a site was constructed on the Zaragoza Canal to provide access to Chetumal Bay. (This canal south of town has recently been reopened and re-dredged in another effort to allow military vessels access to the bay.) At the same time, on the Caribbean coast the widening of the entrance through the reef was initiated. In addition, a 'Decauville' railroad was built between Xcalak and La Aguada (on Chetumal Bay) in order to relieve the boat traffic through the narrow international canal.

The development resulted in a port system which overcame the lack of a direct entrance into Chetumal Bay. Equipment was unloaded in Xcalak, taken by train to La Aguada, and then reloaded and taken to Payo Obispo, which was founded two years earlier. Thus, the village of Xcalak was founded on May 19, 1900, as the base for the 'Southern Fleet' and the first shipyard in the Mexican Caribbean. At the same time, the first telegraph in the state was built.

When the Federal Territory of Quintana Roo was created in 1902, there were three important villages on the coast: Xcalak in the south, Vigia Chico in the middle, and Puerto Morelos in the north. The Xcalak village was the only village in the territory that did not depend on mahogany and chicle (used for chewing gum). Xcalak relied upon fishing and the exportation of coconut. The organization of copra, or coconut ranches, began in Xcalak and expanded to the bay area. Copra exportation eventually replaced fishing.

== Recent ==
In the 1950s, Xcalak's economy was very healthy, boasting developments such as stone and wood construction, an ice factory, and electric plant, storehouses for large quantities of copra, grocery stores, a billiard hall, a movie theater, and an ice cream factory. Xcalak was the most important supply center in the region. After Hurricane Janet (1955), Xcalak was in ruins. Many of its inhabitants died, including the lighthouse keeper and many sailors. The survivors were traumatized and a large group migrated to interior towns. The survivors who remained in Xcalak returned to fishing. The area was repopulated with people from San Pedro and Sarteneja, Belize, as well as from Honduras and El Salvador.

The fishing trade resulted in social organizations. On October 25, 1959, the Cooperative Fishing Production Society of Andrea Quintana Roo was founded. It consisted of 49 members. Fishing techniques were greatly altered with the arrival of the first outboard motors made by Calipso and Lister.

In 1980, a 120 kilometers (75 mi) gravel road was built, forming the Chetumal – Carrillo Puerto highway. This established a land route between the village of Xcalak and the rest of the state. People often recall that the first vehicle to arrive in the village was a Land Rover.

At the end of the 1980s Costa de Cocos and the first dive shop, 'Aventuras Chinchorro' (now XTC Dive Center), opened. Soon after that a second dive shop 'Xcalak Dive Center' appeared. These developments increased tourism and marked the beginning of a new period.

On August 24, 1995, the government of Quintana Roo published the decree for the 'Ecological regulation for the area referred to as the Maya Coast' (Punta Herero - Xcalak). The decree outlined tourism development plans for the Costa Maya corridor. Xcalak was designated as one of the sites for the greatest development. The restoration of the municipal pier in Xcalak was completed at the end of 1995 to facilitate tourism development. In June 1996, a ferry pier was built at La Aguada in order to provide service between Chetumal and Xcalak. At the same time, the existing airstrip in Xcalak was enlarged.

There are approximately 300 native inhabitants of Xcalak. Most rely on fishing for their livelihood; however, many are now working in tourism and recently the Tourism Cooperative was formed. Officials that have their headquarters in Xcalak include: the Municipal Delegation, State Government representative of the Judicial Police, a port captain, immigration officer, and Navy base. As part of the social structure, other associations have been formed: the Parents Association, the Electricity Committee, the fishing Cooperative, and a Community Committee in which different representatives of all community sectors participate. It is through the Community Committee that issues regarding the management and conservation of natural resources are addressed.

The resort was hit directly by Category 5 Hurricane Dean in August 2007. The area was also hit significantly by Hurricane Ernesto in early August 2012. Although much of the resort was not hit heavily, the surrounding town of Mahahual has experienced a large amount of damage.

== Planned takeover by Royal Caribbean ==
In October 2024, the cruise line Royal Caribbean announced that it had an agreement to acquire the port of Costa Maya and approximately 90 hectares (220 acres) of surrounding land and plans to convert it to a private resort named Perfect Day Mexico for the sole use of Royal Caribbean customers. It is scheduled to open in 2027 and will be a western Caribbean companion to Perfect Day at CocoCay, the Royal Caribbean-owned private island in the Bahamas. While only Royal Caribbean would have access to the resort, other cruise lines would have been able to dock at Costa Maya's port and get land transportation to shore excursions elsewhere. The Mexican government rejected the project in May 2026.
