= Xpujil =

Town in the Mexican state of Campeche

- Location within Campeche Location within Mexico
- Coordinates: 18°30′20″N 89°23′50″W
- Country: Mexico
- State: Campeche
- Municipality: Calakmul
- Elevation: 260 m (850 ft)

Population (2010)
  - City: 3,984
  - Urban: 3,984
- Time zone: UTC-6 (CST)
- Postal code: 24640
- Area code: 983
- Demonym: Xpujilense

Xpujil (Mayan pronunciation: [ʃpuˈxil]) is a town in the Mexican state of Campeche. It serves as the municipal seat for the surrounding municipality of Calakmul. As of 2010, Xpujil had a population of 3,984.

Xpujil is located in the south-east of the state, close to the border with Quintana Roo to the east and Peten, Guatemala, to the south. With Escárcega, Campeche 153 kilometres (95 mi) to the west and Chetumal, Quintana Roo 120 kilometres (75 mi) to the east it is a useful midway point on Federal Highway 186. Close to the town are the Maya ruins of Xpuhil (1 kilometre (0.62 mi)) and Becan (8 kilometres (5.0 mi)), Chicanná, Balamcan, Hormiguero. Further to the south-west is the major Maya site of Calakmul, in the 7,230 square kilometres (2,790 sq mi) Calakmul Biosphere Reserve.

Highway 186 was, as of February 2009, undergoing a major refurbishment to a multilane highway that will improve access to the zone.

In addition to providing services for the local community, Xpujil has a paved runway and serves as the gateway for tourists visiting those areas, with restaurants, transportation services, modest hotels, etc. Currently many tourists travel by road from Cancun to Palenque, and stop to visit the many Mayan sites in the region.

There are plans to increase room availability and other services for eco-tourism and other activities within the Calakmul Ecological reserve.

XEPUJ, a government-run indigenous community radio station that broadcasts in Spanish, Yucatec Maya and Ch'ol, is based in Xpujil.

== Valeriana ==
In October 2024 it was announced that a huge city, including pyramids, sports fields, causeways connecting districts and amphitheatres, had been discovered underground near Xpujil, using lidar. The discoverer named it "Valeriana", after a nearby lake, "Laguna La Valeriana", the dry bed of which had been used by drug smugglers as an airstrip.

== Transportation ==
Xpujil

General information
- Location: Xpujil; Mexico
- Coordinates: 18.526515°N 89.396201°W

History
- Opened: December 15, 2024

Services
| Preceding station | Tren Maya | Following station |
|---|---|---|
| Calakmul toward Palenque | Tren Maya | Nicolás Bravo-Konhunlich toward Cancún Airport |
Location

Xpujil is served by a station of the Tren Maya, which opened on December 15, 2024
