= Calakmul Municipality =

Municipality in Campeche, Mexico

Calakmul
- Municipality
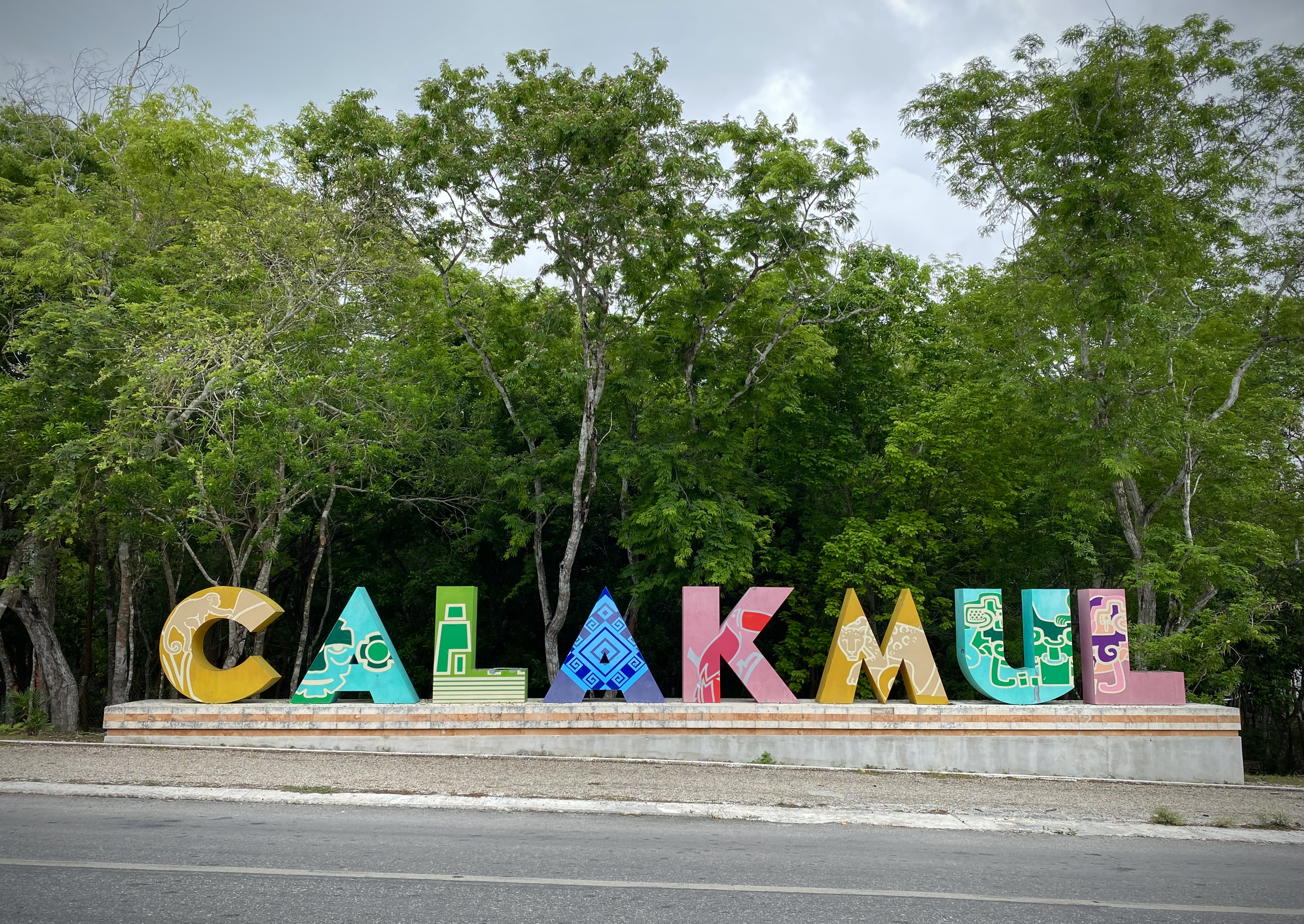
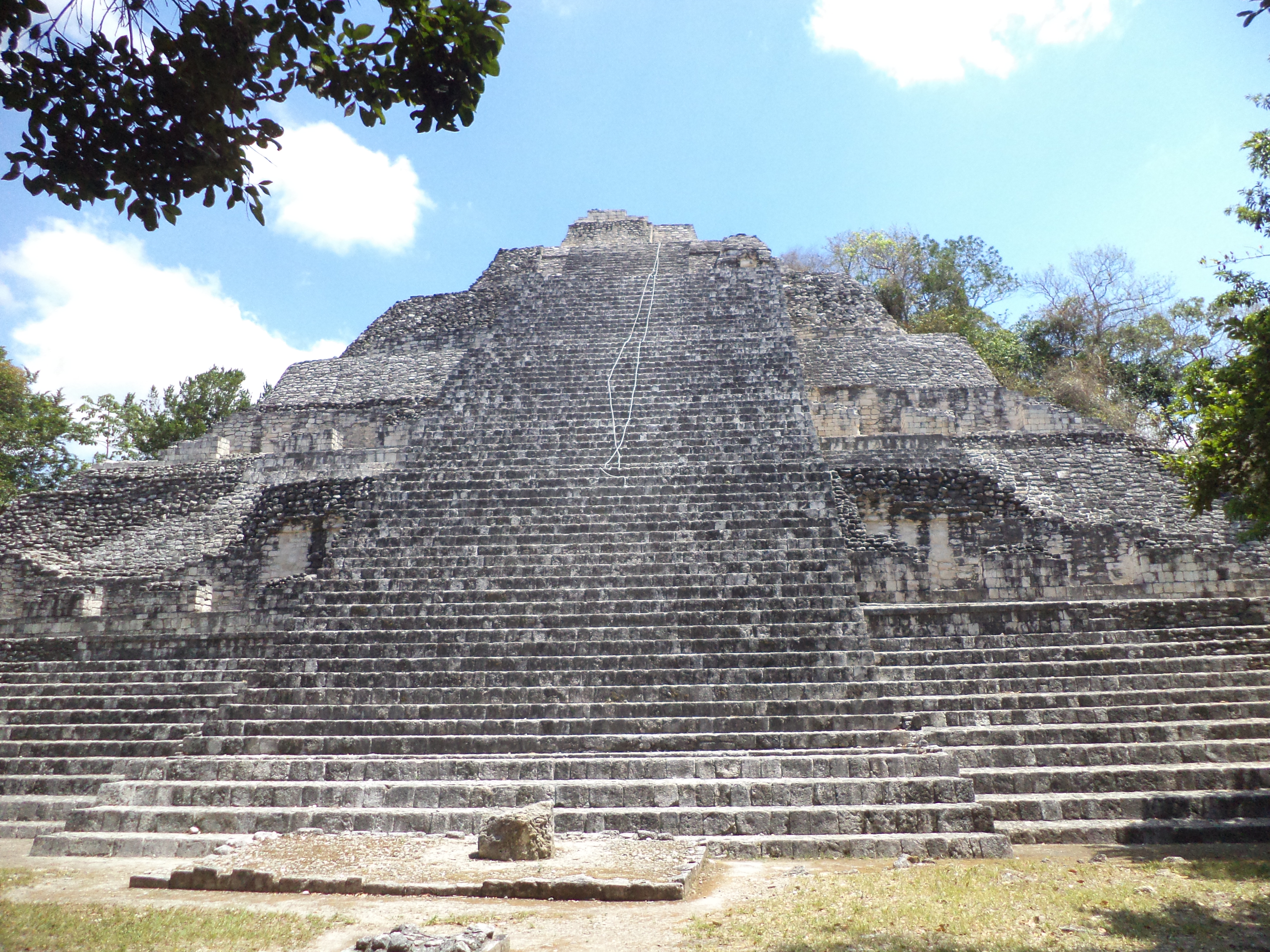
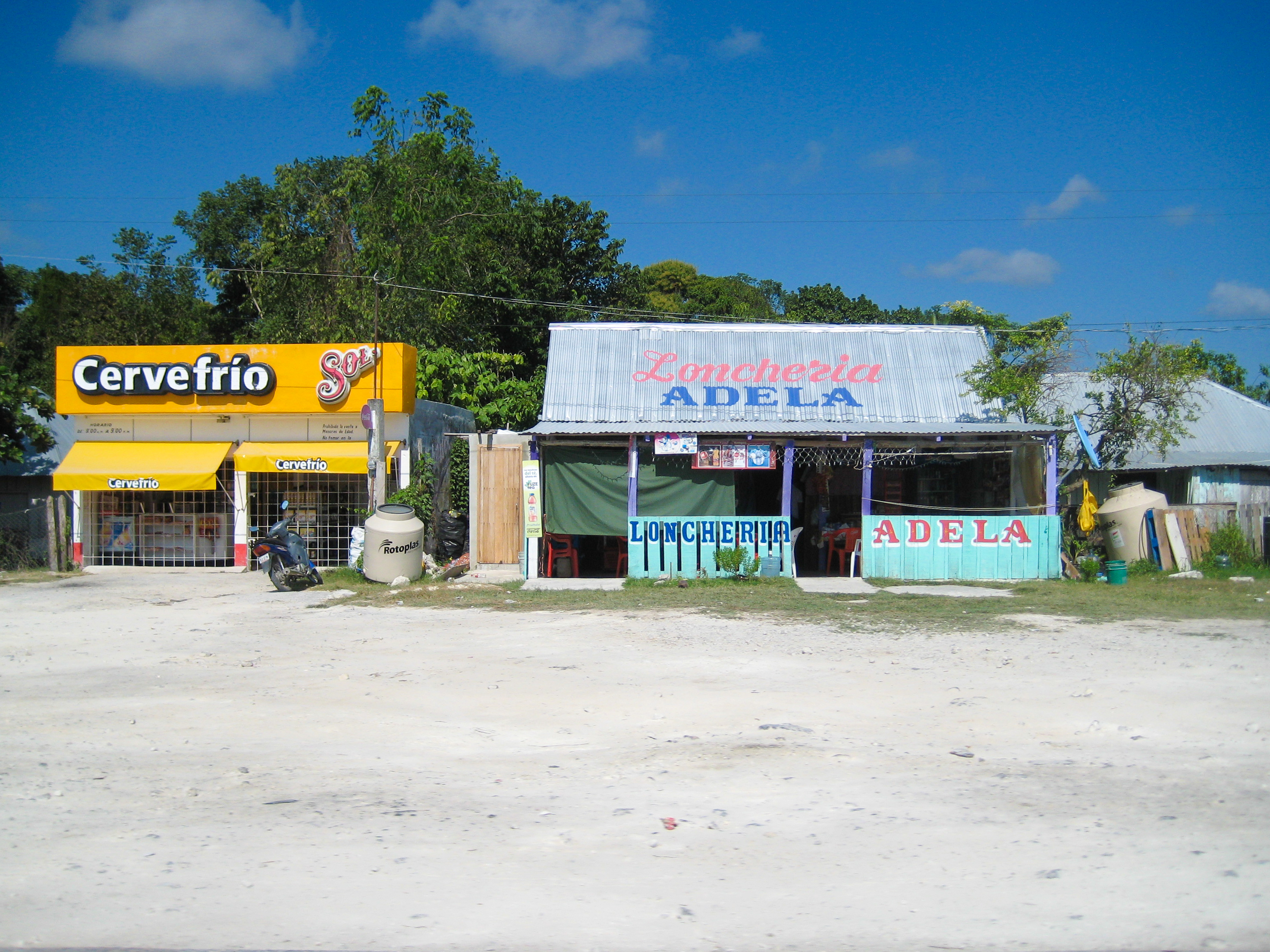
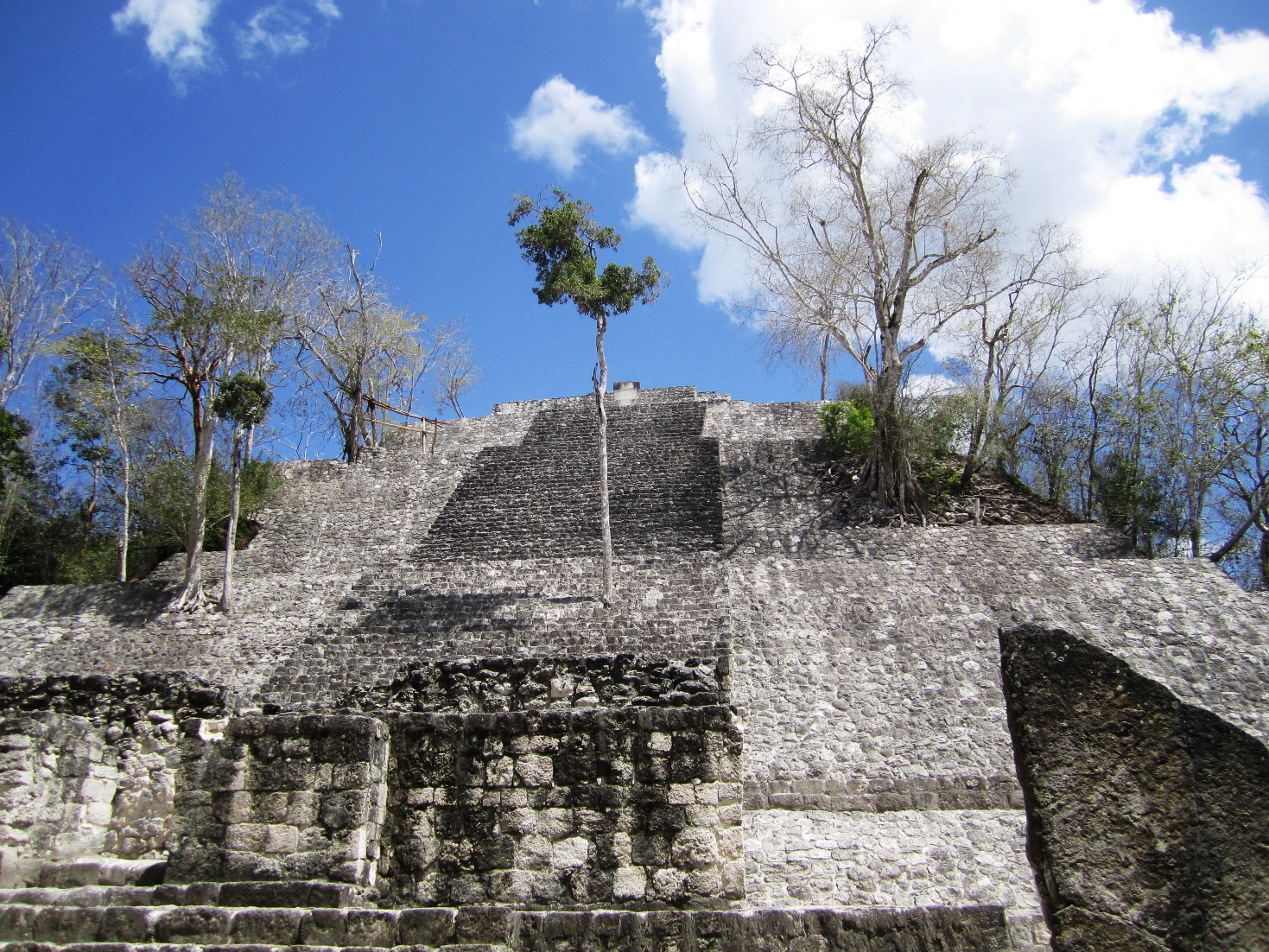
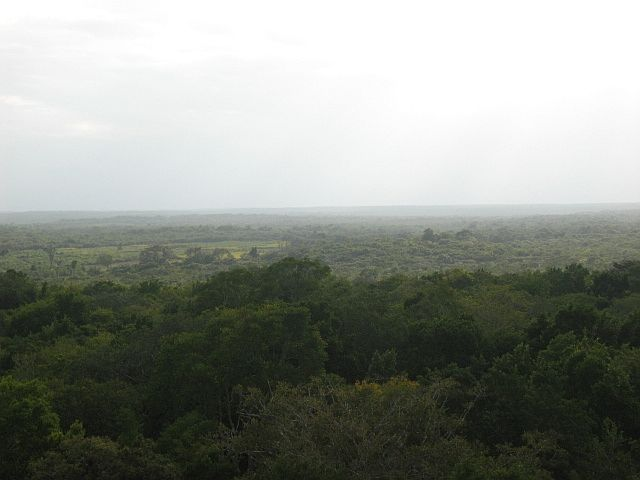
- Top: Calakmul letters; Middle: Becan Archaeological Zone, Xpujil town; Bottom: Calakmul Archaeological Zone, Calakmul Biosphere Reserve

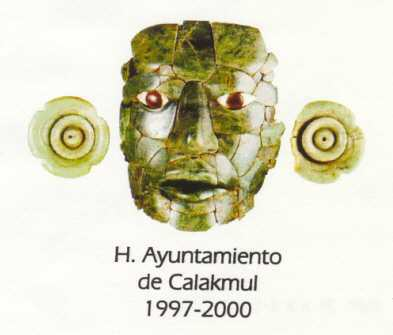
- Coat of arms

- Location of Calakmul in Campeche.
- Country: Mexico
- State: Campeche
- Municipal seat and largest seat: Xpujil
- Established: December 31, 1996

Government
  - Mayor: Guadalupe Acevedo Rodríguez (MORENA)

Area
  - Total: 13,987 km^{2} (5,400 sq mi)

Population (2020)
  - Total: 31,764
  - Density: 2.2710/km^{2} (5.8818/sq mi)
  - Seat: 5,729
- Time zone: UTC−6 (CST)

Calakmul is a municipality in the Mexican state of Campeche, situated in the central part of the Yucatán Peninsula.

== History ==
The municipality was created on 31 December 1996, from part of the territory of Champotón. On 19 June 1998, the State Congress enacted legislation creating the new municipality of Candelaria as of 1 July of that year, and Calakmul lost 24% of its population and a portion of its territory.

== Geography ==
The municipality of Calakmul borders to the east with Quintana Roo (municipalities of José María Morelos, Bacalar, and Othón P. Blanco) and Belize (Orange Walk District); to the south with Guatemala (Petén Department); and to the north and west with other municipalities in Campeche (Candelaria, Champotón, Escárcega and Hopelchén). It covers 13,839.11 km^{2} (5,343.31 sq mi), accounting for 24.34% of the state's total surface area, and is the 10th-largest municipality in area in the country.

== Demographics ==
The 2020 census reported a population of 31,714. The languages spoken in Calakmul include Yucatec Maya, Ch'ol, Chontal, Tzotzil, and others. The municipal seat is the town of Xpujil, a small settlement of 5,729 inhabitants located on Federal Highway 186 as it crosses the base of the peninsula from Escárcega, Campeche, to Chetumal, Quintana Roo. Apart from Xpujil other localities includes Constitución (1,386 hab.), Zoh-Laguna (1,144 hab.), Pablo García (832 hab.), Nuevo Conhúas (757 hab.) and Ingeniero Ricardo Payro Jene (695 hab.).

== Heritage ==
Maya archaeological sites in the municipality include: Calakmul, Becán, Chicanna, El Hormiguero, Río Bec and Xpuhil. The Calakmul Biosphere Reserve also covers much of its southern portion.
