= Joyce Marcus =

American archaeologist

- Occupation: Archaeologist
- Spouse: Kent Flannery

Academic background
- Education: Beverly Hills High School
- Alma mater: UC Berkeley Harvard University
- Doctoral advisor: Gordon Willey
- Other advisor: Tatiana Proskouriakoff

Academic work
- Discipline: Archaeologist and anthropologist
- Institutions: University of Michigan

Joyce Marcus is an archaeologist and professor in the Department of Anthropology, College of Literature, Science, and the Arts at the University of Michigan, Ann Arbor. She also holds the position of Curator of Latin American Archaeology, University of Michigan Museum of Anthropological Archaeology. Marcus has published extensively in the field of Latin American archaeological research. Her focus has been primarily on the Zapotec, Maya, and coastal Andean civilizations of Central and South America. Much of her fieldwork has been concentrated in the Valley of Oaxaca, Mexico. She is known for her "Dynamic model", four-tiered hierarchy, and her use of interdisciplinary study.

== Biography ==
Joyce Marcus was born in California and attended Beverly Hills High School. She credits receiving a copy of An Introduction to the Study of the Maya Hieroglyphs by S.G. Morley from Dr. Robert F. Heizer in 1969 after a field season in Lovelock, Nevada with influencing her to get into the field of hieroglyphics.

She received her B.A. from the University of California, Berkeley in 1969, and went on to receive her M.A. in 1971 and her Ph.D. in 1974, both from Harvard University. She did her dissertation under her mentor, Tatiana Proskouriakoff, and Gordon R. Willey, Jeremy A. Sabloff, and Evon Z. Vogt. Her book, Emblem and State in the Classic Maya Lowlands: An Epigraphic Approach to Territorial Organization, is the published version of her dissertation.

Marcus has spent her entire teaching career at the University of Michigan, from 1973 to the present, though she has been invited to guest lecture all over the world. She became a curator for Latin American Archaeology for the University of Michigan Museum of Anthropology in 1978. She has also consulted for the American Museum of Natural History in New York, the University Museum at the University of Pennsylvania, the Cotson Institute of Archaeology at the University of California, Los Angeles, and the Peabody Museum at Harvard University.

In 1997, Marcus was elected to the National Academy of Sciences, and in 2005, she became the first archaeologist elected to the council. In 2005, the University of Michigan awarded her the Robert L. Carneiro Distinguished University Professor of Social Evolution. Marcus is also a fellow of the American Academy of Arts and Sciences, American Philosophical Society, and Institute of Andean Studies. She is a member of the American Anthropological Association, the Society for American Archaeology, the American Society for Ethnohistory, the Midwest Andeanist Society, and the Midwest Mesoamerican Society.

She has received funding from the National Endowment for the Humanities, the Ford Foundation, the Bowditch Fund at Harvard University, Dumbarton Oaks, the American Association for University Women, the National Science Foundation, and the University of Michigan.

William J. Folan invited her to record the Maya monuments at Calakmul, Campeche and surrounding areas in 1983-1984. She has done research at Dumbarton Oaks Center for Pre-Columbian Studies in Washington, DC. Marcus often works and publishes with her husband Kent V. Flannery. Marcus and Flannery directed the Valley of Oaxaca Human Ecology Project with the University of Michigan, a long-term project designed by Flannery.

== Awards ==
- 1979 The Henry Russel Award for Scholarly research from the University of Michigan
- 1992 Honorable mention for outstanding book in the social sciences and humanities by the Latin American Studies Association for her book Mesoamerican Writing Systems: Propaganda, Myth, and history in four Ancient Civilizations
- 1995 Literature, Science, and Arts Excellence in Research Award from the University of Michigan
- 1998-2005 Elman R Service Professor of Cultural evolution from the University of Michigan
- 2005 Robert L. Carneiro Distinguished University Professor of Social Evolution from the University of Michigan
- 2001 The Premio Caniem en el Arte Editorial award in Mexico for "La Civilización Zapoteca: Como Evolucionó La Sociedad Urbana en el Valle de Oaxaca" written with Kent Flannery
- 2003 Special recognition, Universidad Autónoma de Campeche
- 2007 Distinguished Faculty Achievement Award, the University of Michigan, Mentor Recognition Award, the University of California, San Diego
- 2008 The Cotson Book prize in archaeology for Excavations at Cerro Azul, Peru: The Architecture and Pottery
- 2014 Corresponding fellow of the Academia Mexicana de la Historia.

== Publications ==
=== Books and monographs ===
- Marcus, Joyce (1976) Emblem and State in the Classic Maya Lowlands: An Epigraphic Approach to Territorial Organization. Dumbarton Oaks, Washington, D.C.
- Flannery, Kent V. and Joyce Marcus (editors) (1983) The Cloud People: Divergent Evolution of the Zapotec and Mixtec Civilizations. School of American Research Series, Academic Press, NY. (This book resulted from a seminar, “The Cloud People: Evolution of the Zapotec and Mixtec Civilizations of Oaxaca, Mexico”, October 6–10, 1975 at the School of American Research in Santa Fe, New Mexico.)
- Marcus, Joyce (1987) Late Intermediate Occupation at Cerro Azul, Perú. A Preliminary Report. Tech. Report 20, Museum of Anthropology, University of Michigan.
- Marcus, Joyce (1987) The Inscriptions of Calakmul: Royal Marriage at a Maya City in Campeche, Mexico. Tech. Report 21, Museum of Anthropology, University of Michigan.
- Flannery, Kent V., Joyce Marcus, and Robert G. Reynolds (1989) The Flocks of the Wamani: A Study of Llama Herders on the Punas of Ayacucho, Peru. Academic Press, New York.
- Marcus, Joyce (editor) (1990) Debating Oaxaca Archaeology. Anthropological Paper, No. 84. Ann Arbor, Michigan: Museum of Anthropology, University of Michigan. (Resulted from a symposium at the 1987 Northeast Mesoamericanist Society meeting in Philadelphia, which was organized as a response to criticism by William Sanders.)
- Marcus, Joyce (1992) Mesoamerican Writing Systems: Propaganda, Myth, and History in Four Ancient Civilizations. Princeton University Press, Princeton, New Jersey.
- Flannery, Kent V. and Joyce Marcus (1994) Early Formative Pottery of the Valley of Oaxaca, Mexico. Prehistory and Human Ecology of the Valley of Oaxaca, No. 10. Memoir 27, Museum of Anthropology, University of Michigan, Ann Arbor.
- Marcus, Joyce and Judith F. Zeitlin (editors) (1994) Caciques and Their People: A Volume in Honor of Ronald Spores. Anthropological Paper, No. 89, Museum of Anthropology, University of Michigan, Ann Arbor.
- Marcus, Joyce and Kent V. Flannery (1996) Zapotec Civilization: How Urban Society Evolved in Mexico's Oaxaca Valley. Thames & Hudson, London.
- Feinman, Gary M. and Joyce Marcus (editors) (1998) Archaic States. School of American Research, SAR Press, Santa Fe, New Mexico.
- Marcus, Joyce (1998) Women's Ritual in Formative Oaxaca: Figurine-making, Divination, Death and the Ancestors. Memoir 33 of the Museum of Anthropology, University of Michigan, Ann Arbor.
- Marcus, Joyce and Kent V. Flannery (2001) La Civilización Zapoteca: Como Evolucionó La Sociedad Urbana en el Valle de Oaxaca. México: Fondo de Cultura Económica.
- Flannery, Kent V. and Joyce Marcus (2005) Excavations at San José Mogote 1: The Household Archaeology. Memoir 40 of the Museum of Anthropology, University of Michigan, Ann Arbor.
- Marcus, Joyce and Charles Stanish (2006) Agricultural Strategies. Cotsen Institute of Archaeology, Cotsen Advanced Seminar No. 2, UCLA.
- Marcus, Joyce (2008) Excavations at Cerro Azul, Peru: The Architecture and Pottery. UCLA Cotsen Institute of Archaeology.
- Marcus, Joyce and Jeremy A. Sabloff (editors) (2008) The Ancient City: New Perspectives on Urbanism in the Old and New Worlds. Santa Fe: School for Advanced Research Press. (This book resulted from the Sackler Colloquium of the National Academy of Sciences, “Early Perspectives on Pre-industrial Urbanism”, May 18–20, 2005 at the National Academy of Sciences in Washington DC.)
- Marcus, Joyce (2008) Monte Albán. El Colegio de México, Fideicomiso Historia de las Américas, Fondo de Cultura Económica.
- Marcus, Joyce and Patrick Ryan Williams (editors) (2009) Andean Civilization: A Tribute to Michael E. Moseley. Cotsen Institute of Archaeology, UCLA.
- Flannery, Kent V. and Joyce Marcus (2012) The Creation of Inequality: How Our Prehistoric Ancestors Set the Stage for Monarchy, Slavery, and Empire. Harvard University Press, Cambridge, MA.
