= Tatiana Proskouriakoff =

Russian-American Mayanist (1909–1985)

- Татьяна Проскурякова
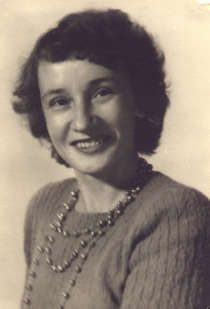
- Born: Tatyana Avenirovna Proskuryakova; January 23, 1909; Tomsk, Russian Empire
- Died: August 30, 1985 (aged 76); Cambridge, Massachusetts, United States
- Citizenship: United States (from 1924)
- Education: Pennsylvania State University
- Known for: Seminal contributions to Mayanist archeology
- Scientific career
- Fields: Mayanist archeology and linguistics
- Workplaces: Peabody Museum of Archaeology and Ethnology; Carnegie Institution of Washington; University of Pennsylvania Museum

Tatiana Avenirovna Proskouriakoff (Russian: Татьяна Авенировна Проскурякова, Tatyana Avenirovna Proskuryakova; 23 January [O.S. 10 January] 1909, – August 30, 1985) was a Russian-American Mayanist scholar and archeologist who contributed significantly to the deciphering of Maya hieroglyphs, the writing system of the pre-Columbian Maya civilization of Mesoamerica.

Born in Tomsk, Tatiana moved to the US with her parents in 1916. In 1924, she accepted American citizenship. She graduated from the College of Architecture at Pennsylvania State University (1930). In 1936–1937, she took part in two seasons of an archeological expedition to Piedras Negras (Guatemala). In 1939, she made scientific trips to Copán and Chichen Itza. From 1940 to 1958, she was a staff member of the Carnegie Institute and developed methods of dating ancient Mayan monuments based on the peculiarities of the fine arts style. From 1950 to 1955, she worked at the excavations of Mayapan. In 1958, Proskouriakoff moved to the Peabody Museum at Harvard University, where she worked until her retirement in 1977. In her final years of life, she had Alzheimer's disease.

Proskouriakoff's most significant scientific contribution is considered to be the consistent application of the structural method to Mayan inscriptions of the classical period, as a result of which she proved that historical events were recorded on the monuments. Publications about new method application have been published since 1960. In 1967, she wrote the preface for the English translation of Yuri Knorozov's monograph "Writing of Maya Indians". However, she did not try to voice Maya texts, although she recognized the method of deciphering the written language.

Her work laid a solid foundation for understanding Mayan historical texts and reconstructing the political history of Mayan city-states. In 1974, she prepared a catalog of a thousand jade products from the sacred cenote Chichen Itza, kept in the Peabody Museum. Proskouriakoff worked for over twenty years on the consolidated history of the Maya, which was published posthumously in 1994. In 1998, part of Proskouriakoff's ashes was buried in the "J-23" building on the Acropolis in Piedras Negras, which she depicted in her archeological reconstructions.

== Early life ==
She was born in Tomsk, in the Tomsk Governorate of the Russian Empire, to a chemist and his physician wife. The family traveled to the United States in 1915, her father being asked by Tsar Nicholas II to oversee the production of munitions for World War I. The Russian Revolution forced the family to remain permanently. She was to visit Russia only once after that, to meet the Mayanist Yuri Knorozov.

She was devoted to a career in interpreting art, architecture, and hieroglyphics. She could read proficiently at age 3. She had a talent for drawing and received lessons in art and watercolor.

The family lived for a while in Ohio, then moved to the Philadelphia area, settling down in Lansdowne, Pennsylvania. Proskouriakoff graduated valedictorian of her class and was the editor of the school yearbook.

External videos
- Unearthed in the Archives - Tatiana Proskouriakoff, Penn Museum

In 1926, Tatiana enrolled at the Pennsylvania State College School of Architecture and graduated as the only female in her class in 1930. Initially educated as an architect, she later went on to work for Linton Satterthwaite and for the University of Pennsylvania Museum at the Maya site of Piedras Negras in 1936–37. The Piedras Negras site lies between Mexico and Guatemala in the Usumacinta region. Specializing in architecture, Tatiana's first assignment at Piedras Negras was to illustrate the architectural ruins of the site. These initial travels would be the start of her life's work, as she found a passion for studying the ancient Maya. Upon her return to Philadelphia, she made a reconstruction drawing of the Piedras Negras acropolis which caught the attention of Silvanus Morley. Morley realized the young architect's remarkable ability to visualize a ruined structure as it once stood and render it with artistic precision. This would later lead to Tatiana's collaboration with Morley.

== Career ==
Proskouriakoff's reconstructive drawing of Structure 1 at Xpuhil (1943)

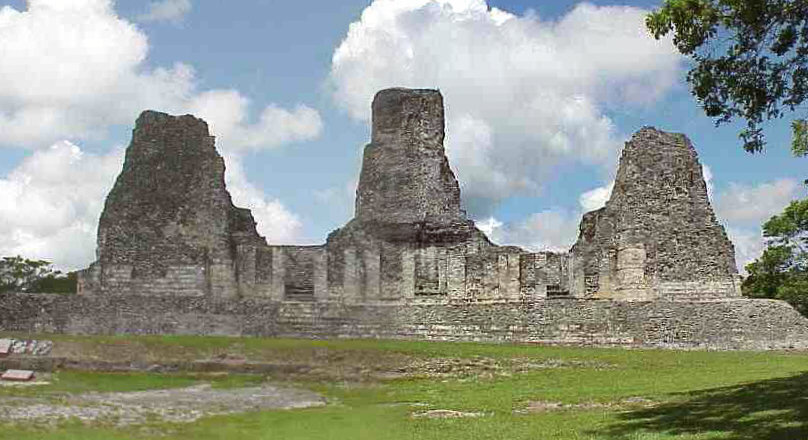
Xpujil as it appeared in 2000

While enrolled in graduate studies at the University of Pennsylvania, Proskouriakoff prepared archeological illustrations as a volunteer at the University Museum. Through her work with the museum's Assistant Curator of the American Section, Linton Satterthwaite, Proskouriakoff received an invitation in 1936 to join the museum's excavation work at the Maya site of Piedras Negras.

Although Proskouriakoff never received a degree in the field of Maya studies, her dedication and ability for it led to her receiving positions at the Carnegie Institution in Washington D.C., then later at Harvard University. Her position at Carnegie was procured when Sylvanus Morley saw the panoramic reconstruction on a visit to the museum; he was impressed and prevailed upon her to make more for the Carnegie Institution of Washington. Unable to get the institution to hire her, he raised funds to enable Proskouriakoff to travel to Copán and Yucatán, which she did in 1939. Returning after she completed the drawings, she was given the post of a research associate at the Institution in the early 1940s.

She soon became involved in Maya hieroglyphs and made significant contributions to the understanding of Mayan written language. For example, her 1942 scholarly analysis of the hieroglyphics at the Takalik Abaj ruins in Guatemala establish that the site was in part Maya, settling a debate at that time. Her greatest contribution was considered the breakthrough for Maya hieroglyphic decipherment in the late 1950s and early 1960s. While researching the chronology of changing styles of Maya sculpture, she discovered that the dates shown on the monumental stelae were actually historical, the birth, accession, and death dates for Maya rulers. Analyzing the pattern of dates and hieroglyphs, she was able to demonstrate a sequence of seven rulers who ruled over a span of two hundred years. Knowing the context of the inscriptions, Maya epigraphers were then able to decipher the hieroglyphs.

She became honorary curator, Maya art, of the Peabody Museum in 1958.

== Death ==
Tatiana Proskouriakoff died in Cambridge, Massachusetts, on August 30, 1985. She was 76 years old. On Easter Sunday 1998, after waiting more than a decade for political tensions to ease along the Usumacinta River, friend and colleague David Stuart carried Tatiana's ashes to Piedras Negras, where they were interred at the summit of the Acropolis, the group of structures in Tania's first and perhaps most famous reconstruction drawing, the same one that launched her career.

== Awards and recognition ==
- member of the American Anthropological Association
- Alfred V. Kidder Medal for eminence in American archaeology, 1962
- Woman of the Year by Pennsylvania State University, 1971
- Order of the Quetzal, Guatemala's highest honor, 1980 in 1984?
- Honorary Doctorate of Laws from Tulane University, 1977
- Elected to membership in the American Philosophical Society, 1981

== Published works ==
Proskouriakoff's publications include:

- "An Inscription on a Jade Probably Carved at Piedras Negras". Notes on Middle American Archaeology and Ethnology. 2 (47). Washington, D.C.: Carnegie Institution of Washington. Dept. of Archaeology.: 142–147 1944. JSTOR j.ctt46ntv8.53.
- An Album of Maya Architecture. Washington, D.C.: Carnegie Institution of Washington. 1946. ISBN 978-0-8061-1351-7. LCCN 47003736. OCLC 4152931.
- Middle American Art, 1950
- A Study of Classic Maya Sculpture Carnegie Institution of Washington Publication No. 593, 1950
- Varieties of Classic Central Veracruz Sculpture American Anthropology and History LVIII, 1954
- "Historical Implications of a Pattern of Dates at Piedras Negras, Guatemala". American Antiquity. 25 (4). Washington, D.C.: The Society for American Archaeology: 454–475. April 1960. doi:10.2307/276633.
- Portraits of Women in Maya Art, 1961
- Lords of the Maya Realm Expedition Magazine IV(1) 1961
- Mayapán, Yucatán, Mexico (with H E D Pollock, A L Smith and R L Roys) Carnegie Institution of Washington Publication No. 619, 1962
- Historical Data in the Inscriptions of Yaxchilan, Part 1 Estudios de Cultura Maya III, 1963
- Historical Data in the Inscriptions of Yaxchilan, Part 2 Estudios de Cultura Maya IV, 1964
- Olmec and Maya Art: Problems of Their Stylistic Relation Dumbarton Oaks Conference on the Olmec, 1968
- Classic Art of Central Veracruz Handbook of Middle American Indians Vol XI, 1971
- Slater Spotnitz, Lisa (1974). Proskouriakoff, Tatiana; Sabloff, Jeremy A.; Willey, Gordon R. (eds.). The Maya : An Introduction. Peabody Museum. ISBN 0873659953.
- Jades from the Cenote of Sacrifice, Chichen Itza, Yucatan 1974. Cambridge, Massachusetts: Peabody Museum Press. Memoirs of the Peabody Museum of Archaeology and Ethnology v. 10, no. 1
- Graphic designs on Mesoamerican pottery
- Maya calendar round dates such as 9 Ahau 17 Mol
- Proskouriakoff, Tatiana (1993). Joyce, Rosemary A. (ed.). Maya History. Austin, Texas: University of Texas Press. ISBN 0292750854. LCCN 92009387. OCLC 25507929. "foreword by Gordon R. Willey; biographical sketch by Ian Graham; illustrations by Barbara Carpenter Page."

== Sources ==
- Coe, Michael D. (1987). The Maya. Ancient peoples and places series (4th revised ed.). London and New York: Thames & Hudson. ISBN 0-500-27455-X. OCLC 15895415.
- Coe, Michael D. (1992). Breaking the Maya Code. London: Thames & Hudson. ISBN 0-500-05061-9. OCLC 26605966.
- Coe, Michael D.; Mark van Stone (2005). Reading the Maya Glyphs (2nd ed.). London: Thames & Hudson. ISBN 978-0-500-28553-4. OCLC 60532227.
- Marcus, Joyce (1989). "Tatiana Proskouriakoff". In Ute Gacs; Aisha Khan; Jerrie McIntyre; Ruth Weinberg (eds.). Women Anthropologists: Selected Biographies (Reprint of Westport, CT: Greenwood Press original, 1988, Illini Books ed.). Urbana: University of Illinois Press. pp. 297–302. ISBN 0-252-06084-9. OCLC 19670310.
- Sharer, Robert J.; Loa P. Traxler (2006). The Ancient Maya (6th, fully revised ed.). Stanford, CA: Stanford University Press. ISBN 0-8047-4816-0. OCLC 28067148.
- Solomon, Char (2002). Tatiana Proskouriakoff: Interpreting the Ancient Maya. Norman: University of Oklahoma Press. ISBN 0-8061-3445-3. OCLC 48965183.
- Stuart, David (December 1987). "Ten Phonetic Syllables". Research Reports on Ancient Maya Writing, 14. Washington, D.C.: Center for Maya Research. Archived from the original (PDF online republication: October 2005) on October 30, 2020.
- Villela, Khristaan D. (2000). "Morley Hires Tatiana Proskouriakoff". The PARI Journal. I (2). San Francisco, CA: Pre-Columbian Art Research Institute. ISSN 1531-5398. OCLC 44780248. Archived from the original (PDF online reproduction) on June 2, 2008.
