= Hormiguero, Mexico =

Mayan city

Coordinates: 18.4033°N 89.4850°W

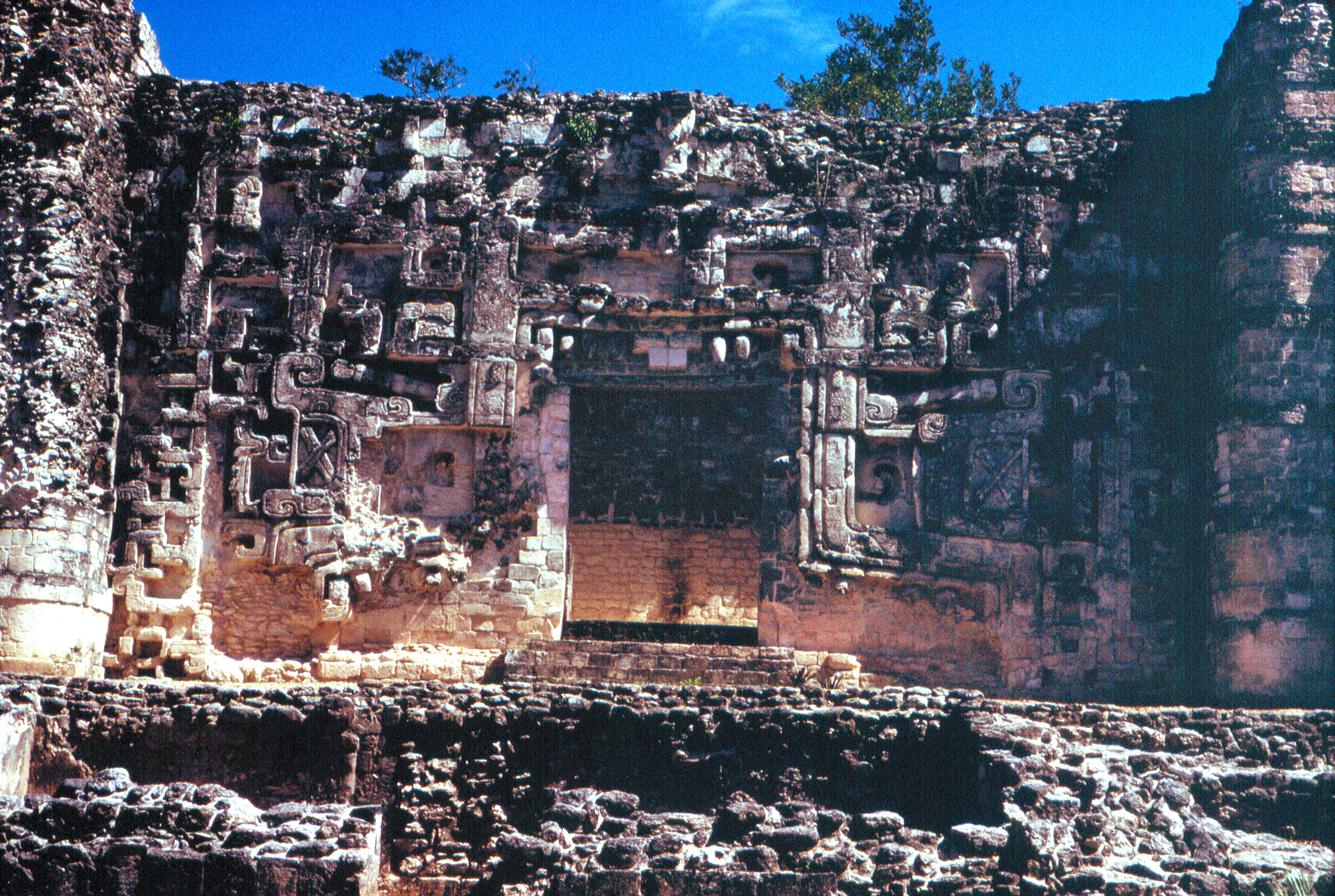
Monument at Hormiguerull Site

Hormiguero was a Mayan city which was at its peak in the Late Classic Period (650–850). It is located 22 kilometers south of Xpuhil in the Mexican state of Campeche. Only a few of its 84 known structures have been excavated. Structure II is the most completely excavated building at the site and one of the most wildly theatrical of all Rio Bec buildings. It is a rectangular platform, with two soaring, false-staircase towers either side of a colossal Chenes-style monster-portal. Inside there are several large chambers. Nearby is the Central Group, a complex of large temples, most of which are not excavated. Of those that are, Structure V is the most impressive. It is a towering pyramid with a well-preserved Chenes-style temple at the top.
