= Chacchoben =

Maya site in Quintana Roo, Mexico

- Maya Site
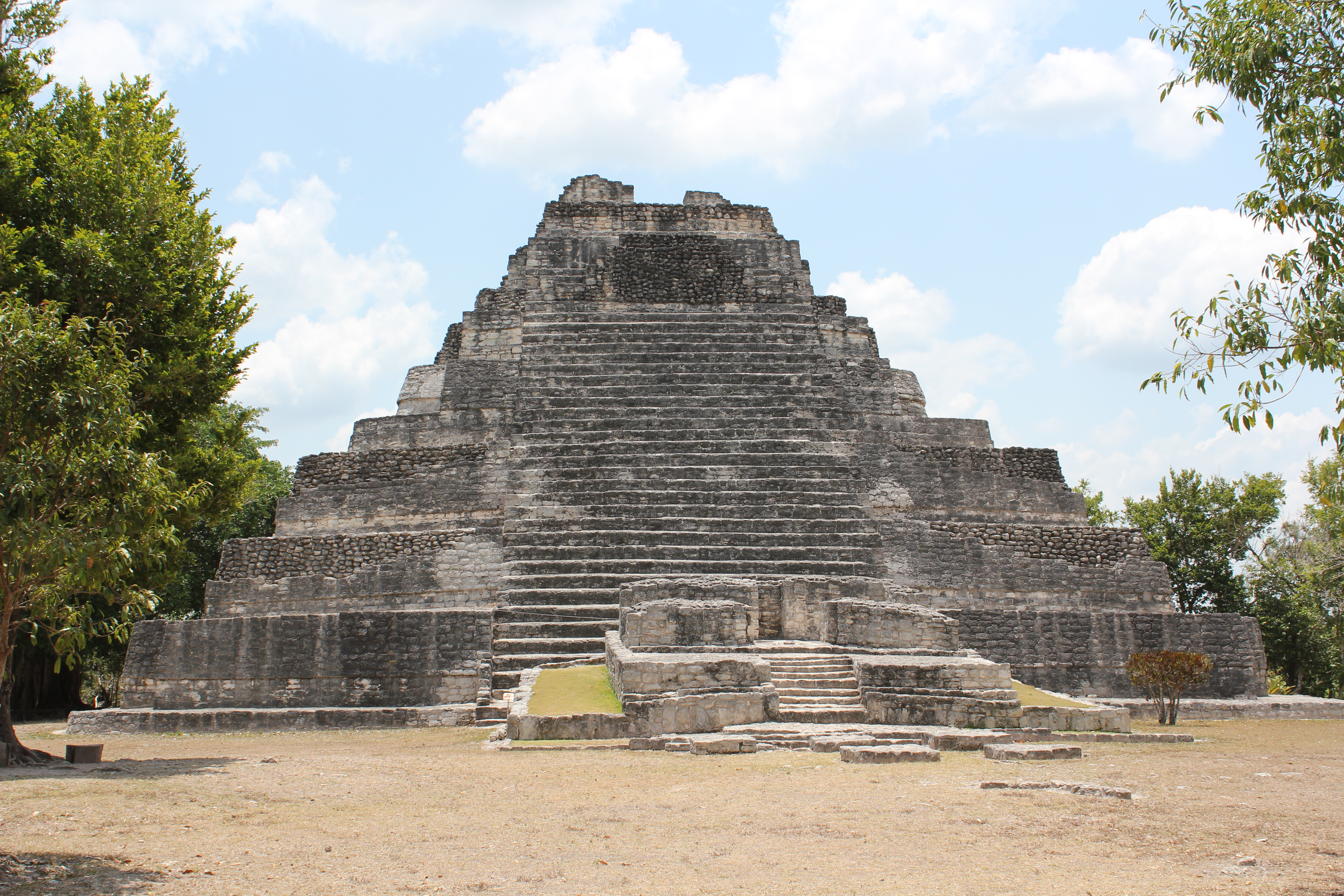

- Location on the Yucatán Peninsula in Mexico
- Coordinates: 19°00′02.94″N 88°13′56.57″W
- Country: Mexico
- State: Quintana Roo
- Constructed: 700
- Time zone: UTC-6 (CST)
  - Summer (DST): UTC-5 (Central Daylight Time)

Chacchoben (chak-cho-BEN; Maya for "the place of red corn") is a Maya ruin approximately 110 mi (177 km) south of Tulum and 7 mi (11 km) from the village from which it derives its name.

== History ==
Settlement by the Maya at the site is estimated at 200 BC, and the structures date from 700 AD. It is characterised by large temples and massive platform groups.

In the 1940s a farm was established near the site by the Cohuo family. The site was reported visited by archeologist Loring Hewen and briefly described in a letter to ethnohistorian Ralph Roys in 1962. The principal pyramid was apparently then still used as a site for religious worship. The ruins were officially reported to the Mexican government in June 1972 by Dr. Peter Harrison, an American archaeologist who was working on a project for The Royal Ontario Museum, and who also made the first maps of Chacchoben. Harrison stumbled upon this site while flying a helicopter over Mexico and noticed numerous hills in predominantly flat lands. Harrison realized there were temples beneath these hills, which were naturally covered over a period of 2000 years.

== Restoration ==
In 1994 the Mexican National Institute of Anthropology and History (INAH) began excavations and restored a significant part of the site, which was opened to the public in 2002. Other parts of the site are still overgrown and unrestored.

== Chacchoben today ==
Visitors to the site today can walk a circular path that includes three excavated and restored pyramids, as well as many walls and staircases. Excavation is continuing on several mounds which are known to contain further buildings. Some structures still bear traces of the red paint with which they were originally coated, and INAH has set up shaded areas to prevent further degradation of this pigment by the sun. Also notable at the base of the largest pyramid is a large stone slab called a stela with a Maya hieroglyphic inscription. Chacchoben is one of the more popular ruin sites in southern Quintana Roo, with regular tourist trips from the port of Costa Maya.

The surrounding jungle is characterized by abundant species of fauna, such as deer, peccary, armadillo, gray fox, spider monkey and howler monkey. Deeper into the jungle, more dangerous animals like jaguar, ocelot, puma and tapir can be found.

== Image gallery ==
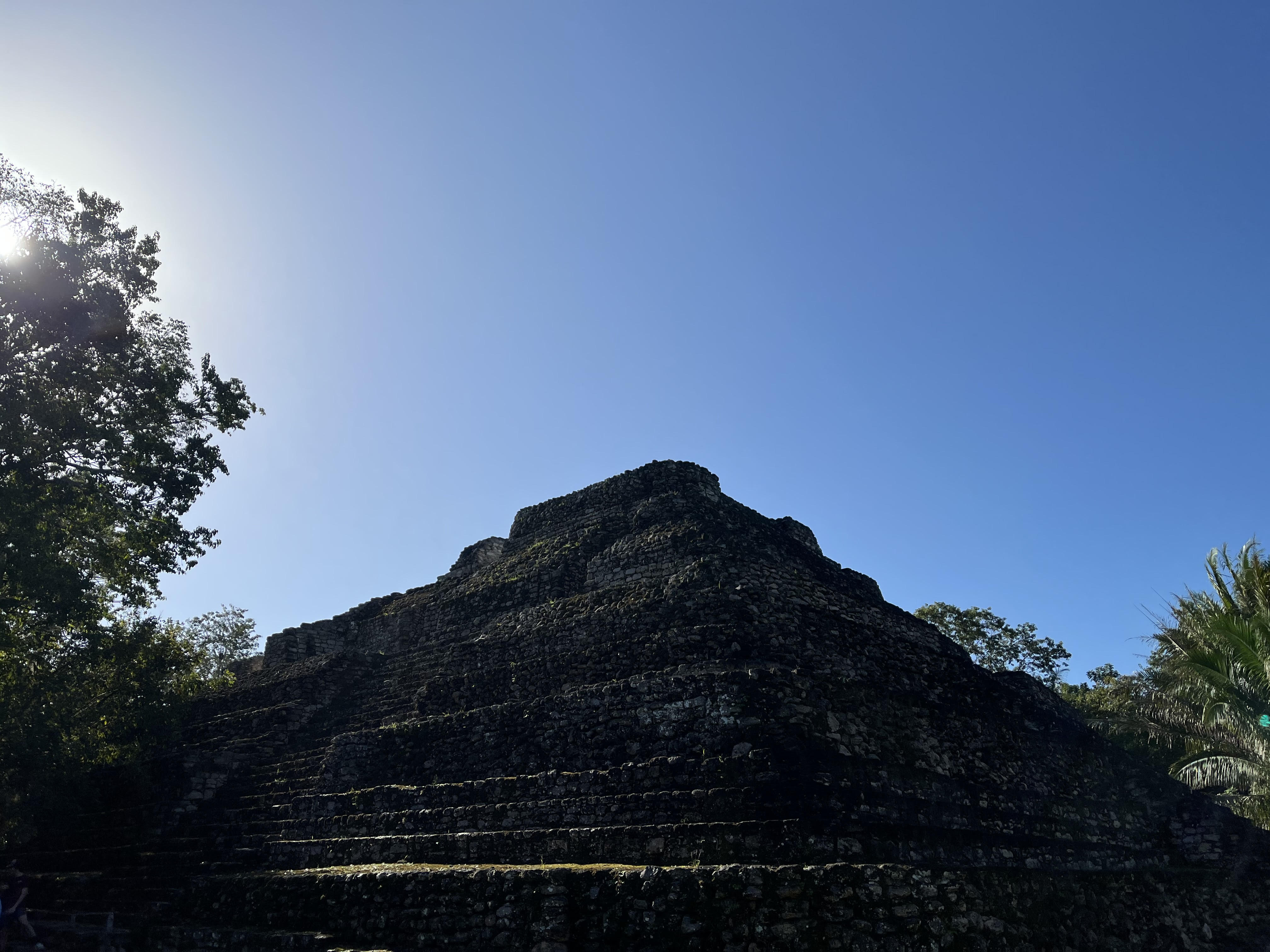
Temple in Chacchoben, February 2022

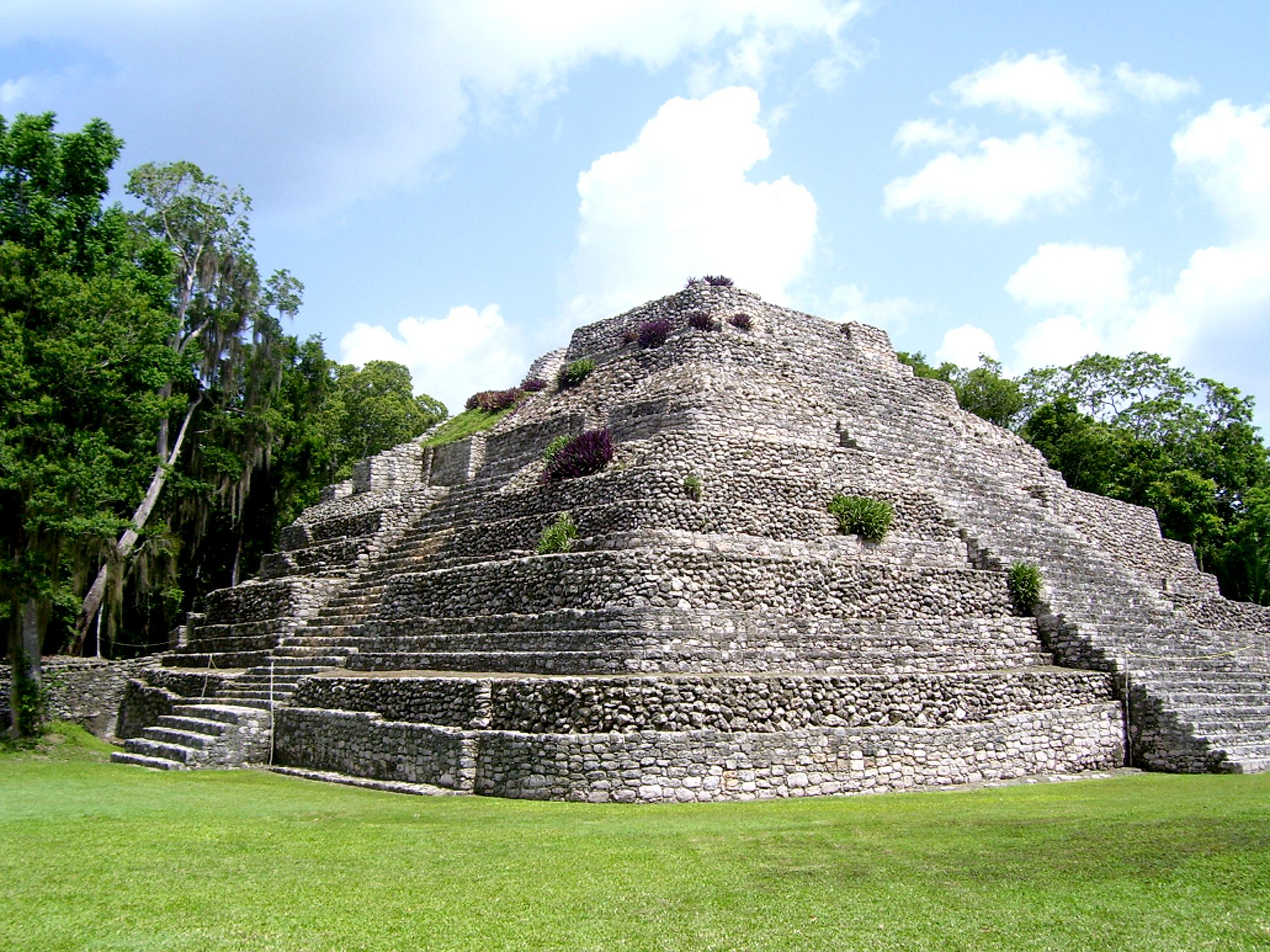
Temple pyramid at Chacchoben, August, 2007

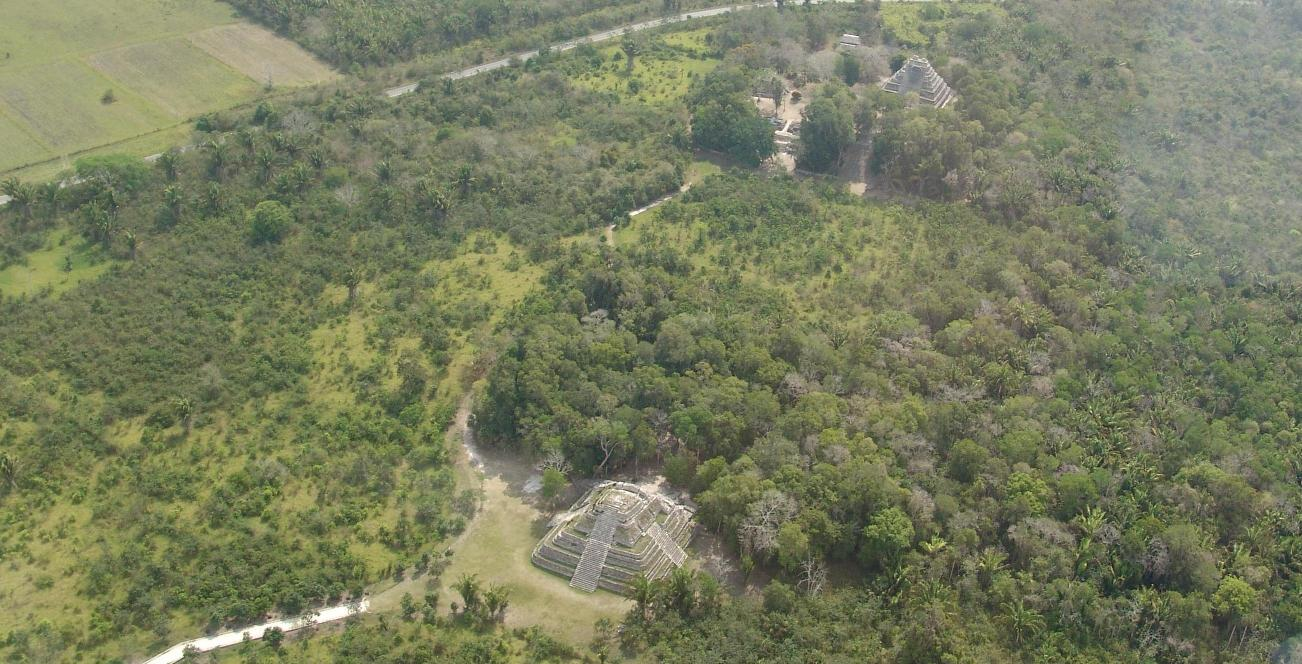
View of the ruins at Chacchoben from the air

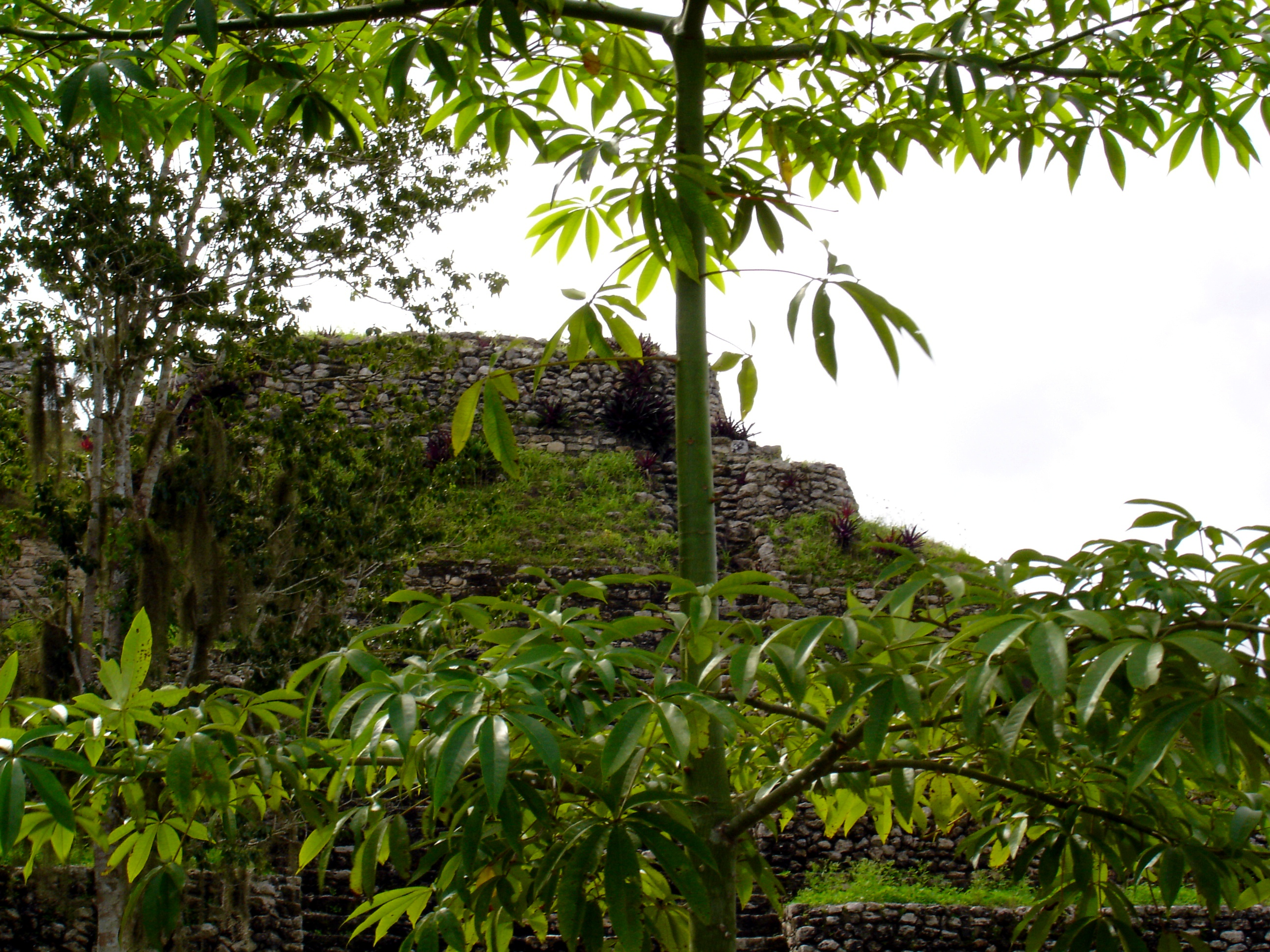
Temple pyramid at Chacchoben from tourist pathway

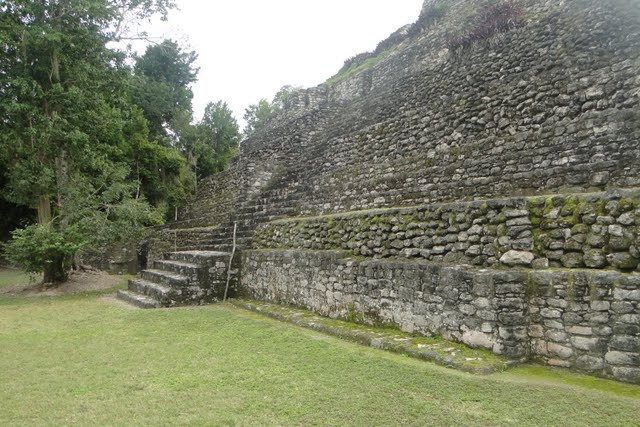
Chacchoben Maya ruins

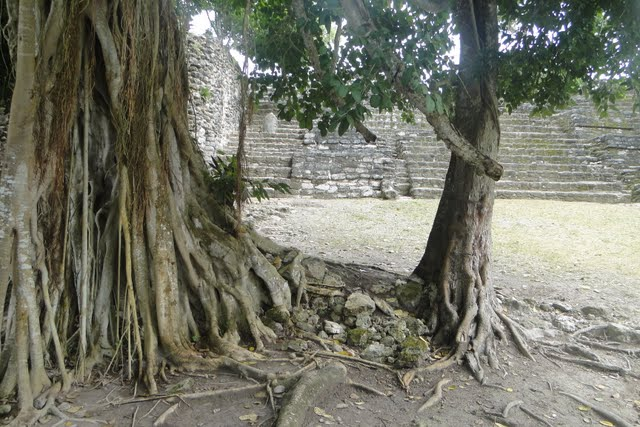
Ruins in jungles, Chacchoben

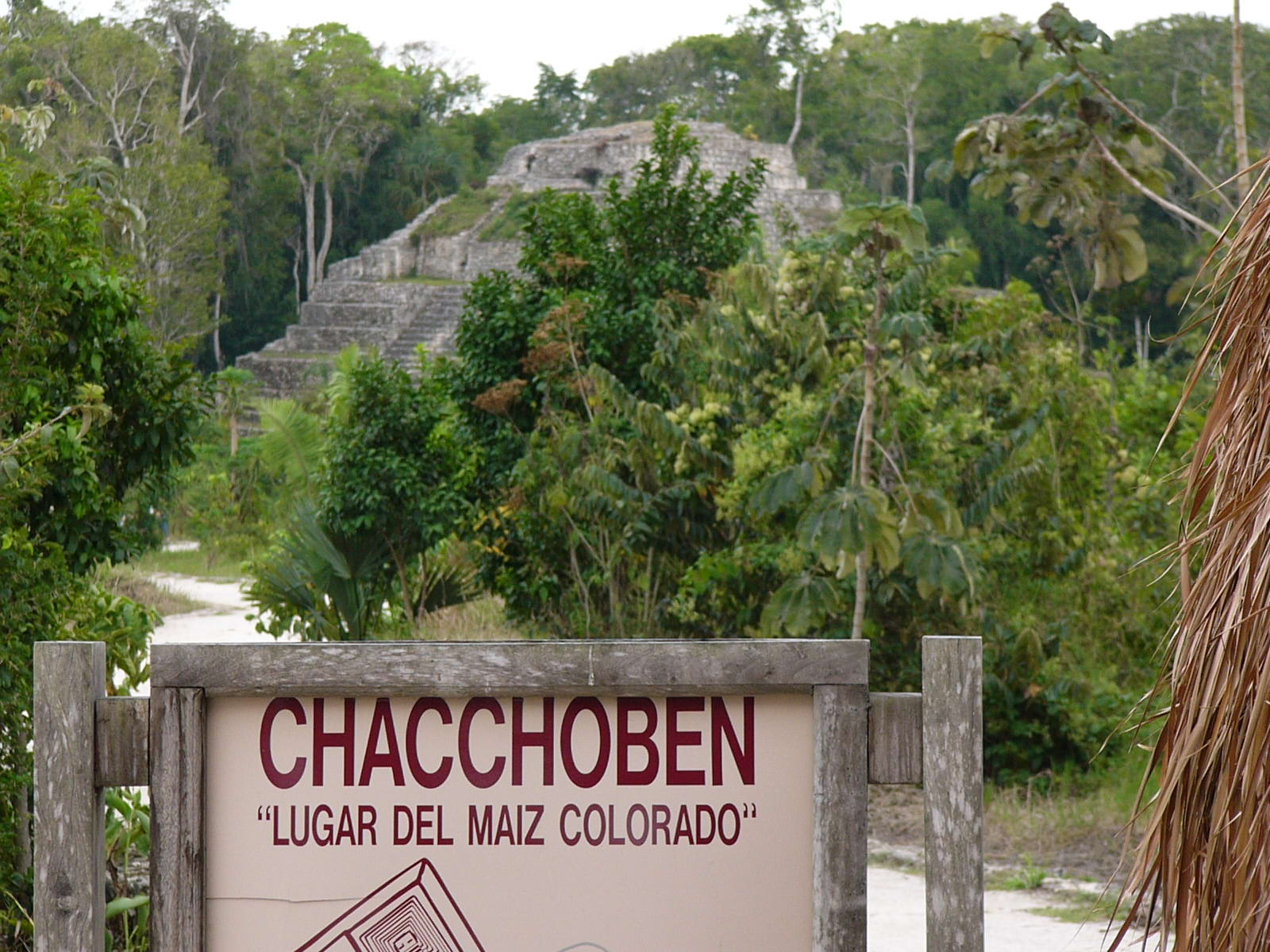
Sign and temple pyramid

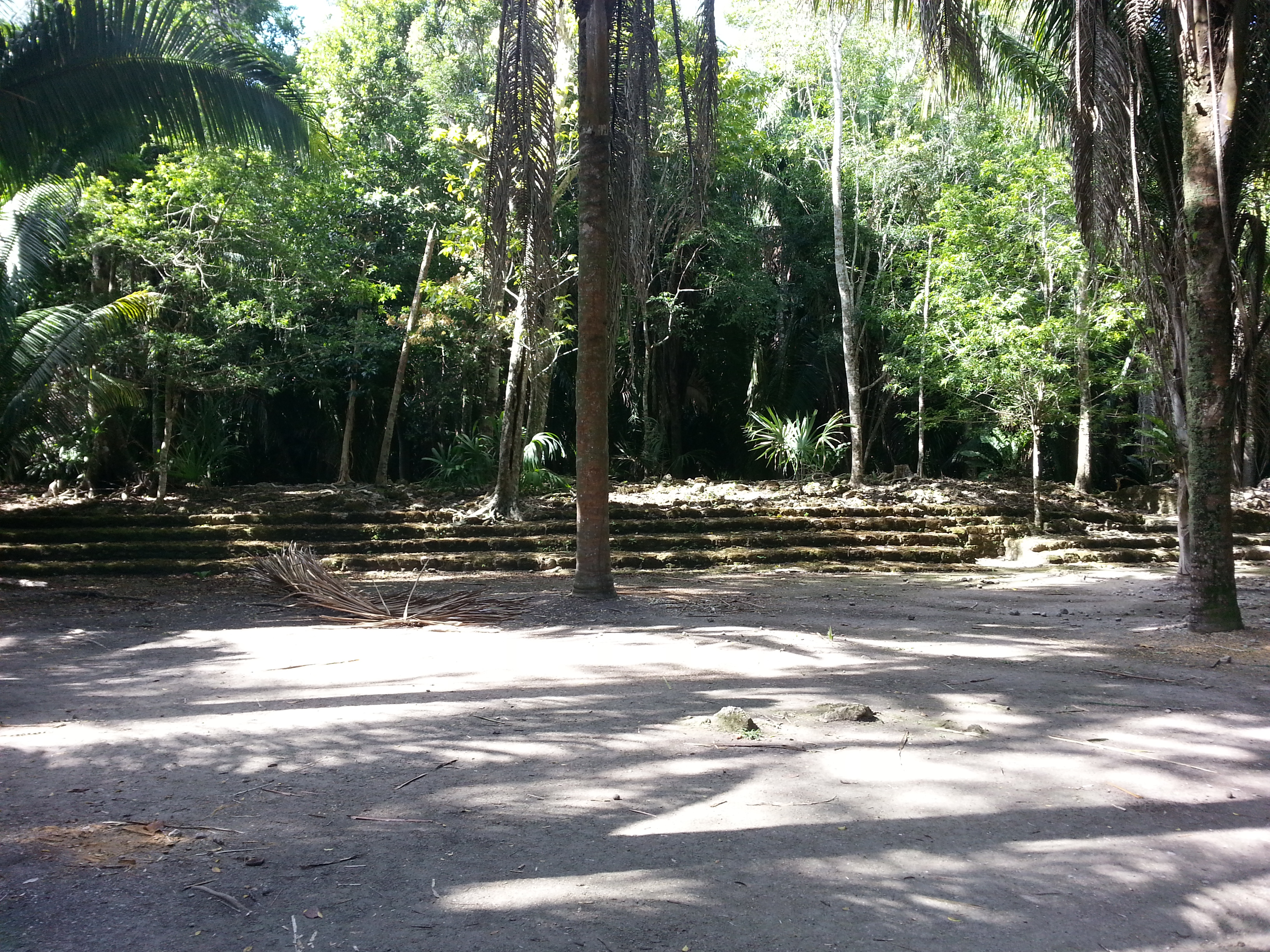
Along the path between the larger temples there is a small grouping of stone footings and stairs from some of the homes built on this site.
