= Xpuhil =

Maya archaeological site in Mexico

Coordinates: 18°30′38″N 89°24′21″W

- Xpujil
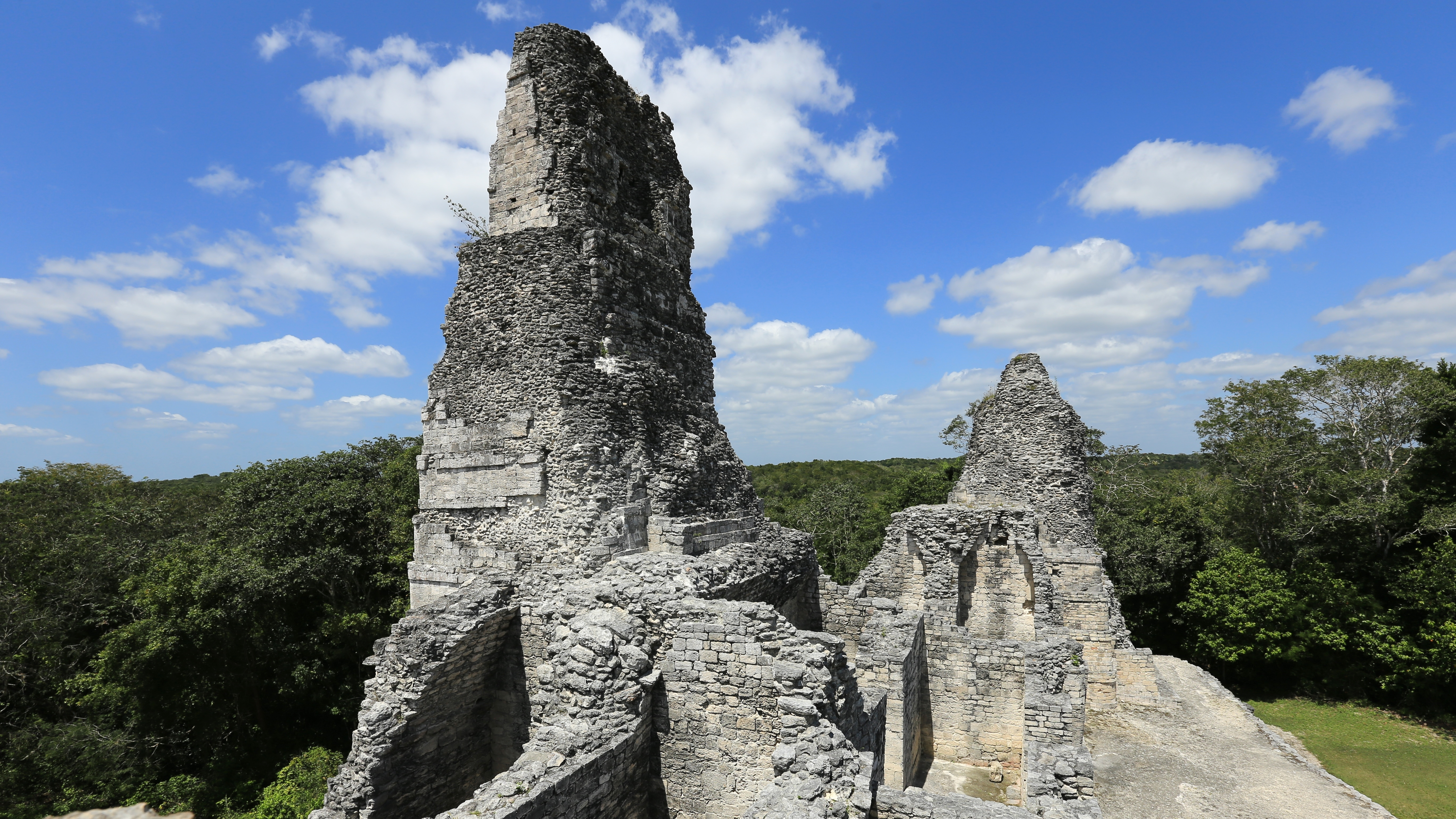
- Structure 1
- Interactive map of Xpuhil
- Type: Ancient Maya city
- Periods: Preclassic - Classic
- Cultures: Maya civilization
- Location: Mexico
- Region: Calakmul Biosphere Reserve

Site notes
- Architectural style: Río Bec

Xpuhil Pronounced:/ʃpuχil̥/ (also Xpujil) is a Maya archaeological site located in the Mexican state of Campeche, in the vicinity of the modern-day town of Xpujil. The area surrounding Xpuhil inside the Calakmul Biosphere Reserve, along Federal Highway 186, is rich with other Maya sites, including Becan, Chicanná and Calakmul. The name xpuhil means "cat's tail" in reference to a type of vegetation found locally.

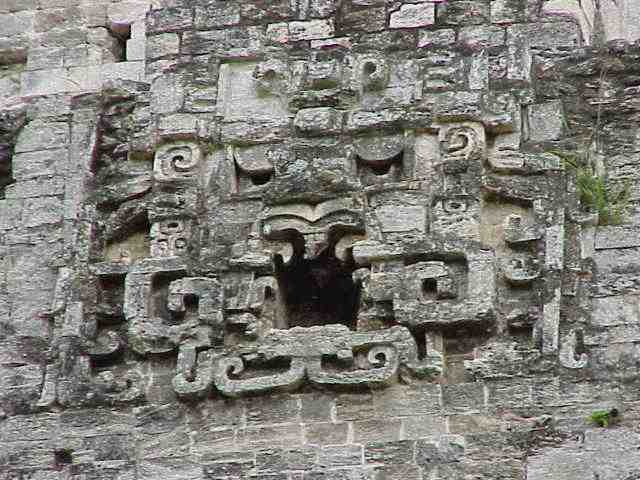
A detailed look at the face on the rear of the middle tower of Structure I. Some sources say this is a jaguar face.

Altogether, the archaeological zone spans about 5 square kilometers and contains multiple smaller architectural clusters. For identification purposes, archaeologists have labeled some of these groups with Roman numerals, while others remain unnamed. Other groups have been given landmark names, such as Xpuhil Cuartel.

Reconstructive drawing of Structure I by Tatiana Proskouriakoff

== History of the Site ==
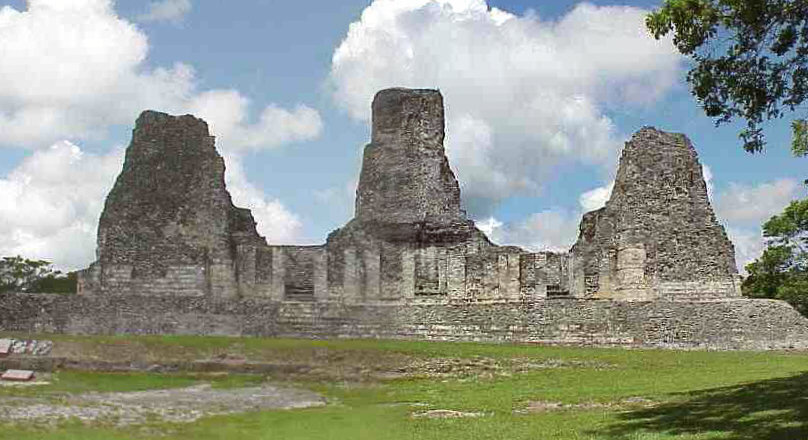
Xpujil as it appeared in 2000.

Archaeological evidence at the site indicates that Xpuhil could have been settled as early as the Early Classic period, but the majority of architecture and artifacts from the site appear to be from the end of the Classic period. The INAH estimates occupation to be somewhere between 300 and 1200 AD. However, more exact dates are impossible to estimate due to the architectural variations between this site and other Río Bec style settlements.

After centuries of abandonment, Xpuhil was rediscovered by Karl Ruppert and John Denison in 1938. After this discovery, the site was shown to archaeologist and architectural draftswoman Tatiana Proskouriakoff, who was able to make a detailed reconstruction drawing of Structure I in 1943. This could not have been done nearly as accurately today, because the structures have deteriorated a large amount since Proskouriakoff’s work in the 1940s.

Since its rediscovery, the site has been targeted by looters for pieces of its complex facades.

=== Xpuhil Cuartel ===
One interesting area of Xpuhil is that of Xpuhil Cuartel, which stands within a Mexican army camp approximately 2 km south-southeast of the three-towered Structure I. This area was discovered in January 1999 and subsequent reconstruction occurred from June to October of that same year. Its name, Xpuhil Cuartel, means “Xpuhil barracks” due to its juxtaposition with the army camp.

== Architecture ==
To date, several groups of constructions have been uncovered in the region, which loosely follow late Classic Río Bec architectural canons.

Structure I is the most notable structure in this region, due to its atypical three-tower construction instead of the usual two. This structure includes three towers, roof combs, steep stairways, and non-functional doors. It is hypothesized that it may have been constructed in an effort to mimic the style of pyramid-temples found in Tikal and elsewhere.

Characteristic of the architectural style found at Xpuhil is the construction of “false” temples. That is, they are not really functional as living or performance spaces due to their irregular interior spaces and steep, unclimbable stairways. It is unknown precisely why the ancient Maya built them this way.
