= Jerry Sabloff =

American anthropologist

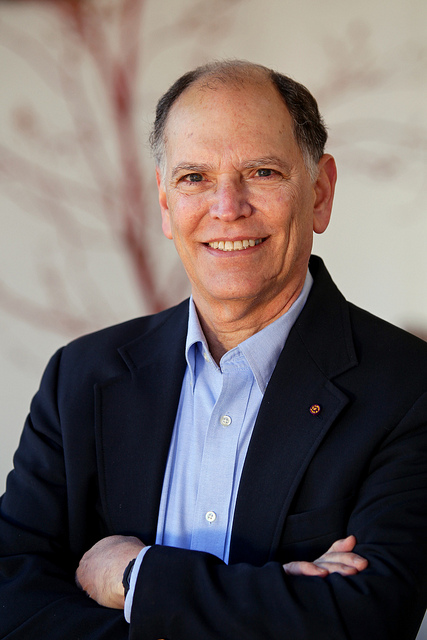
Jerry Sabloff

Jeremy "Jerry" Arac Sabloff (born 1944) is an American anthropologist and past president of the Santa Fe Institute. Sabloff is an expert on ancient Maya civilization and pre-industrial urbanism. His academic interests have included settlement pattern studies, archaeological theory and method, the history of archaeology, the relevance of archaeology in the modern world, complexity theory, and trans-disciplinary science.

Sabloff received his bachelor's degree from the University of Pennsylvania and his PhD in 1969 from Harvard, where his doctoral supervisor was archaeologist Gordon Willey.

He was the Christopher H. Browne Distinguished Professor of Anthropology at the University of Pennsylvania, as well as the Williams Director of the University of Pennsylvania Museum (1994–2004) and interim director of the museum (2006–2007). He also has taught at Harvard University, the University of Utah, the University of New Mexico (where he was chair of the Department of Anthropology), and the University of Pittsburgh (where he was chair of the Department of Anthropology). He retired as Santa Fe Institute president on July 31, 2015.

Sabloff is an outspoken proponent of science communication. In 2010 he delivered the distinguished lecture at the American Anthropological Association's annual meeting, encouraging anthropologists to make their work accessible to their relevant publics and cultivate a new generation of scientist-communicators.

Sabloff is past president of the Society for American Archaeology, a past anthropology section chair of the American Association for the Advancement of Science, and past editor of American Antiquity.

He has served as chair of the Smithsonian Science Commission (2001–2003). He is a member of the National Academy of Sciences and the American Philosophical Society, and is a fellow of the American Academy of Arts and Sciences. He also is a fellow of both the Society of Antiquaries, London, and the American Association for the Advancement of Science.

He is the author of Excavations at Seibal: Ceramics (1975), The Cities of Ancient Mexico (1989,1997), The New Archaeology and the Ancient Maya (1990), and Archaeology Matters (2008). He is co-author of A History of American Archaeology (1974, 1980, 1993), A Reconnaissance of Cancuen, Peten, Guatemala (1978), Ancient Civilizations: The Near East and Mesoamerica (1979, 1995), Cozumel: Late Maya Settlement Patterns (1984), and The Ancient Maya City of Sayil (1991). He has edited or co-edited 12 books, the most recent of which is (with Paula L.W. Sabloff) New Perspectives on the Development of Complex Societies (2018).

Sabloff resides in Pleasanton, CA. He is married to anthropologist Paula L.W. Sabloff.

== Honors ==
- 2016 Alfred Vincent Kidder Award for Eminence in the Field of American Archaeology, awarded by the American Anthropological Association; 2014 Lifetime Achievement Award, awarded by the Society for American Archaeology;

2014 Lucy Wharton Drexel Medal, awarded by the University of Pennsylvania Museum; 2011 Excellence in Latin American and Caribbean Archaeology Award, awarded by the Society for American Archaeology
