= Chicanná =

Ancient Mayan town

Coordinates: 18.5069°N 89.4863°W

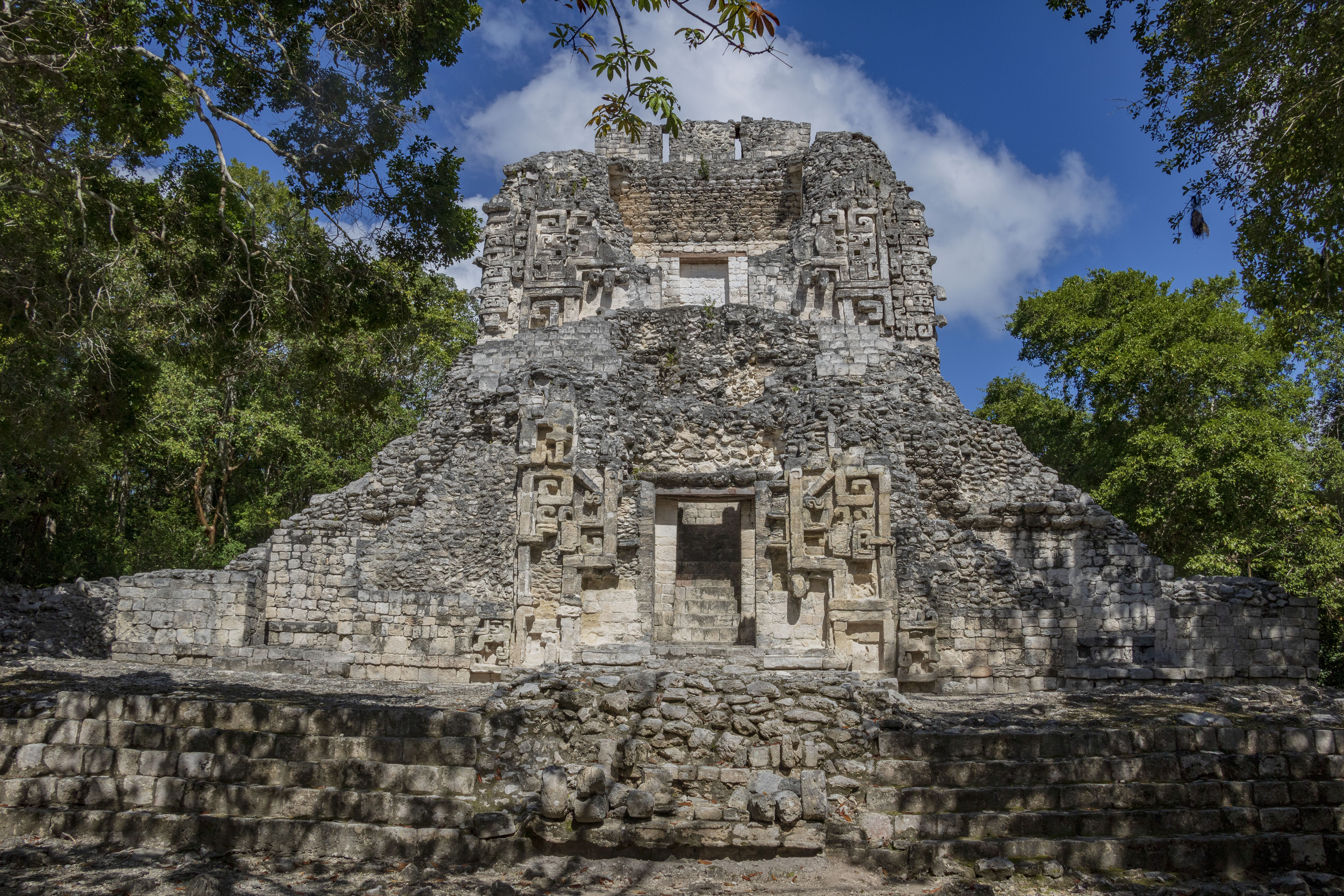
- Structure XX of Chicanná

- Location within Mexico Location within Campeche
- Type: Ancient Maya city
- Periods: Classic
- Cultures: Maya civilization
- Location: Mexico
- Region: Río Bec

History
- Built: 300 BC - 1000 AD
- Abandoned: 1100 AD

Site notes
- Architectural style: Río Bec - Puuc
- Archaeologists: Jack D. Eaton

Chicanná was a Maya city that was built during the Classic period (600 AD to 830 AD). The site was named after its most famous building, Structure II, which means "House of the Serpent Mouth" in Maya. In the Maya language chi means "mouth", can means "serpent" and ná means "house". The site is located two kilometers west of Becán in Calakmul Biosphere Reserve of the Mexican state of Campeche on the Yucatán Peninsula. It is one of 45 other ruin sites located within that area.

Chicanná was inhabited from the late Preclassic period in the year 300 B.C. to the early Posclassic period in 1100 A.D., but was thought to have reached its peak from 500 to 800 A.D. There is evidence that Chicanná may have been dependent on Becán for much of its existence, since Becán was self-sufficient. Chicanná is one of the most striking examples in the region of the mixing of architectural styles with its stunning detailed buildings. Its buildings have features of the Río Bec, Chenes and even the Puuc style from the north. It does not have large pyramids, but relatively small buildings with great ornateness and high quality of decoration including monumental masks of the god Itzamná in the structures suggests that it was a center for the Río Bec region elite whose capital was the city of Becán.

The city of Chicanná is widely known for one of its well-preserved doorways with interesting detail representing the face of Itzamná; the city reached its prime during the late classical period. The city of Chicanná is small. However, it is considered to be home for the elites and rulers of Becán. After continuous research on Chicanná site, knowledge grew which eventually led to the questioning of previous ideas associated with the style of sculptures in central Yucatán. Jack D. Eaton rediscovered Chicanná in 1966 during his exploration of the Yucatán. Chicanná is a site that takes advantage of the natural elevation found in the region so structures seem higher and, for the Maya, closer to the god. This settlement was most used for important spiritual ceremonies and rituals for the Mayans.

== Discovery ==
Chicanná is located in the state of Campeche, and is part of the ancient Maya Rio Bec region. The site was first studied by Jack Eaton in 1966 while exploring the Yucatán. The most famous building at the site, Structure II, was studied later during excavations in 1970. The core of Chicanná consists of seven buildings. Structure I, II, and III make up the Main Plaza. Four outlying structures surround the Main Plaza. The most well-known structures at Chicanná are Structures I and II. Structures I and II are both temples situated within the main plaza and have been interpreted to be aligned with solar movements for calendar-keeping purposes.

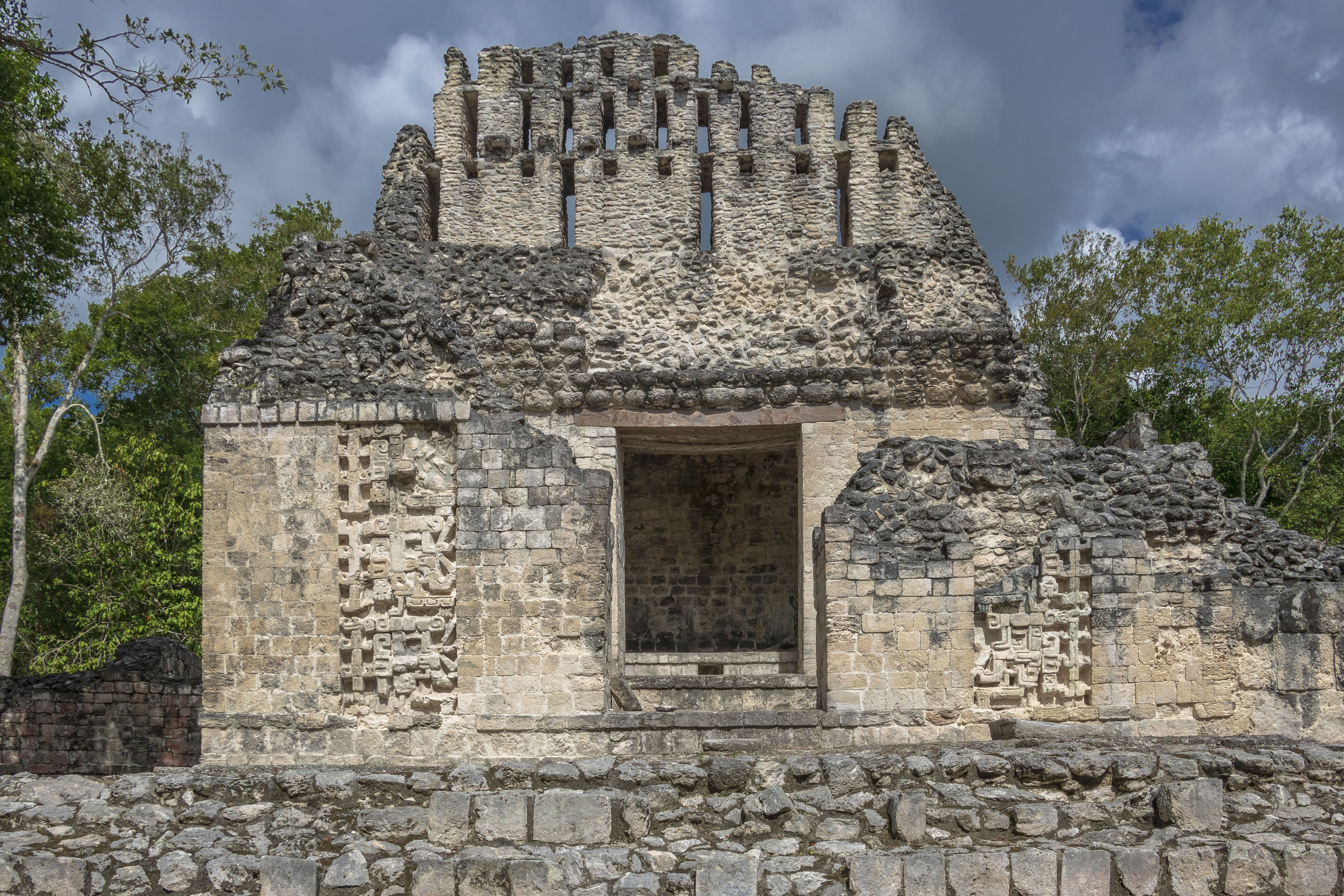
Structure VI

Based on radiocarbon dating of charcoal and other organic materials at the site, both Structures I and II are dated to the Late Classic period. Chicanná was built in multiple phases. Structure XI, positioned adjacent to Structure X, was assembled first based on the ceramic sequence of materials found. Ceramic analysis also supports the radiocarbon data that suggests Structures I and II were built sometime later during the Late Maya Classic Period.

== Specific structures ==
Structure I is a temple located in the main plaza characterized by four relief panels constructed in the Rio Bec style. The Rio Bec style is defined as a temple pyramid built in the central Maya lowlands. Unlike other architectural styles in the Maya Lowlands, Rio Bec architecture style is characterized by structures positioned at greater distance from one another, resulting in a less dense site layout. Other sites with the Rio Bec architectural style include Becan and Xpuhil, both located within 3 km from Chicanná. Due to their location and similar architectural style, Becan and Xpuhil are believed to have interacted with and were connected to Chicanná. Structure I consists of six total rooms and with five risers facing inward towards the plaza.

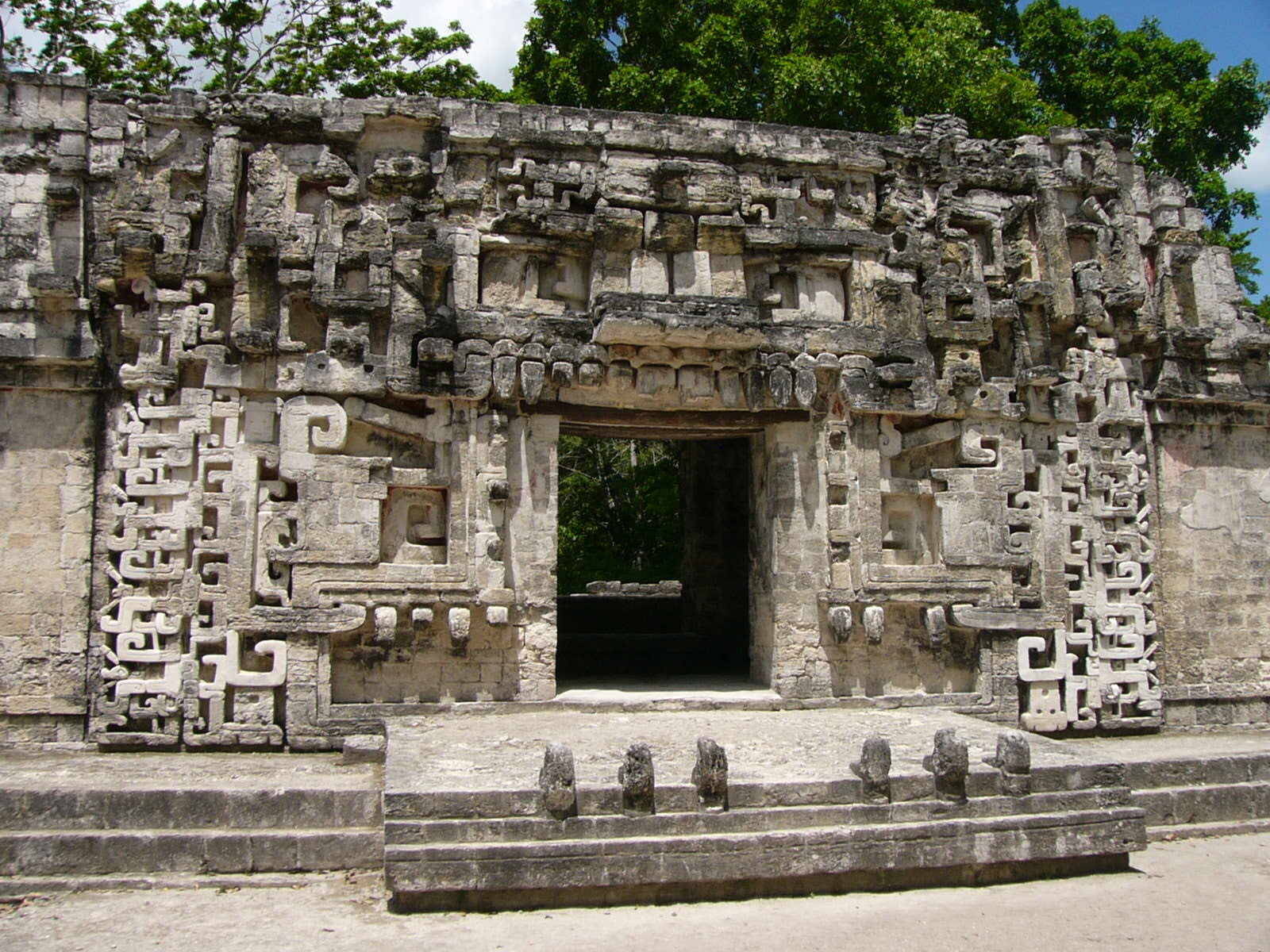
Structure II

Also, part of the main plaza is Structure II. Structure II is a smaller building and the most well-known building at the site. Structure II contains a well-preserved relief sculpture of a serpent. The name of the site, Chicanná, was derived and influenced from the serpent relief sculpture on this structure. Structure II is composed of eight total rooms. Plaster walls within the interior of each room contain images depicting animals, monsters, clothes, and other structures on the plaster walls. Structure II's entrance door has been interpreted by archaeologists as the face of god Itzamná opening its mouth surrounded by ferocious teeth.
