= Becan =

Archaeological site in Mexico

Coordinates: 18°31′N 89°28′W

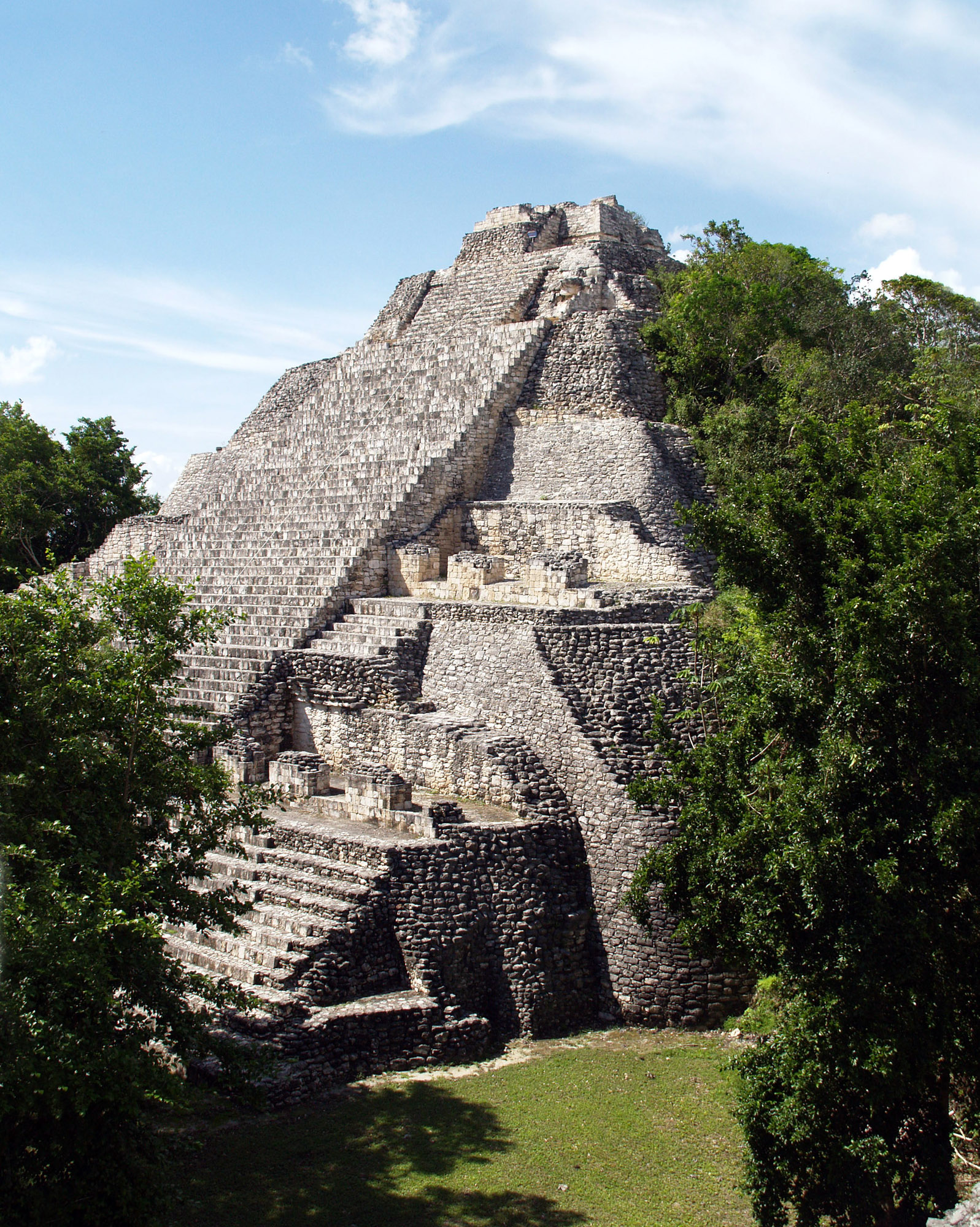
Structure IX.

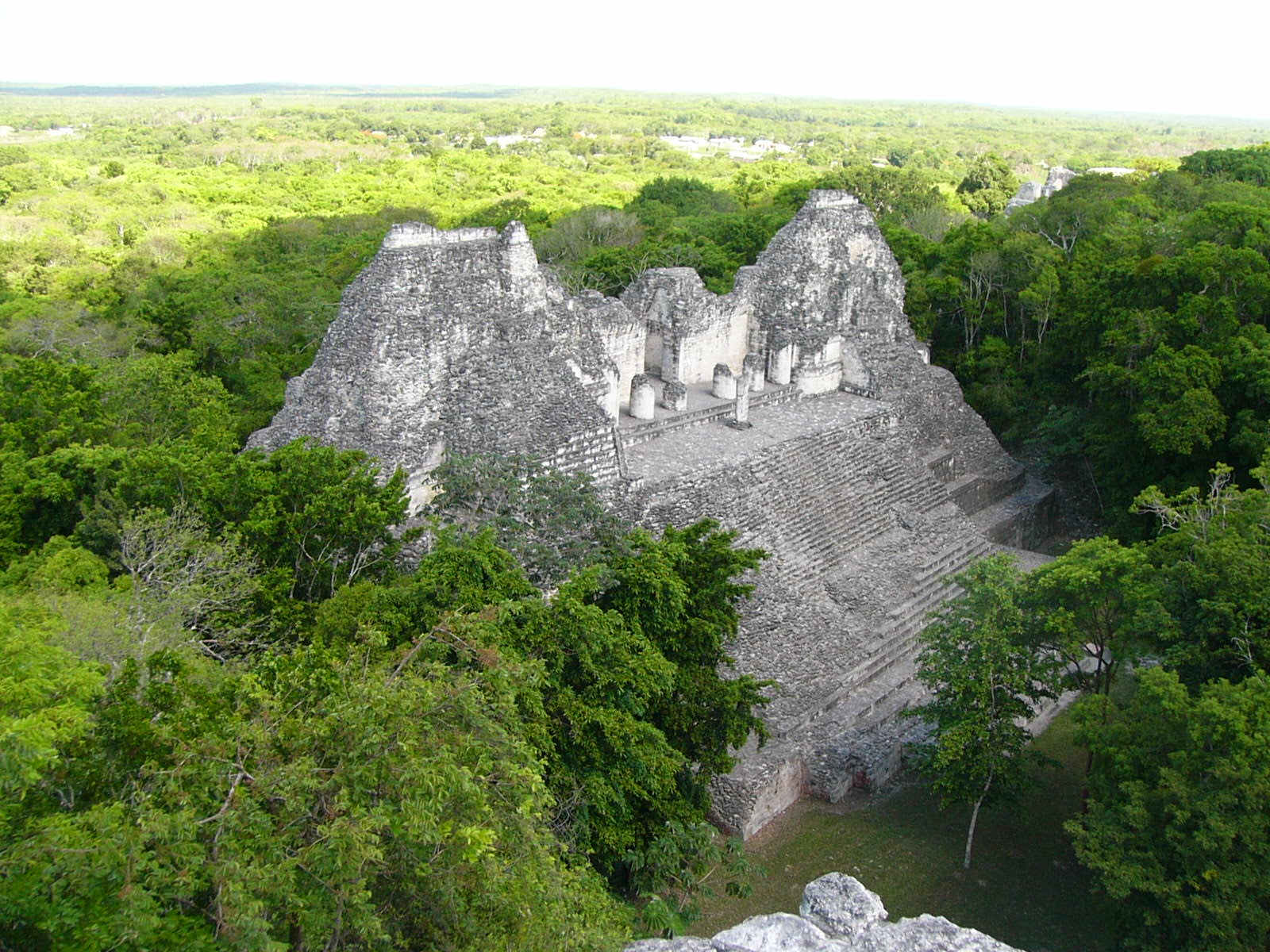
Structure VIII.

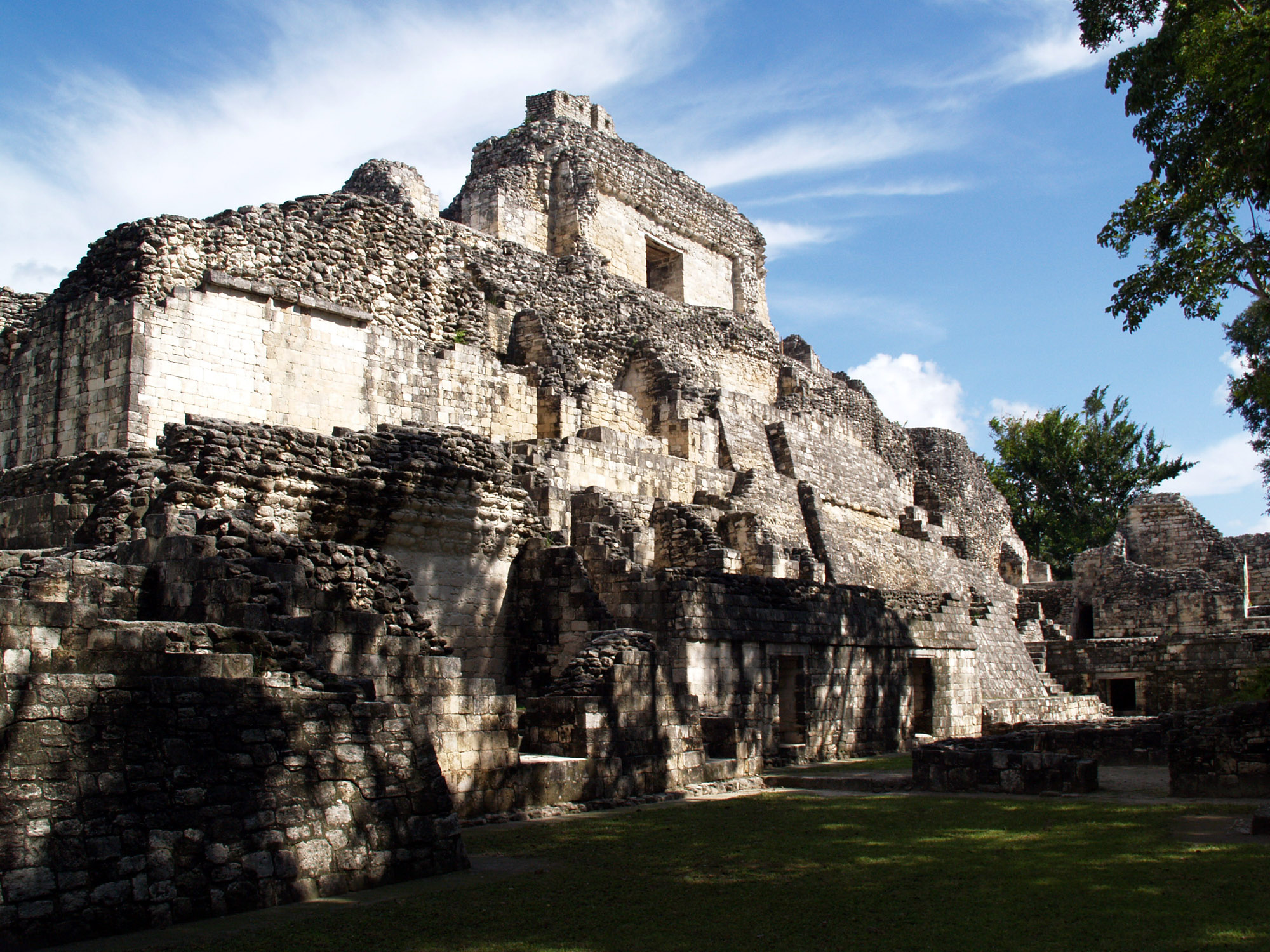
Structure IV.

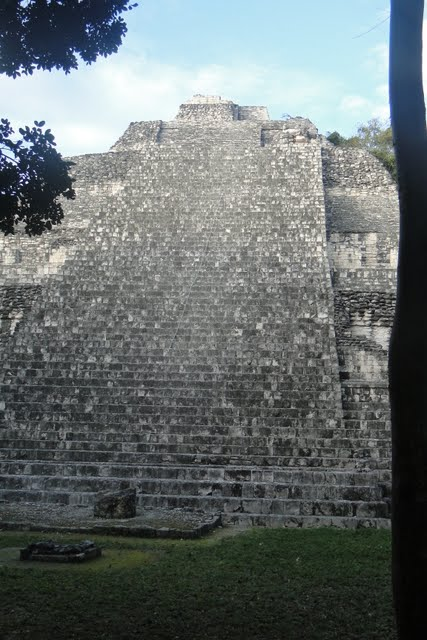
Outside stairway, Structure IX

Becan (Spanish: Becán) is an archaeological site of the Maya civilization in pre-Columbian Mesoamerica. Becan is located near the center of the Yucatán Peninsula, in the present-day Mexican state of Campeche, about 150 km (93.2 mi) north of Tikal. The Maya sites of Balamku, Calakmul, Chicanna and Xpuhil are nearby. The name Becan was bestowed on the site by archaeologists who rediscovered the site, meaning "ravine or canyon formed by water" in Yukatek Maya, after the site's most prominent and unusual feature, its surrounding ditch.

== History ==
Archaeological evidence shows that Becan was occupied in the middle Preclassic Maya period, about 550 BCE, and grew to a major population and ceremonial center a few hundred years later in the late Preclassic. The population and scale of construction declined in the early classic (c 250 CE), although it was still a significant site, and trade goods from Teotihuacan have been found. A ditch and ramparts were constructed around the site at this time. There is a ditch that runs the circumference of the city which covers approximately 25 hectares (61.7 acres). Around 500 the population again increased dramatically and many large new buildings were constructed, mostly in the Rio Bec style of Maya architecture. Construction of major buildings and elite monuments stopped about 830, although ceramic evidence show that the site continued to be occupied for some time thereafter, although the population went into decline and Becan was probably abandoned by about 1200.

The site was first documented in the archaeological literature in 1934 by archaeologists Karl Ruppert and John Denison on an expedition to the region sponsored by the Carnegie Institution of Washington, who named it "Becan" after the conspicuous ditch surrounding the center of the city; the ancient name of the site is not known. From 1969 to 1971 archaeological excavations were made at Becan sponsored by Tulane University and the National Geographic Society.

In 1984, while conducting research at the site, one of Mexico's "most important archeologists", Román Piña Chán, fell from the pyramid at Becán, becoming paralyzed. On 13 July 2001, at a homage paid to Piña by the National Museum of Anthropology, it was announced that Lucía Campaña, had discovered a pre-Hispanic tomb in the ninth building at the site, the previous day.
