= Calakmul Biosphere Reserve =

Reserve in Yucatan, Mexico

- Reserva de la Biosfera de Calakmul
- IUCN category VI (protected area with sustainable use of natural resources)
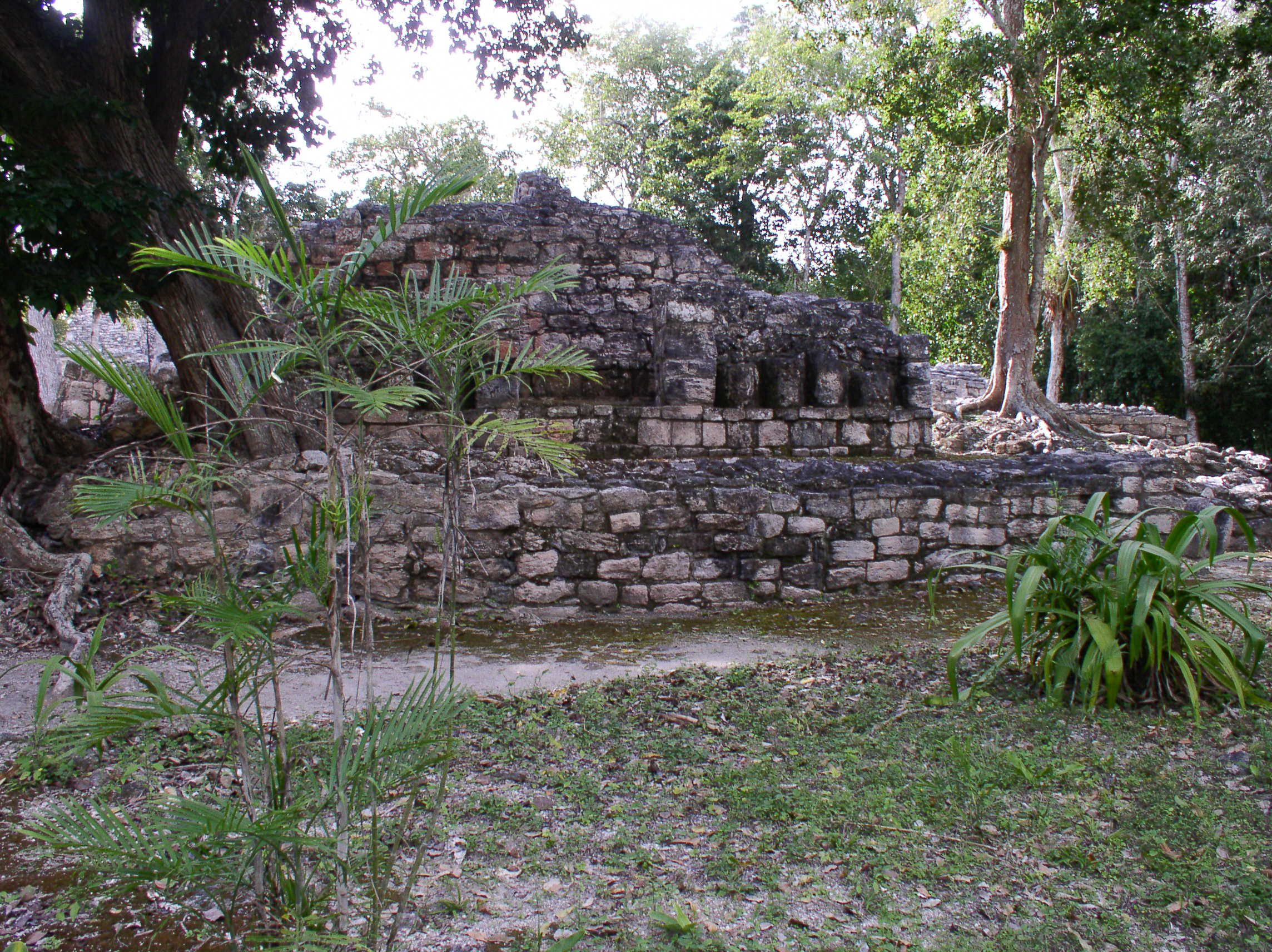
- Mayan ruins of Calakmul

- Location within Mexico
- Location: Calakmul Municipality, Campeche, Mexico
- Coordinates: 18.612°N 89.548°W
- Area: 7,231 km^{2} (2,792 mi^{2})
- Established: 1989
- Governing body: National Commission of Natural Protected Areas

The Calakmul Biosphere Reserve (Spanish: Reserva de la Biósfera de Calakmul) is located in the southern part of the Yucatán Peninsula in Mexico, in Calakmul Municipality in the state of Campeche, bordering the Guatemalan department of El Petén to the south.

The 7,231 km^{2} (2,792 mi^{2}) Reserve, which was established in 1989, is one of the largest protected areas in Mexico, covering more than 14% of the state. The important pre-Columbian Maya civilization archaeological site of Calakmul, one of the largest-known Maya sites, is located in the Biosphere Reserve.

== Flora and fauna ==
The Reserve and the contiguous forested areas of the Maya Biosphere Reserve (Reserva de la Biosfera Maya) in the Guatemalan department of El Petén form one of the largest and least disturbed tracts of rainforest in the Americas north of Colombia. The forest is classified as dry forest to the west and tall and medium-height subperennial rainforest to the east. Among the trees, there are ceibas, Honduras mahogany (Swietenia macrophylla), strangler figs (Ficus spp.), chaká (Bursera simaruba), and chicle or chicozapote (Manilkara chicle). In total, the reserve is home to nearly 70,000 plant and animal species, making it one of the most biodiverse places in the world.

The biosphere is home to 86 species of mammals, 18 of which can be found in the Official Registry of Mexican Ecology, a resource that outlines flora and fauna that are in danger of extinction, rare, threatened or are under protection. The area is home to 5 of the 6 large cats that are native to Mexico. This includes its small but healthy population of jaguars as well as jaguarundis, ocelots, pumas and margays. The fauna also includes Central American agoutis, Geoffroy's spider monkeys, Yucatán black howlers, Baird's tapir, white-nosed coatis, ocellated turkeys, crested guans, toucans, and parrots.

== Threats ==
The reserve has been given a critically threatened designation, which means that prompt measures must be taken to continue to protect and conserve its biodiversity. These threats include: Population growth, subsistence hunting and poaching, tourist infrastructure, and the emergence of highways and roads.

Human population within the reserve has been rapidly increasing since the 1980s due to increased migration as well as high birthrates. This has put increasing strain on natural resources due to the locals' agricultural and ranching subsistence.

Although 80% of the hunting in the reserve is done for personal consumption among the local people, this subsistence hunting has had an increasingly drastic impact on the wildlife populations. These animals are also being poached by military units that are in active duty within the area.

There has been an increasing amount of tourist activity, since the reserve was given UNESCO designation, which has created several problems. Although water is scarce in the region, the consumable water near villages or towns is reserved for tourists, creating a water shortage among the locals. There is growing awareness of a possible water crisis due to the inability to meet the needs of the locals and the tourism industry.

Due to problems with the design of the reserve, two main roads have been built that cross through two of the core, important areas of the reserve. There have been proposals of a tourism destination called Maya World which would involve a highway connecting different areas of the biosphere reserve. Although the plans for the highway have been put aside for the time being, hotel construction continues in those areas.

== Political issues ==
The area was declared a biosphere reserve by Carlos Salinas de Gortari in 1989. The cited reasons for the designation were protection of biological diversity, as well as protection of the numerous ancient Mayan ruins that are within the limits of the reserve. Since then there has been disparity between the views and philosophies of the local people who live on the land and those government officials and urban environmentalists who wish to protect its resources .

The people who live on the land are migrants representing 23 of the 32 states of Mexico that were drawn to the land in the 1960s when the Mexican government put land distribution projects in place. Although their cultures may differ, they share the common identity of campesinos and of subsistence farmers who live off the land. As subsistence farmers they all share the common belief that the environment is a place to work, which contrasts with the agendas of environmentalists and government official who believe that an "ideal environment is one devoid of human presence". These outside parties have the "do not touch" mentality. Thus the Campesinos have created a united front in pushing for access to important resources that enable them to farm and provide for themselves.

In 1991 the Mexican president gave the Campesinos "care for the reserve" which provided funding to aid in the protection of the remaining forests while encouraging self-sufficiency in the local farming sector. This has been in line with the philosophy that biodiversity is "diversity in use".

These issues of debate has led to a resistance movement from the local farmers. Due to their beliefs surrounding the uses of the environment and work, many believe that those on the other side of the debate (government officials and urban environmentalists) wish to use the land for their own profitable means. Many farmers recognize the difference between symbolic and actual land ownership and feel as though the government is undermining their subsistence practices. Whereas the Campesinos practice subsistence farming and therefore do not receive a salary, there is a high vulnerability that they face from others implementing regulations.
