= Río Bec =

Pre-Columbian Maya archaeological site

Coordinates: 18°22′24″N 89°21′32″W

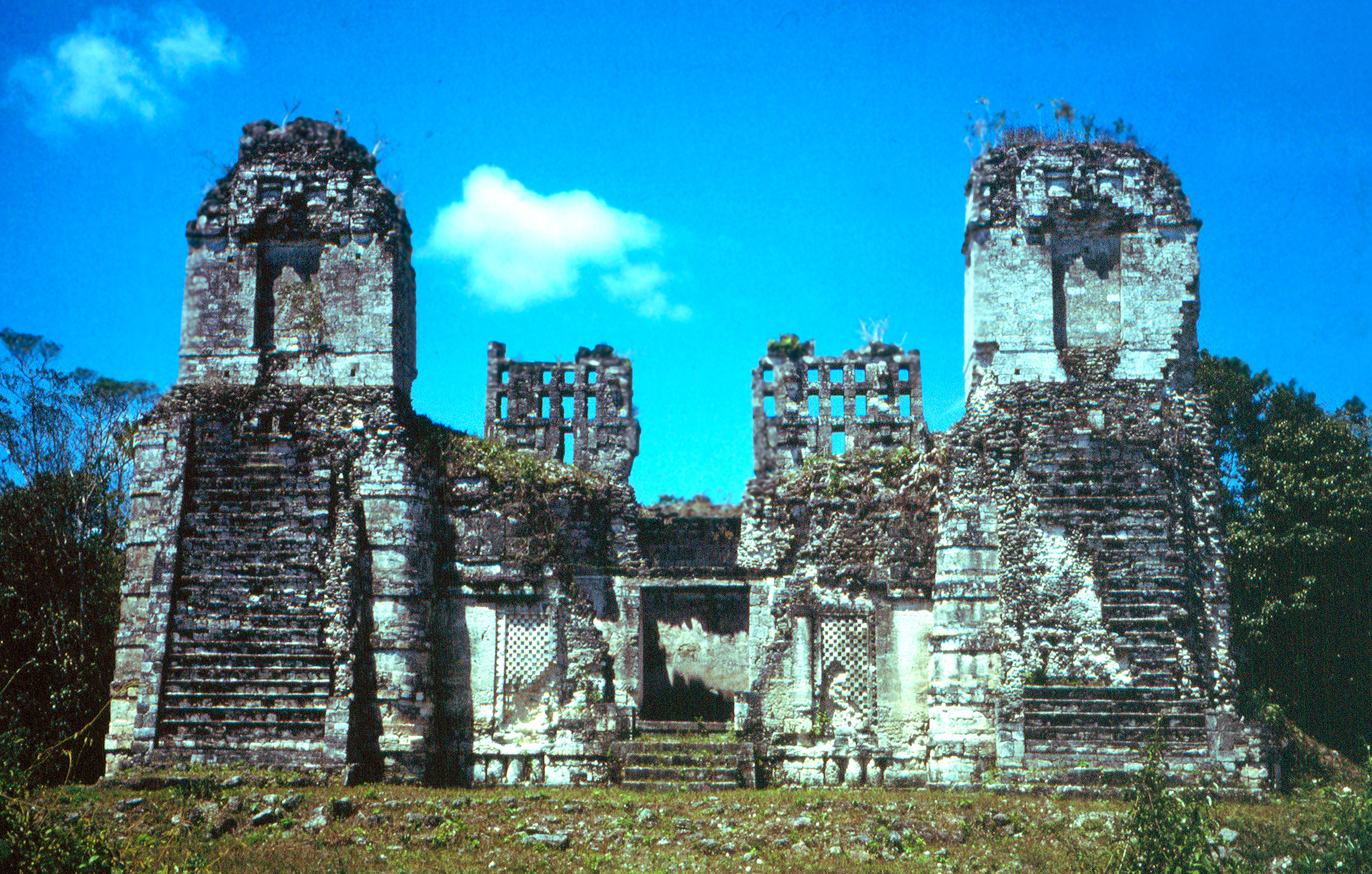
The main building of group Rio Bec B

Río Bec is a pre-Columbian Maya archaeological site located in what is now southern portion of the Mexican state of Campeche. The name also refers to an architectural style (Río Bec Style) that first appeared at Río Bec and subsequently spread to other nearby sites. The Río Bec Style is closely related to the Chenes architectural style found northwest of the Río Bec region.

== The archaeological site ==
The Río Bec site was first mentioned by Austrian explorer Teoberto Maler at the end of the 19th century, though he never visited the site. The French explorer Maurice de Perigny was the first European to visit and report on the Río Bec. The site is now being excavated and restored by a group of French archaeologists from the CNRS headed by Dominique Michelet. They have located several architectural groups and their surveys and maps of several square kilometers give us a better understanding of the ancient settlement. Excavation of the principal building at Río Bec A, a building with three towers and several rooms was underway in 2006.

== The Rio Bec architectural style ==
Río Bec temple pyramids are located in the central Maya lowlands. The temple-pyramids are characterized by a unique architectural style that began to appear during the seventh century A.D. and continued into the early twelfth century A.D. The temple-pyramids consist of a range-type building with typically two nonfunctional solid masonry towers on both ends of the range-type building. The twin-towers narrow with ascension in order to give an illusion of greater height. The twin-towers appear to have stairs along their faces leading to the temple that rests atop them. However, the steps are only a design motif that creates the illusion of functional stairs. Even if the steps were functional, the towers rise at steep vertical angles that would make ascending them difficult.

The temples, which are located on the platform at the top of the Río Bec towers are inoperative as well. The temples are solid masses with no interior rooms. Pseudo-doorways, which have been built into niches in the fronts of the temples, give the appearance of a functional door.

Despite their nonfunctional components, the Río Bec towers hold the typical decorations of a pyramid and its upper temple and at first glance are taken as functional pyramids. The purpose of the Río Bec temple-pyramids is unknown, but they do resemble the twin-tower complexes of Tikal.

== See also ==
- Kejache
