= Balamku =

Maya archaeological site in Mexico

Coordinates: 18°33′37″N 89°56′40″W

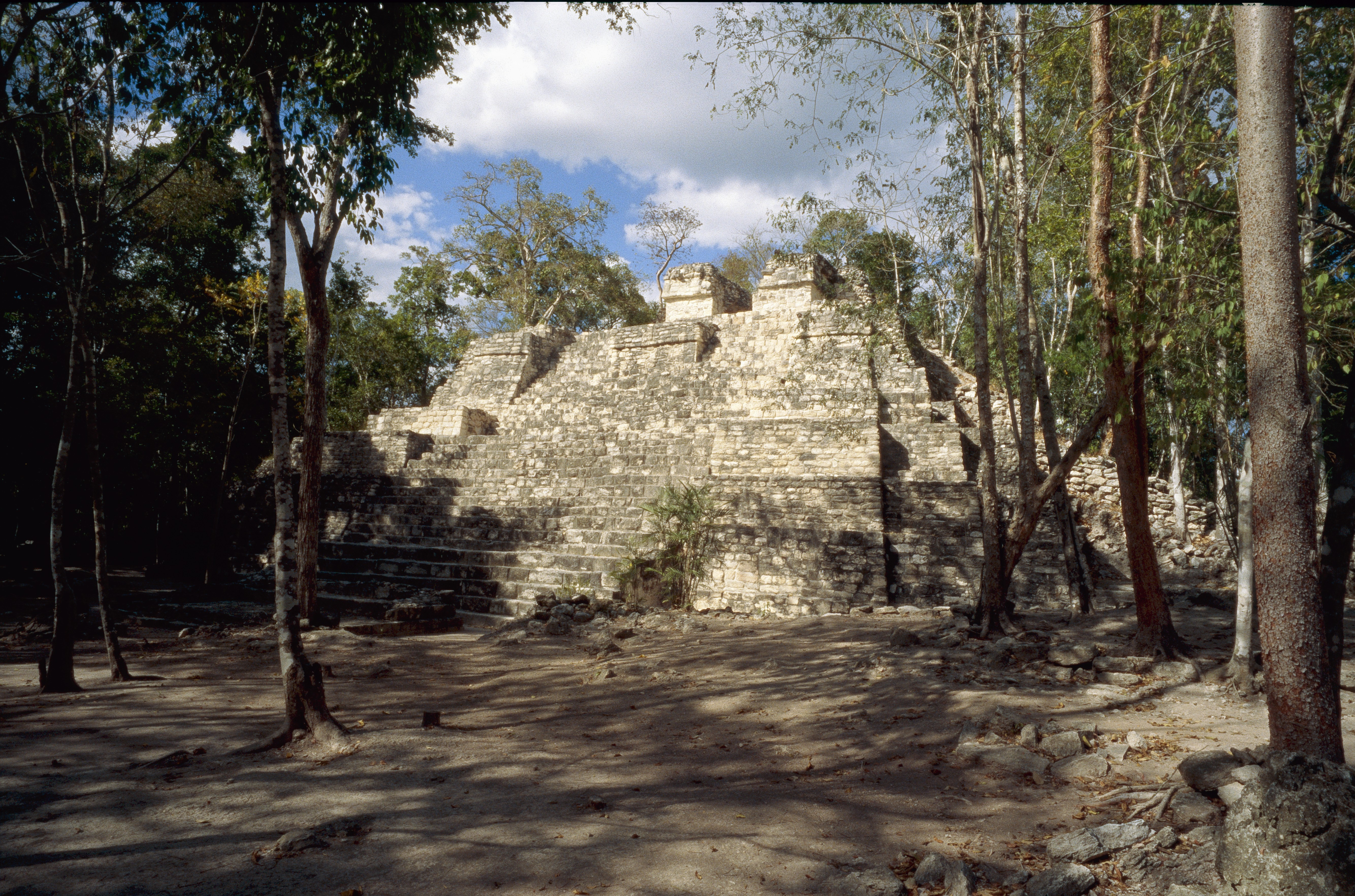
Temple pyramid at Balamku

Balamku is a small Maya archaeological site located in the Mexican state of Campeche. It features elaborate plaster facades dating to the Early Classic period. It has one of the largest surviving stucco friezes in the Maya world. Balamku was first occupied from around 300 BC. Its most important buildings date from AD 300–600.

== Location ==
Balamku is located 50 kilometres (31 mi) north of the ruins of the great Maya city of Calakmul, approximately the same distance west of Becan, 60 kilometres (37 mi) west of Xpujil and 12 kilometres (7.5 mi) southeast of the ruins of Nadzca'an. The ruins lie upon a poorly drained karstic plateau.

The architectural style of Balamku has more in common with the Petén tradition to the south, although Río Bec influences are also evident.

== History ==
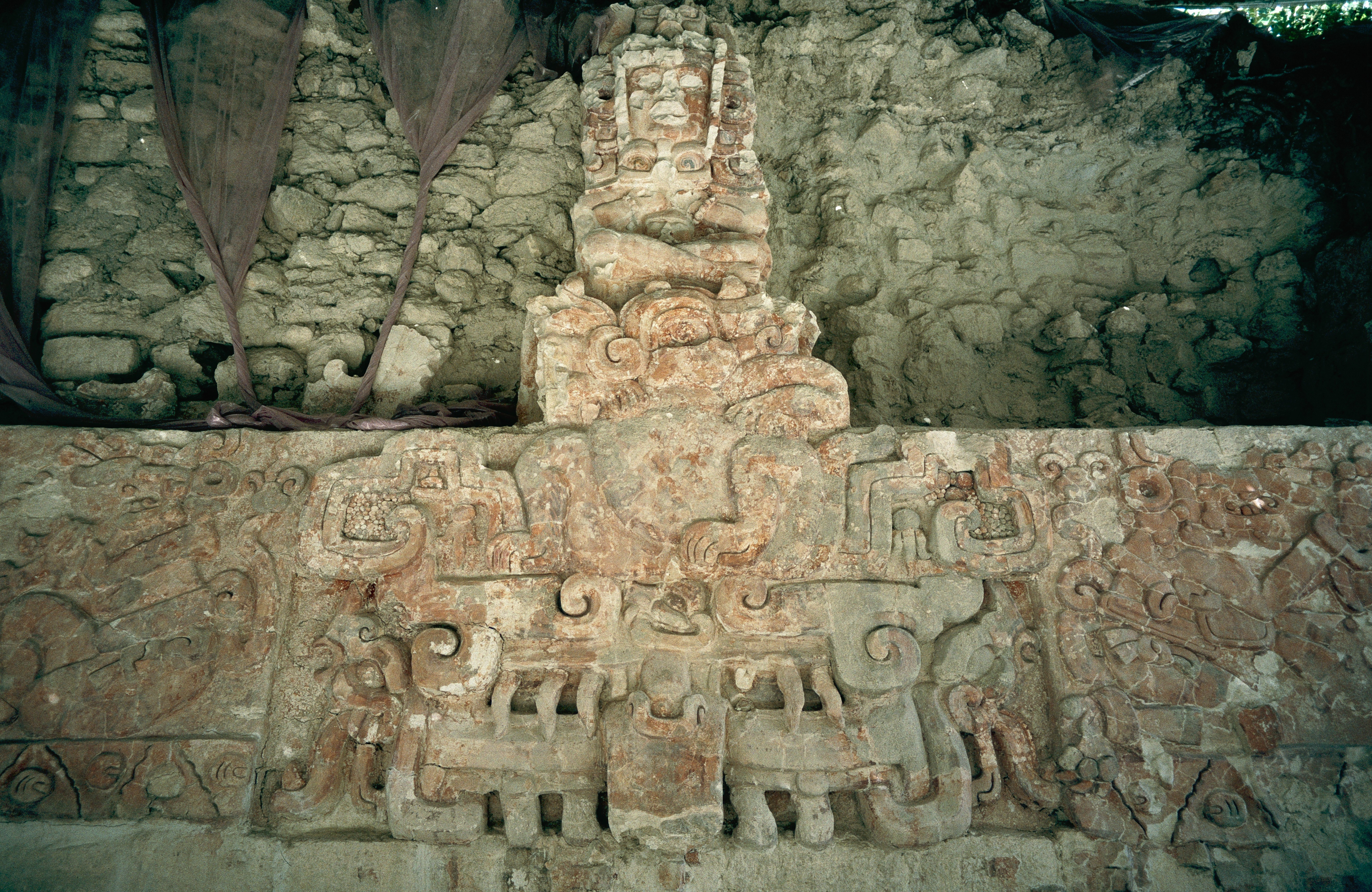
Section of stucco frieze in Structure I

Balamku was occupied from about 300 BC, in the Late Preclassic, through to the Terminal Classic period, between 800 and 1000 AD. The earliest architecture in the site is found in the Central and South Groups, dating to the Late Preclassic to Early Classic transition.

The ruins were discovered in 1990 by Mexican archaeologist Florentino García Cruz in the company of INAH custodians, when they investigated a report of archaeological looting; they found a looters' trench that had partly uncovered a painted stucco frieze that had originally formed part of the upper facade of an Early Classic building. After initial rescue work, the site was formally excavated in 1994 to 1995 by a team headed by Mexican archaeologist Ramón Carrasco and including two French archaeologists, Claude Baudez and Jean Pierre Courau. Carrasco and his Mexican team concentrated on the Central Group while the French archaeologists investigated the South Group.

== Site description ==
The ruins of Balamku cover an area of approximately 25 hectares (62 acres). The site features a very low density of peripheral architecture around the principal groups; by 100 metres (330 ft) away there are practically no further buildings.

=== Architectural Groups ===
The ruins are distributed in four major architectural groups. The Central and North Groups are situated close to water sources.

==== Central Group ====
The Central Group comprises three plazas, labelled as Plaza A, B and C.

Plaza A is situated at the southern extreme of the Central Group. It supports a Mesoamerican ballcourt and a number of mounds that have not yet been investigated archaeologically.

Plaza B is located in the northwestern sector of the Central Group. It is enclosed by Structure I on the north side, Structure IV on the south side, and structures V and VI on the east and west sides respectively. Test pits have uncovered architectural remains dating back to the Late Preclassic, the earliest phase of operation at the site.

Plaza C is separated from Plaza B by Structure V. It is bordered by Structure II on its north side and Structure III on its west side. It is enclosed on its south side by a number of unexcavated structures.

==== South Group ====
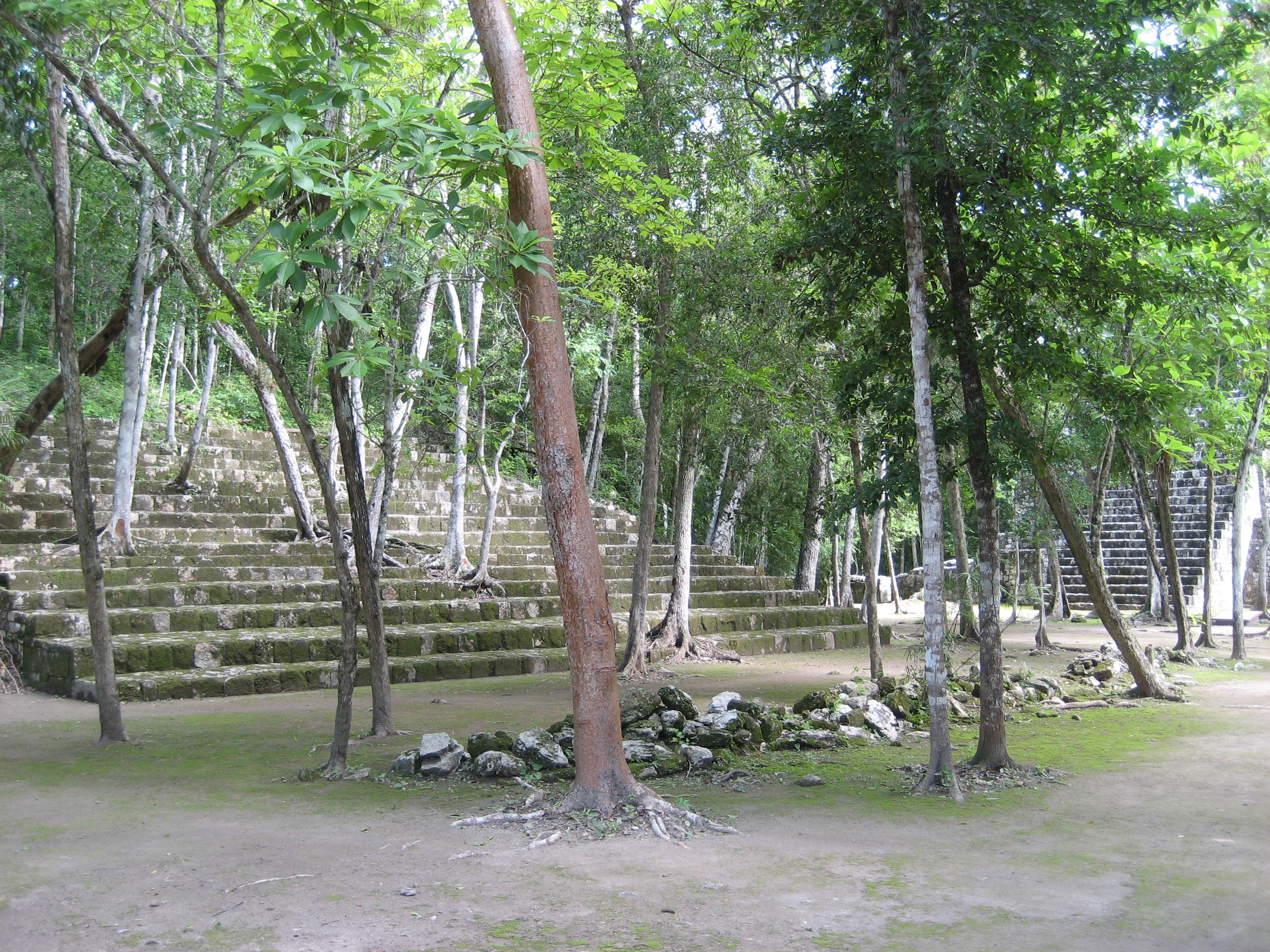
Structures in the South Group

The South Group comprises four plazas, labelled A through to D.

Plaza A is enclosed by Structure D5-5 on its north side. Structure D5-10 limits its western side and Structure D5-11 encloses it on the south side.

Plaza B has Structure D5-5 on its eastern side. Structure D5-10 is on the south side of the plaza and Structure D5-7 encloses the northern side of the plaza.

Plaza C is bordered by Structure D5-4 and Structure D5-6 on its east and south sides respectively.

Plaza D is enclosed by Structure D5-1 on its eastern side. Structure D5-2 limits the south side of the plaza and Structure D5-3 closes the plaza on the west side.

==== Southwest Group ====
The Southwest Group consists of two structures that together form an E-Group astronomical complex.

==== North Group ====
The North Group has not been excavated by archaeologists although it has been mapped. It consists of six plazas bordered by structures, some of which over 15 metres (49 ft) tall.

=== Structures ===
Structure I is located in the Central Group. Excavations of an earlier substructure (Sub I-A) have uncovered a stucco frieze stylistically dated to between the 4th century BC and the middle of the 6th century AD, although radiocarbon dating of the lintel of the structure returned a date of 631 AD ± 30 years. The frieze was first uncovered by looters and was fully excavated under the direction of INAH. The complete frieze measured 16.8 metres (55 ft) long when excavated and stood 1.75 metres (5.7 ft) high. The frieze combines imagery of rulers with that of a sacred mountain. The frieze preserved almost intact; it is protected by roofing and is accessible to visitors.

Structure D5-5 is located in the South Group between plazas B and C. Two burials were excavated in the structure, one of them was an elite status individual.

Structure D5-10, in the South Group, is built over two earlier structures dating to the Late Preclassic.

Structure D5-11 is located in the South Group, on the south side of Plaza A. It dates as far back as the Late Preclassic and is one of the earliest known buildings at Balamku.
