= Uxul =

Ancient Mayan city in Campeche, Mexico

Coordinates: 17.8567°N 89.9817°W

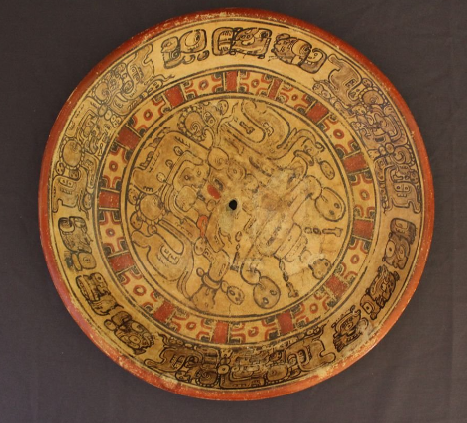
- Codex style plate that belonged to the Ch'ok (Maya prince) of Uxul called Yotoot Tihl.

- Location within Mexico Location within Campeche
- Type: Ancient Maya city
- Periods: Preclassic - Classic
- Cultures: Maya civilization
- Location: Mexico
- Region: Calakmul Biosphere Reserve, Campeche

History
- Built: 400 BC - 850 AD
- Abandoned: 900 AD

Site notes
- Discovered: 1934

Uxul is an ancient Maya settlement in the Campeche region of Mexico. Its construction dates back to the Preclassic period and was at the pinnacle of its existence in the classical period (circa 250 to 900 AD) a large Maya city with great political and military power. The archaeological site includes various architectural complexes with monumental structures, stelae and carved monuments with hieroglyphic inscriptions, a ball court, as well as numerous royal tombs containing skeletal remains and funeray burials. In Uxul, a large number of skeletan remains have been discovered, including skulls and complete skeletons in excellent state of preservation, found in various tombs and graves considered as some of the best-preserved archaeological discoveries in the entire Maya region. Uxul is a Mayan term meaning “at the end”, signifying its remoteness, however this was not the original name for the settlement, but a name coined by the two men who rediscovered it in 1934, Karl Ruppert and John H. Denison.

== Historical Importance ==
The settlement of Uxul dates back to the Preclassic period, although its greatest development occurred during the Classic and Late Classic periods. It was located in a densely populated area between larger Maya cities like Yaxnohcah to the east and Calakmul to the northeast. Uxul had trade connections that stretched as far south as modern-day Guatemala and to the Central Mexican Plateau. According to inscriptions, at approximately 630 A.D. Uxul was annexed under the rule of Calakmul, which was situated 26 kilometres away. During the late Classic period Uxul was closely related to Calakmul, the Maya city that dominated the region. In particular, Uxul shows a notable and close dependence on the Kaanu'l dynasty while ruling Calakmul, which gave the city and its rulers great political power.

Panel 4, located within Structure K2, shows the ruler of Calakmul Yuknoom Yich’aak K’ahk’ playing the Mesoamerican ballgame on the court of Uxul. A calendrical inscription dates this event in the Long Count date of 9.13.2.17.1 3 Imix 19 Kumk’uj, corresponding to February 9, 695 AD. This is also the last known mention of this ruler before his death.

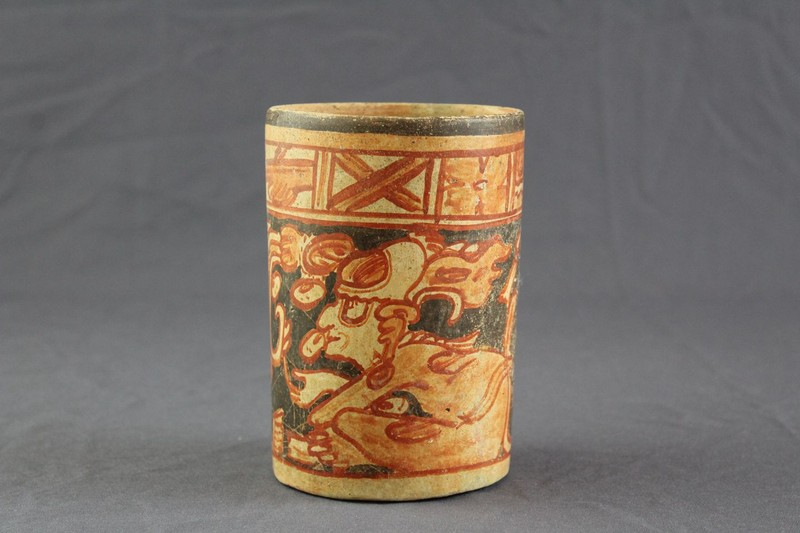
Vase with Itzamnaaj from Structure K2.

== Archaeological Discoveries ==
Archaeological operations have been conducted on Uxul since 2009 and this is primarily being managed by the University of Bonn in Germany and independent Mexican researchers.

Digging was first concentrated on uncovering and mapping the old walls of the city, which led to the discovery of two very large water reservoirs, known as aguadas. These aguadas were particularly remarkable in that the bottoms were sealed intricately with ceramics, which would have been an epic undertaking of work for those involved, given that the pools are each as large as ten Olympic-sized swimming pools.

=== Group K ===
Group K of Uxul is a large architectural complex that served as the residence and palace of the ruling elite of the city during the Late Classic period. It includes numerous structures that formed a palace, where the largest concentration of burials and royal tombs has been found, containing intact skeletons and grave goods. The tombs of Group K show a clear hierarchy based on the social status and power of the deceased, as evidenced by the quality and composition of the grave goods, this has been used to study the complexity of Maya society, even within the elite groups.

==== Structure K2 ====
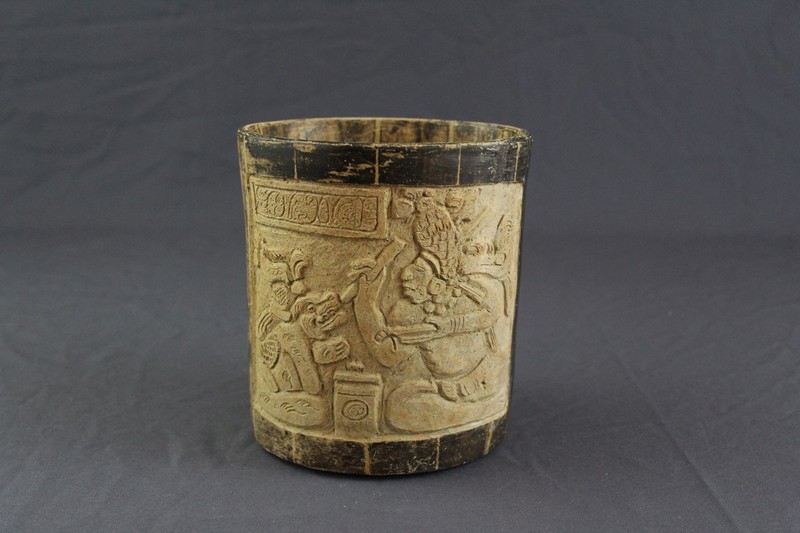
Vase with two scenes, one of them depicting a ruler in front of a creature with the glyph ook (dog).

The researchers at the site had expressed a worry that any tombs potentially located at the site might have been already raided by grave robbers searching for jewellery or ceramics. These fears were alleviated during an extraordinary find in August 2012; excavating a palace in the ruined city, archaeologists uncovered the ancient tomb of a young prince named Yotoot Tihl, alongside a rare artefact. A concealed entrance to a small burial chamber was found in the royal palace, leading to the remains of a 25-year-old man and nine ceramic objects. On one of the cups found, it contained a simple message saying, “[This is] the cup of the young man/prince”. Another of the cups bore a date thought to be 711 A.D., giving some indication of when the monarch was alive. Other vase shows 2 scenes; in one a seated ruler appears painting the face of a creature with the glyph ook (dog) and the second scene depicts a ruler seated on a throne talking to another elite member. The codex-style plate from Tomb 1 is finely decorated with a deity related to abundance from whose head sprouts maize and contains on the edge a hieroglyphic text that indicates that it was used for the ceremonial consumption of cacao, possibly to contain the fruit since this type of inscriptions are usually found more commonly on vessels, it then records that its owner was the Maya prince Yotoot Tihl. The interpretation of the inscription indicates this as: "Here it is written on the plate for cocoa of Yotoot Tihl."

==== Structure K4 ====
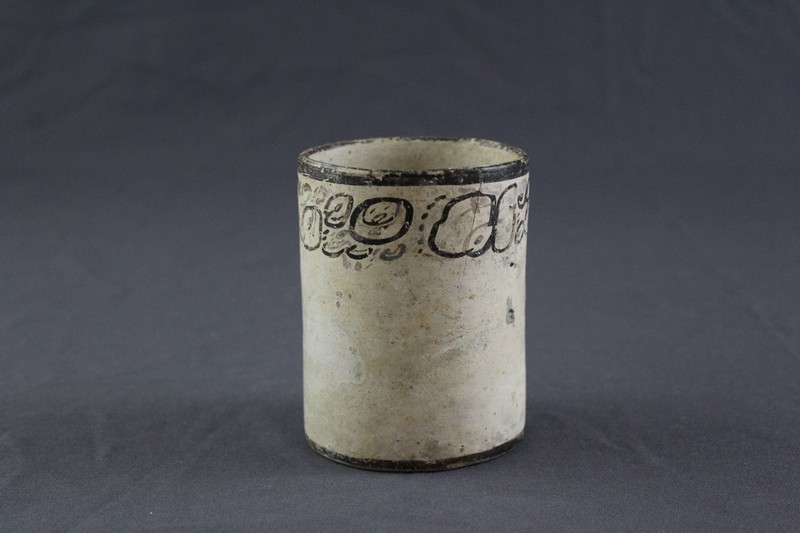
Hand-washing vase with an inscription indicating that it belonged to Telaj K'awiil of Uxul.

Structure K4 is after Structure K2 the second most important structure in the Group K. It was a building resembling a throne room where the ruling elite held ceremonies and rituals. Inside this structure, a relatively simple burial was found, containing the skeleton of a man along with an offering consisting of several ceramic vessels. Outside the crypt, a small offering was found containing three ceramics: two vessels and a ceramic vase decorated with a hieroglyphic inscription. The finely written hieroglyphic text on the top of the vase indicates that it is a pokol k'ab, a unique name that has only been found on this Maya ceramic, and which has been interpreted as a vase used for washing hands during a ritual ceremony, the text continues indicating that its owner was Telaj K'awiil, a high-ranking person from Uxul. The inscription records it as: "This is the termination of what has been written on the vase to wash the hands of Telaj K'awiil".

=== Uxul mass grave ===
A mass grave of prisoners of war decapitated and dismembered around 1,400 years ago, was discovered in an artificial cave in Uxul, reported in 2013. Their good state of preservation, particularly the bone structure and organic tissues, has allowed researchers to determine that these individuals were violently tortured and executed, as part of a ritual of ceremonial violence that included dismemberment and decapitation. According to anthropological analysis, these captives came from an area near the Usumacinta River in Chiapas and were captured during a war context.

Uxul ceramics

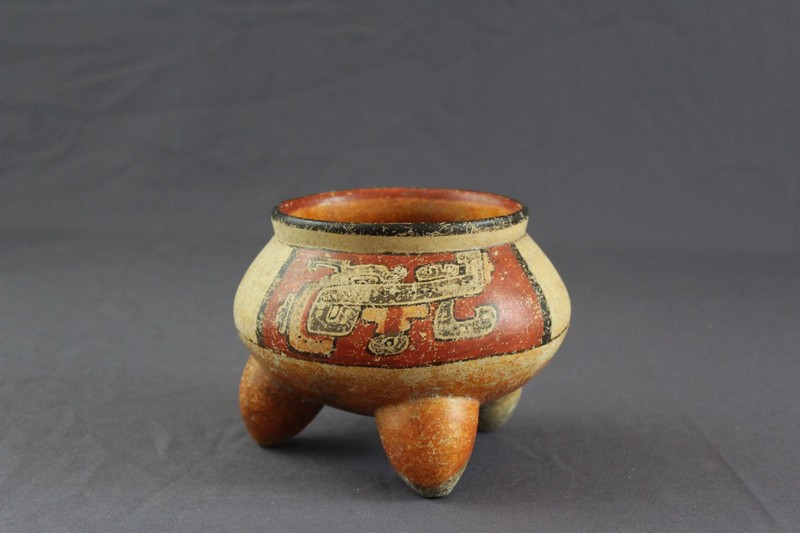
Tetrapod bowl

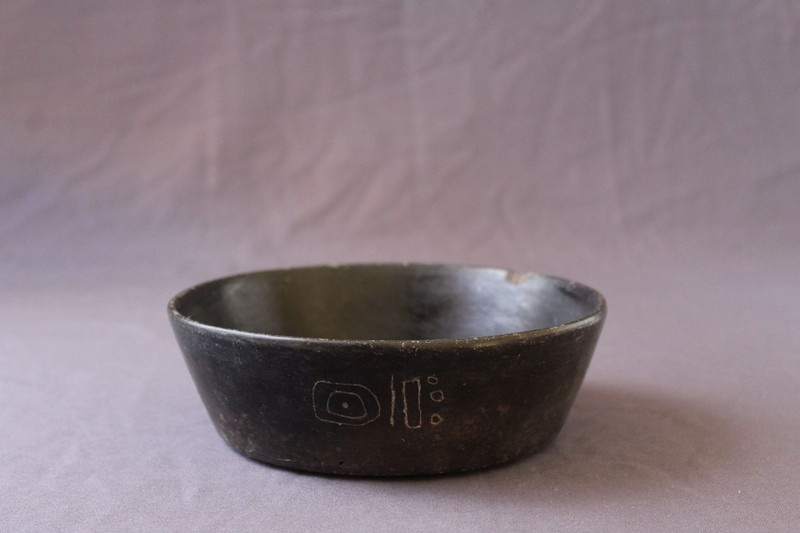
Bowl of the 8 Ajaw

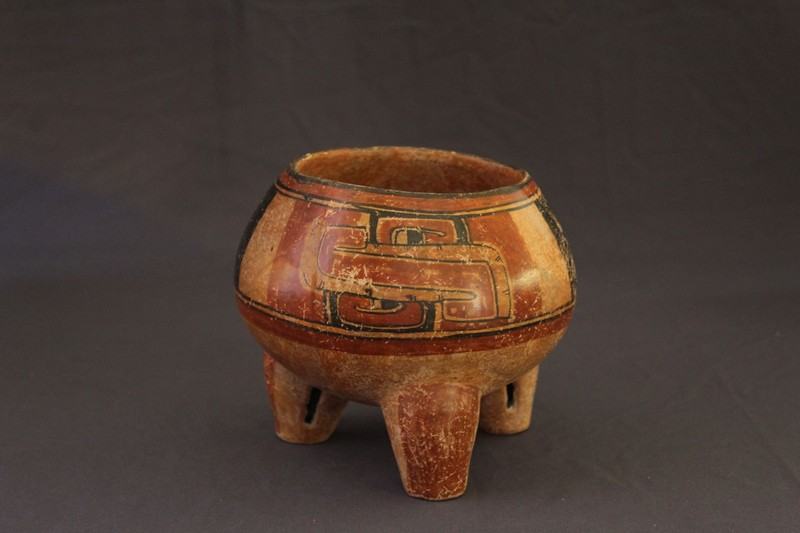
Tripod bowl

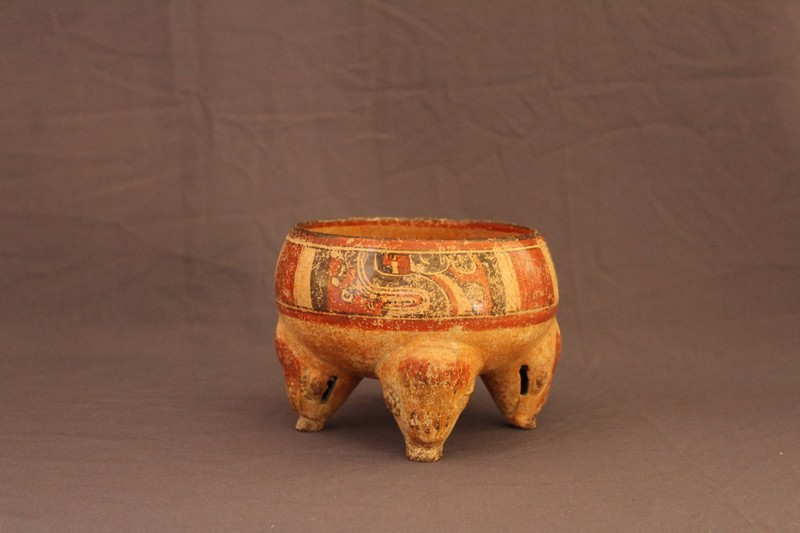
Zoomorphic bowl

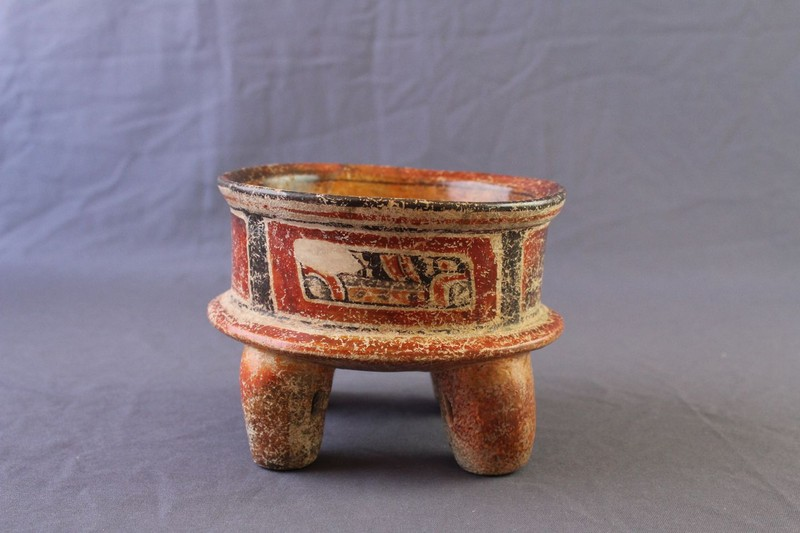
Tetrapod bowl

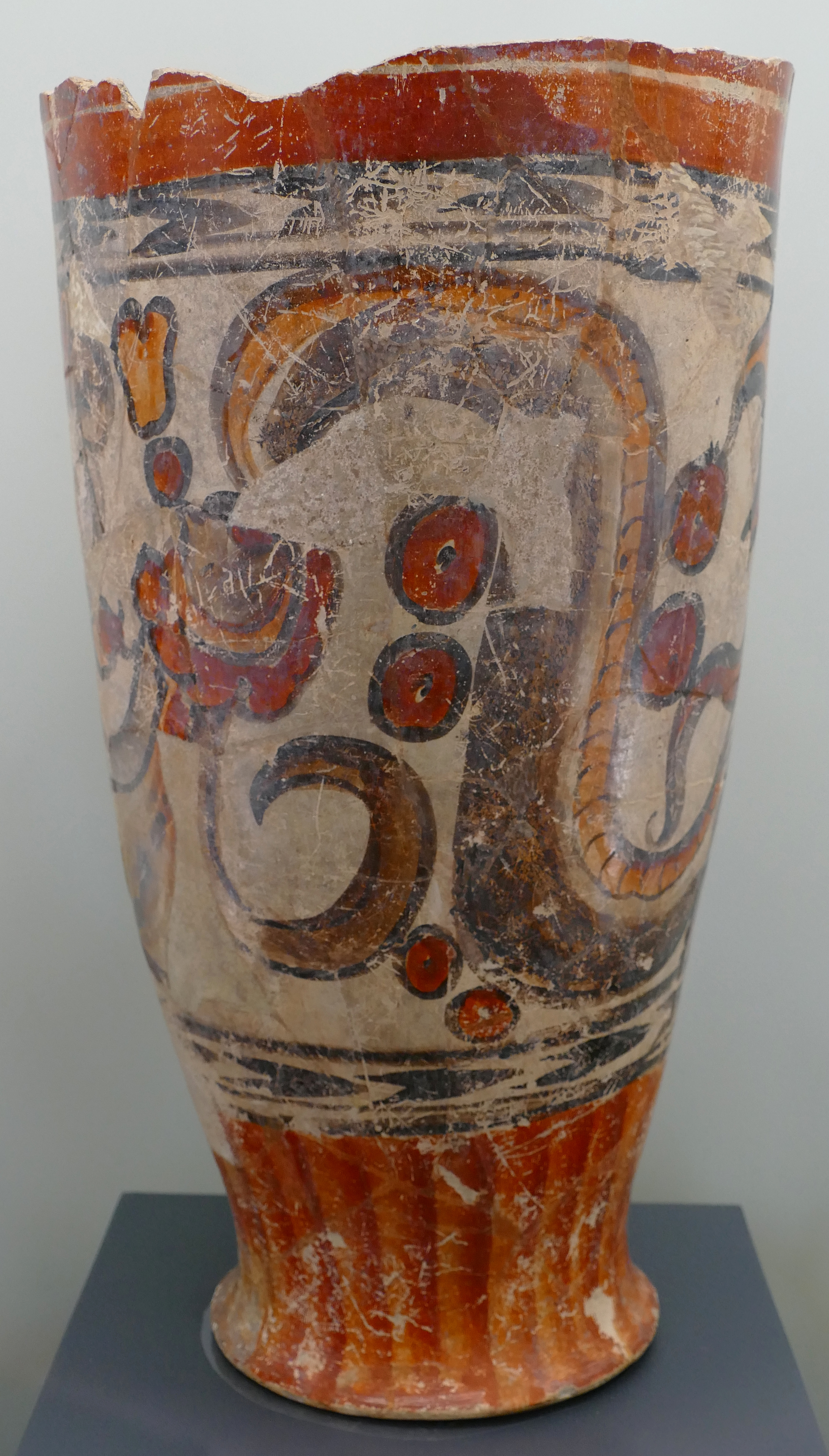
Polychrome drum

== See also ==
- K'àak' Chi'
