= Yoʼokop =

Archaeological site in Mexico

Yoʼokop is an ancient Maya city located in the Cochuah region of central Quintana Roo, Mexico. This area is best known as the center of the Caste War of Yucatán waged during the 19th century, that resulted in an independent Maya state governed from the city of Chan Santa Cruz.

The site was first publicized by the archaeologist Herbert Spinden along with the New York Times journalist Gregory Mason during the 1920s, but intensive scrutiny did not begin until the 21st century. Recent archaeological work at Yoʼokop has revealed that it was a large and significant urban center before the Spanish Conquest. It was continuously inhabited from the Formative Period through the Postclassic Period, as revealed by the presence of datable ceramic sherds and architecture. The name of the site, Yoʼokop refers to a large shallow lake at the southern end of the settlement. (“Yo” is an article and “Okop” means lake. In older scholarship the site is referred to without the article as Okop.)

The grandeur of Yoʼokop can be demonstrated by the fact that the site contains a pyramid (S4W1-1) overgrown with vegetation that is 28 meters tall—only two meters shorter than the celebrated Castillo of Chichen Itza. The site is organized around four groups of architecture made from stone and other enduring materials. These groups are connected with raised roads (sacbeob). The areas between these larger groups contained houses made from perishable materials that are no longer easy to see.

An archaeological project was instigated at Yoʼokop in 2000 under the directorship of Justine Shaw and Dave Johnstone. As of 2009 their team has studied Yoʼokop through mapping, ceramic analysis, and test pits. Their initial data shows how the site was organized, fitted within trade networks, and changed over time. Recognizing the significance of the area, in 2003 they expanded their project into a survey of the broader Cochuah region. One scholar affiliated with the project, Johan Normark, has done research that is notable for its use of theories about material culture and "agency".

Linnea Wren and Travis Nygard have analyzed the monumental record of Yoʼokop in terms of both sacred and "gendered" space. Sculpture at the site includes two freestanding stelae of male rulers and a wall panel of a male ball player—all three of which are rendered in low-relief. The site also includes carefully carved hieroglyphic stair risers describing a queen (Kaloomte Na Chaʼak Kab) who may have ruled at Yoʼokop under the overlord Sky Witness from Calakmul or Dzoyola. The risers were not found in-situ. (For information on Sky Witness, see the work of Simon Martin and Nicolai Grube.)

Prior to Shaw and Johnstone's project the site had been best-studied by Reginald Wilson, who published his findings during the 1970s. A brief visit to the site was also made during the 1950s by the Carnegie Institution of Washington.

== Scholarship ==
- Flores Colin, Alberto G., Dave Johnstone, Justine M. Shaw, Jorge Pablo Huerta Rodríguez, and Johan Normark. "U Chibal Be: A Road of Linage, the Mapping of Yoʼokop's Sacbe 2." In Final Report of the Cochuah Regional Archaeological Survey's 2008 Field Season, edited by Justine M. Shaw, 7-36. Eureka, CA: College of the Redwoods, 2008.
- Johnstone, Dave. "The Ceramic Placement of Yoʼokop: Chronological and Regional Considerations." In Quintana Roo Archaeology, edited by Justine M. Shaw and Jennifer P. Mathews, 158-65. Tucson: University of Arizona Press, 2005.
- Martin, Simon, and Nikolai Grube. Chronicle of the Maya Kings and Queens: Deciphering the Dynasties of the Ancient Maya. Rev. ed. London: Thames & Hudson, 2008.
- Mason, Gregory. Silver Cities of Yucatan. New York: G. P. Putnam's Sons, 1927.
- Normark, Johan. "The Roads in-Between: Causeways and Polyagentive Networks at Ichmul and Yoʼokop, Cochuah Region, Mexico." Doctoral Dissertation, Göteborg University, 2006.
- Nygard, Travis, Kaylee Spencer, and Linnea Wren. "Contemplating Carvings at the Feet of Queen Chaak Kab: Using Mixed Methodology to Understand Sculpture at Yoʼokop." In The Maya of the Cochuah Region: Archaeological and Ethnographic Perspectives on the Northern Lowlands. Edited by Justine Shaw. Albuquerque: University of New Mexico Press, 2015: 57-76.
- Shaw, Justine M. "The Late to Terminal Classic Settlement Shifts at Yoʼokop." In Quintana Roo Archaeology, edited by Justine M. Shaw and Jennifer P. Mathews, 144-57. Tucson: University of Arizona Press, 2005.
- Shaw, Justine M. White Roads of the Yucatán: Changing Social Landscapes of the Yucatec Maya. Tucson: University of Arizona Press, 2008.
- Shaw, Justine M., Sandra Bever, Annie Hanks, Tara Holman, Dave Johnstone, Maya Kashak, Christopher Lloyd, and Veronica Miranda. Final Report of Proyecto Arqueológico Yoʼokop's 2002 Field Season: Excavations and Continued Mapping. Edited by Justine M. Shaw. Eureka, CA: College of the Redwoods, 2002.
- Shaw, Justine M., Dave Johnstone, Maya Kashak, Ruth Krochock, Travis Nygard, and Linnea Wren. Final Report of the Selz Foundation's Proyecto Arqueológico Yoʼokop 2001 Field Season: Excavations and Continued Mapping. Edited by Justine M. Shaw. Eureka, CA: College of the Redwoods, 2001.
- Shaw, Justine M., Dave Johnstone, and Ruth Krochock. Final Report of the 2000 Yoʼokop Field Season: Initial Mapping and Surface Collections. Eureka, CA: College of the Redwoods, 2000.
- Shaw, Justine M., and Jennifer P. Mathews, eds. Quintana Roo Archaeology. Tucson: University of Arizona Press, 2005.
- Strömsvik, G., H. E. D. Pollock, and H. Berlin. "Exploration in Quintana Roo." In Carnegie Institution of Washington Year Book No. 53, July 1, 1953 – June 30, 1954, 289-92. Washington, DC, 1954.
- Wilson, Reginald. "Okop: Antigua Ciudad Maya De Artesanos." INAH Boletín Epoca II, no. 9 (1974): 3-14.
- Wren, Linnea, Travis Nygard, and Justine Shaw. "The Shifting Spatial Nexus of an Urban Maya Landscape: A Case Study of Architecture, Sculpture, and Ceramics at Yoʼokop." In Maya Imagery, Architecture. and Activity: Space and Spatial Analysis in Art History. Albuquerque: University of New Mexico Press, 2015: 306-343.
- Wren, Linnea, and Travis Nygard. "Witnessed at Yoʼokop: Images and Texts of Rulers in a Watery Realm." In Quintana Roo Archaeology, edited by Justine M. Shaw and Jennifer P. Mathews, 166-82. Tucson: University of Arizona Press, 2005.
