= Calakmul =

Ancient Mayan city in Campeche, Mexico

- Kalakmul
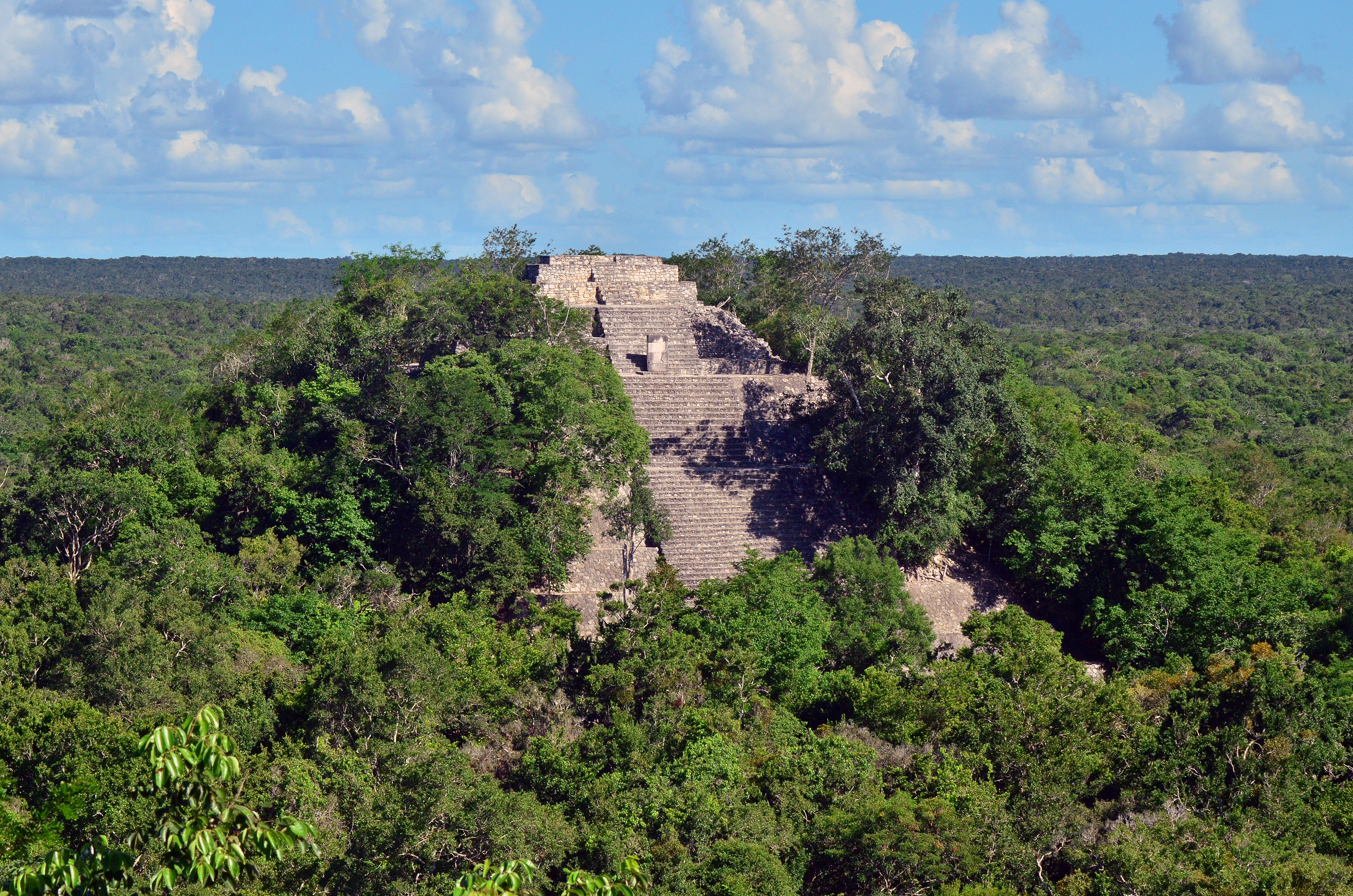
- Temple I, Calakmul Biosphere

- Location of the site Calakmul (Campeche)
- 18°6′19.41″N 89°48′38.98″W
- Periods: Middle Preclassic to Late Classic
- Cultures: Maya civilization
- Location: Calakmul, Campeche, Mexico
- Region: Petén Basin

History
- Built: 400–250 BC
- Abandoned: 10th century

Site notes
- Discovered: 1931

UNESCO World Heritage Site
- Official name: Ancient Maya City and Protected Tropical Forests of Calakmul, Campeche
- Type: Mixed
- Criteria: i, ii, iii, iv, ix, x
- Designated: 2002 (26th session)
- Reference no.: 1061
- Region: Latin America and the Caribbean

Calakmul (/ˌkɑːlɑːkˈmuːl/; also Kalakmul and other less frequent variants) is a Maya archaeological site in the Mexican state of Campeche, deep in the jungles of the greater Petén Basin region. It is 35 kilometres (22 mi) from the Guatemalan border. Calakmul was one of the largest and most powerful Mayan cities.

Calakmul was a major Maya power within the northern Petén Basin region of the Yucatán Peninsula of southern Mexico. Calakmul administered a large domain marked by the extensive distribution of its emblem glyph of the snake head sign, to be read "Kaan". Calakmul was the seat of what has been dubbed the Kingdom of the Snake or Snake Kingdom. This Snake Kingdom reigned during most of the Mesoamerican Classic period. Calakmul is estimated to have had a population of 50,000 people and had governance, at times, over places as far away as 150 kilometers (93 mi). There are 6,750 ancient structures identified at Calakmul, the largest of which is the great pyramid at the site. Structure 2 is over 45 metres (148 ft) high, making it one of the tallest of the Mesoamerican pyramids.

Four tombs have been located within the pyramid. Like many temples and pyramids within Mesoamerica, the pyramid at Calakmul increased in size by sequentially building upon the existing pyramid until it reached its final size. The size of the central monumental architecture is approximately 2 square kilometres (0.77 sq mi) and the whole of the site, mostly covered with dense residential structures, is about 20 square kilometres (7.7 sq mi).

Throughout the Classic period, Calakmul maintained an intense rivalry with the city of Tikal to the south, and the political maneuverings of these two cities have been considered to be a struggle between two Maya superpowers.

Rediscovered from the air by biologist Cyrus L. Lundell of the Mexican Exploitation Chicle Company on December 29, 1931, the find was reported to Sylvanus G. Morley of the Carnegie Institute at Chichen Itza in March 1932.

== Etymology ==
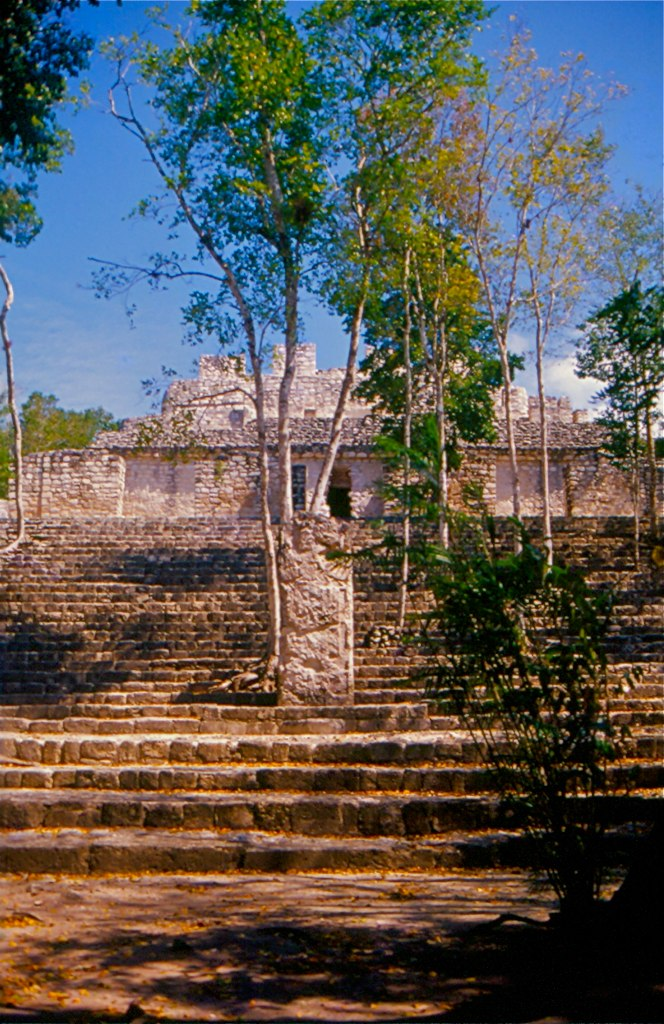
Calakmul's Stela 88 stands upon the stairway of Structure 13

Calakmul is a modern name; according to Cyrus L. Lundell, who named the site, in Maya, ca means "two", lak means "adjacent", and mul signifies any artificial mound or pyramid, so Calakmul is the "City of the Two Adjacent Pyramids". In ancient times the city core was known as Ox Te' Tuun, meaning "Place of Three Stones". Another name associated with the site, and perhaps a larger area around it, is Chiik Naab'. The lords of Calakmul identified themselves as k'uhul kaanal ajaw, Divine Lords of the Snake, but the connection of the title to the actual site is ambiguous.

== Location ==
Calakmul is located in Campeche state in southeastern Mexico, about 35 kilometres (22 mi) north of the border with Guatemala and 38 kilometres (24 mi) north of the ruins of El Mirador. The ruins of El Tintal are 68 kilometres (42 mi) to the southwest of Calakmul and were linked to both El Mirador and Calakmul itself by causeway. Calakmul was about 20 kilometres (12 mi) south of the contemporary city of Oxpemul and approximately 25 kilometres (16 mi) southwest of La Muñeca.

The city is located on a rise about 35 metres (115 ft) above a large seasonal swamp lying to the west, known as the El Laberinto bajo (a Spanish word used in the region to denote a low-lying area of seasonal marshland). This swamp measures approximately 34 by 8 kilometres (21.1 by 5.0 mi) and was an important source of water during the rainy season. The bajo was linked to a sophisticated water-control system including both natural and artificial features such as gullies and canals that encircled a 22-square-kilometre (8.5 sq mi) area around the site core, an area considered as Inner Calakmul. The location of Calakmul at the edge of a bajo provided two additional advantages: the fertile soils along the edge of the swamp and access to abundant flint nodules. The city is situated on a promontory formed by a natural 35-metre (115 ft) high limestone dome rising above the surrounding lowlands. This dome was artificially levelled by the Maya. During the Preclassic and Classic periods settlement was concentrated along the edge of the El Laberinto bajo, during the Classic period structures were also built on high ground and small islands in the swamp where flint was worked.

At the beginning of the 21st century the area around Calakmul remained covered by dense forest. During the 1st millennium AD the area received moderate and regular rainfall, although there is less surface water available than further south in Guatemala. Calakumul is now located within the 1,800,000-acre (7,300 km^{2}) Calakmul Biosphere Reserve. The area conserved within the Reserve was conceptualized by the Centro de Investigaciones Historicas y Sociales de Universidad Autónoma de Campeche (CIHS/UAC).

== Population and extent ==
At its height in the Late Classic period the city is estimated to have had a population of 50,000 inhabitants and to have covered an area of over 70 square kilometres (27 sq mi). The city was the capital of a large regional state with an area of about 13,000 square kilometres (5,000 sq mi). During the Terminal Classic the city's population declined dramatically and the rural population plummeted to 10% of its former level.

The Late Classic population density of Calakmul has been calculated at 1000/km^{2} (2564 per square mile) in the site core and 420/km^{2} (1076 per square mile) in the periphery (an area of 122 square kilometres (47 sq mi). Calakmul was a true urban city and not just an elite centre surrounded by commoner residences. The site core of Calakmul was known in ancient times as Ox Te' Tuun ("Three Stones") which may have been because of the triadic pyramid Structure 2.

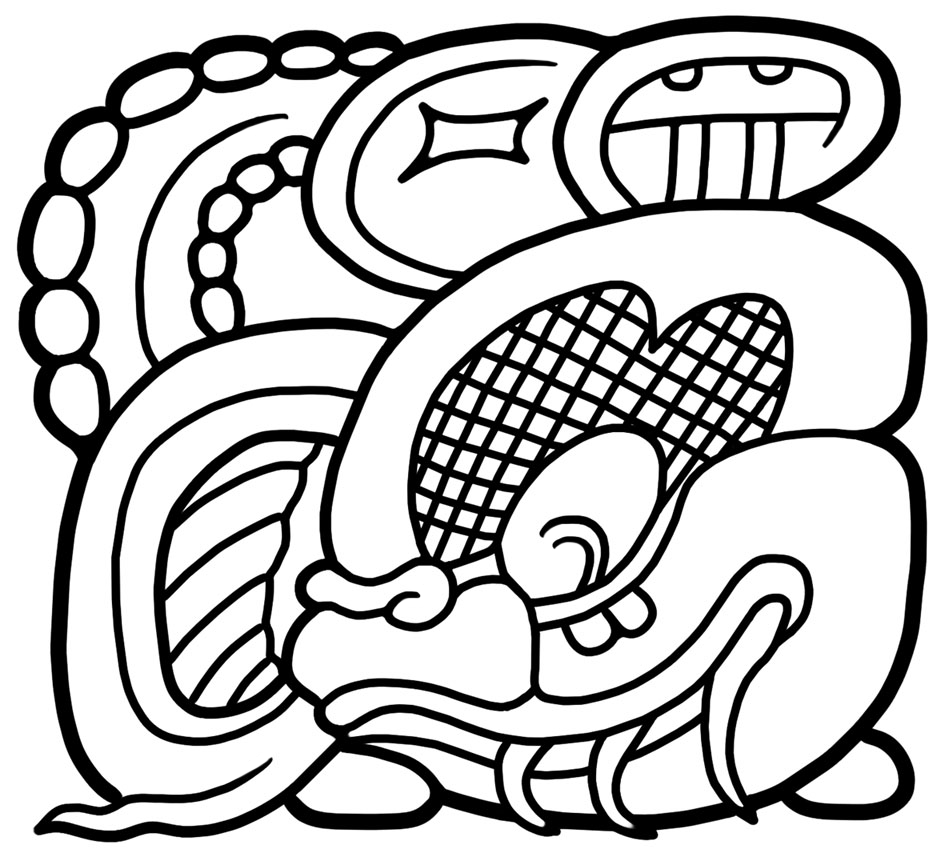
The Emblem Glyph of the Kanul dynasty at Calakmul

The Calakmul kingdom included 20 secondary centres, among which were large cities such as La Muñeca, Naachtun, Sasilha, Oxpemul and Uxul. The total population of these secondary centres has been estimated at 200,000. The kingdom also included a large number of tertiary and quaternary sites, mostly fairly small and consisting of a number of groups arranged around courtyards, although there are also larger rural sites situated on ridges along the edges of the bajos that include temples, palaces and stelae. The total rural population of the kingdom is calculated at 1.5 million people. The entire population of the Calakmul kingdom, including the city itself and the rural population in the 13,000 square kilometres (5,000 sq mi) area of the regional state, is calculated at 1.75 million people in the Late Classic period.

The Emblem Glyph of Calakmul has a greater distribution than the Emblem Glyph of any other Maya city. The Glyph is also found in more hieroglyphic texts than any other Emblem Glyph, including that of Tikal. Calakmul administered a large domain marked by the extensive distribution of their emblem glyph of the snake head sign, to be read "Kaan". Calakmul was the seat of what has been dubbed the Snake Kingdom. At times the city had governance over places as far away as 150 kilometers.

== Known rulers ==
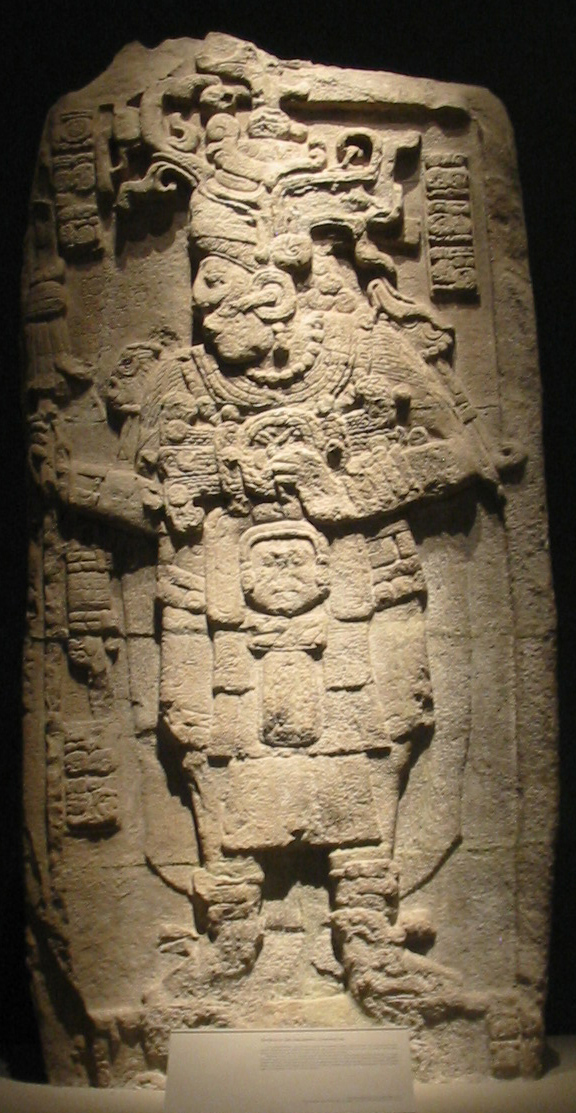
Stela 51, dated to AD 731, depicts Yuknoom Took' K'awiil.

== Emblem Glyph ==
At Calakmul's peak in the 7th century, the polity was known as Kaan. The Preclassic political state in the Mirador Basin also used the title Kaan. There is the idea that, after the collapse of the Mirador state, its refugees migrated north towards Calakmul, where they founded a new Kaan polity. However, epigraphical studies of the monuments at Calakmul show that prior to the 7th century AD the emblem glyph of Calakmul had nothing to do with a snake, but with a bat. It seems that a different polity ruled there. The Kaan emblem glyph, before being associated with Calakmul, is found (once) at Dzibanché, a site more towards the east. Perhaps during the late 6th/early 7th century, the polity at Dzibanché moved to Calakmul in order to establish a more strategically placed capital. After Calakmul's power dwindled in the 8th century, after the rule of Yuknoom Took K'awiil, it appears that the bat emblem glyph made its resurgence. Still, many uncertainties remain and new epigraphical studies have to be done to fill the gaps.

== History ==
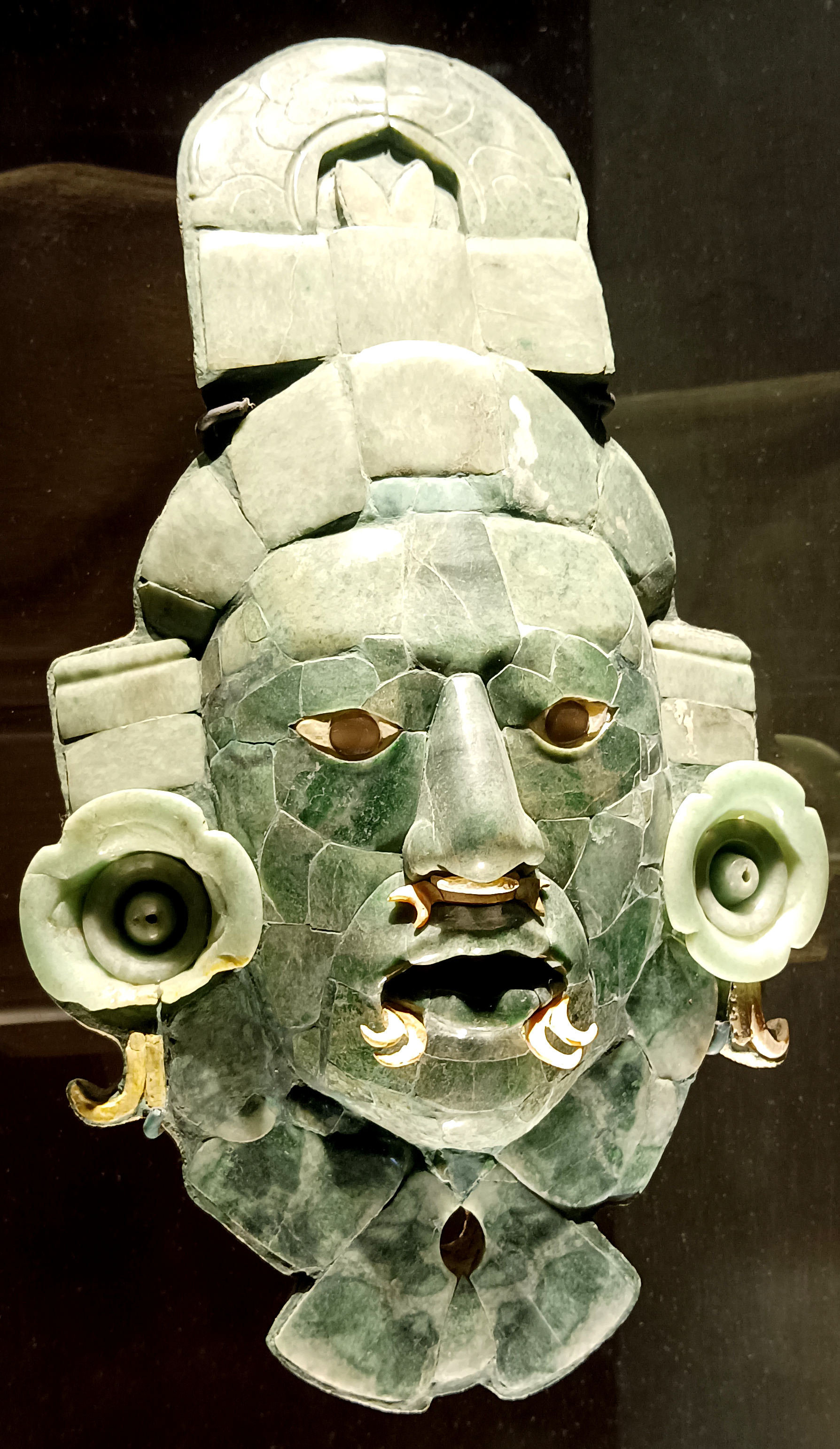
Jade mask, currently exhibited at the Museum of Maya Architecture

Calakmul has a long occupational history and excavations have revealed evidence from the Middle Preclassic right through to the Postclassic. The causeway network that linked Calakmul with the cities of El Mirador, Nakbe and El Tintal suggest strong political links between the four cities that may have begun in the Preclassic, when both Calakmul and El Mirador were important cities, and continued into the Classic period when Calakmul itself was the most powerful city in the region. Calakmul was one of the largest and most powerful ancient cities ever uncovered in the Maya lowlands.

=== Calakmul vs. Tikal ===
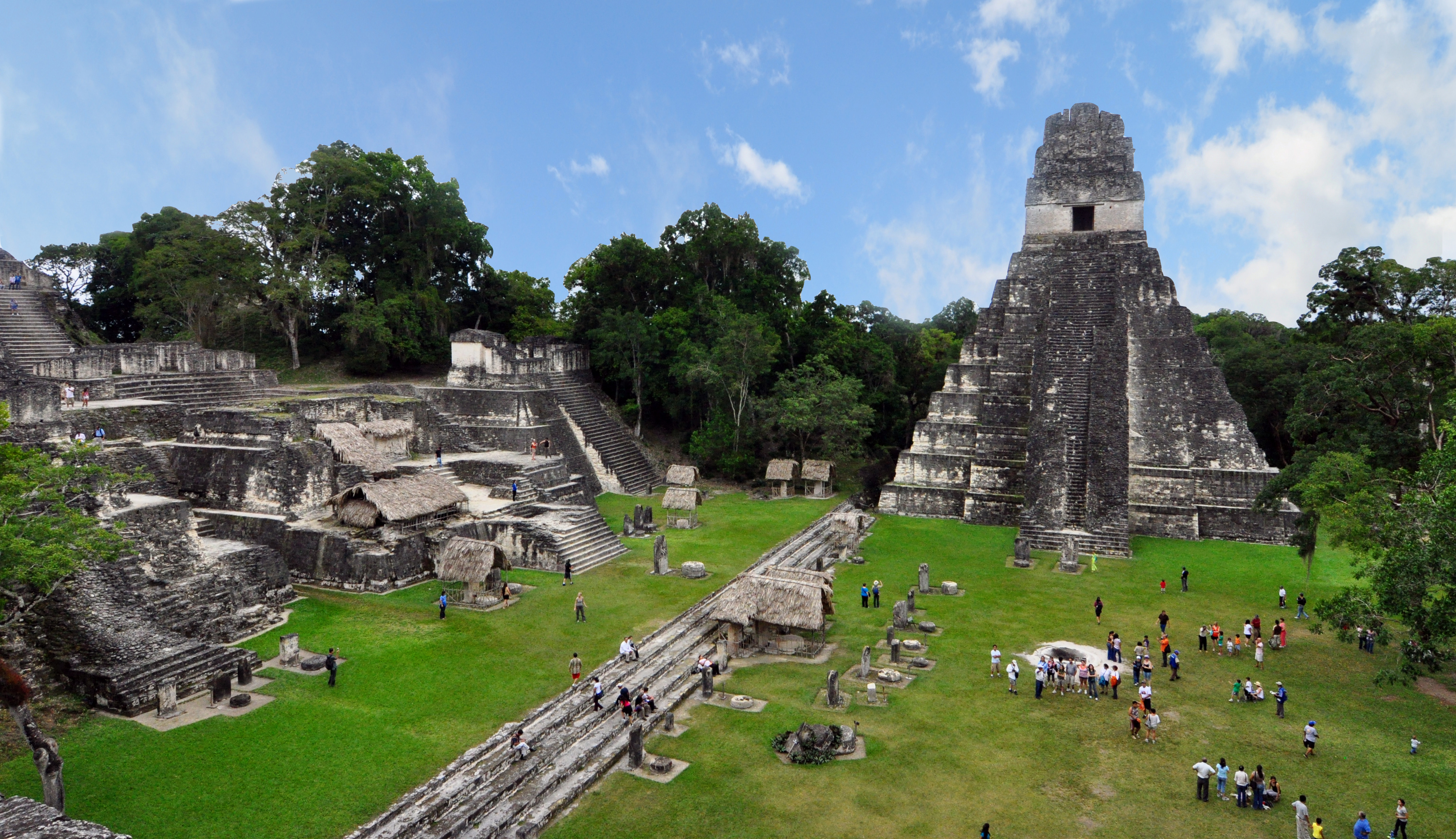
The history of Classic Maya civilization was dominated by the rivalry between the opposed alliance networks of Calakmul and Tikal (pictured)

The history of the Maya Classic period is dominated by the rivalry between Tikal and Calakmul, likened to a struggle between two Maya "superpowers". Earlier times tended to be dominated by a single larger city and by the Early Classic Tikal was moving into this position after the dominance of El Mirador in the Late Preclassic and Nakbe in the Middle Preclassic. However Calakmul was a rival city with equivalent resources that challenged the supremacy of Tikal and engaged in a strategy of surrounding it with its own network of allies. From the second half of the 6th century AD through to the late 7th century Calakmul gained the upper hand although it failed to extinguish Tikal's power completely and Tikal was able to turn the tables on its great rival in a decisive battle that took place in AD 695. Half a century later Tikal was able to gain major victories over Calakmul's most important allies. Eventually both cities succumbed to the spreading Classic Maya collapse.

The great rivalry between these two cities may have been based on more than competition for resources. Their dynastic histories reveal different origins and the intense competition between the two powers may have had an ideological grounding. Calakmul's dynasty seems ultimately derived from the great Preclassic city of El Mirador while the dynasty of Tikal was profoundly affected by the intervention of the distant central Mexican metropolis of Teotihuacan. With few exceptions, Tikal's monuments and those of its allies place great emphasis upon single male rulers while the monuments of Calakmul and its allies gave greater prominence to the female line and often the joint rule of king and queen.

=== Preclassic ===
Calakmul was already a large city in the Preclassic period. The early history of Calakmul is obscure, although a dynastic list has been pieced together that extends back into an ancestral past. This dynasty has been reconstructed in part from Late Classic ceramics from the region of great Preclassic cities of El Mirador and Nakbe. This may mean that Calakmul ultimately inherited its political authority from one of these cities, with its dynasty originating in the Late Preclassic in the Mirador Basin and relocating itself to Calakmul in the Classic period after the collapse of these cities.

=== Early Classic ===
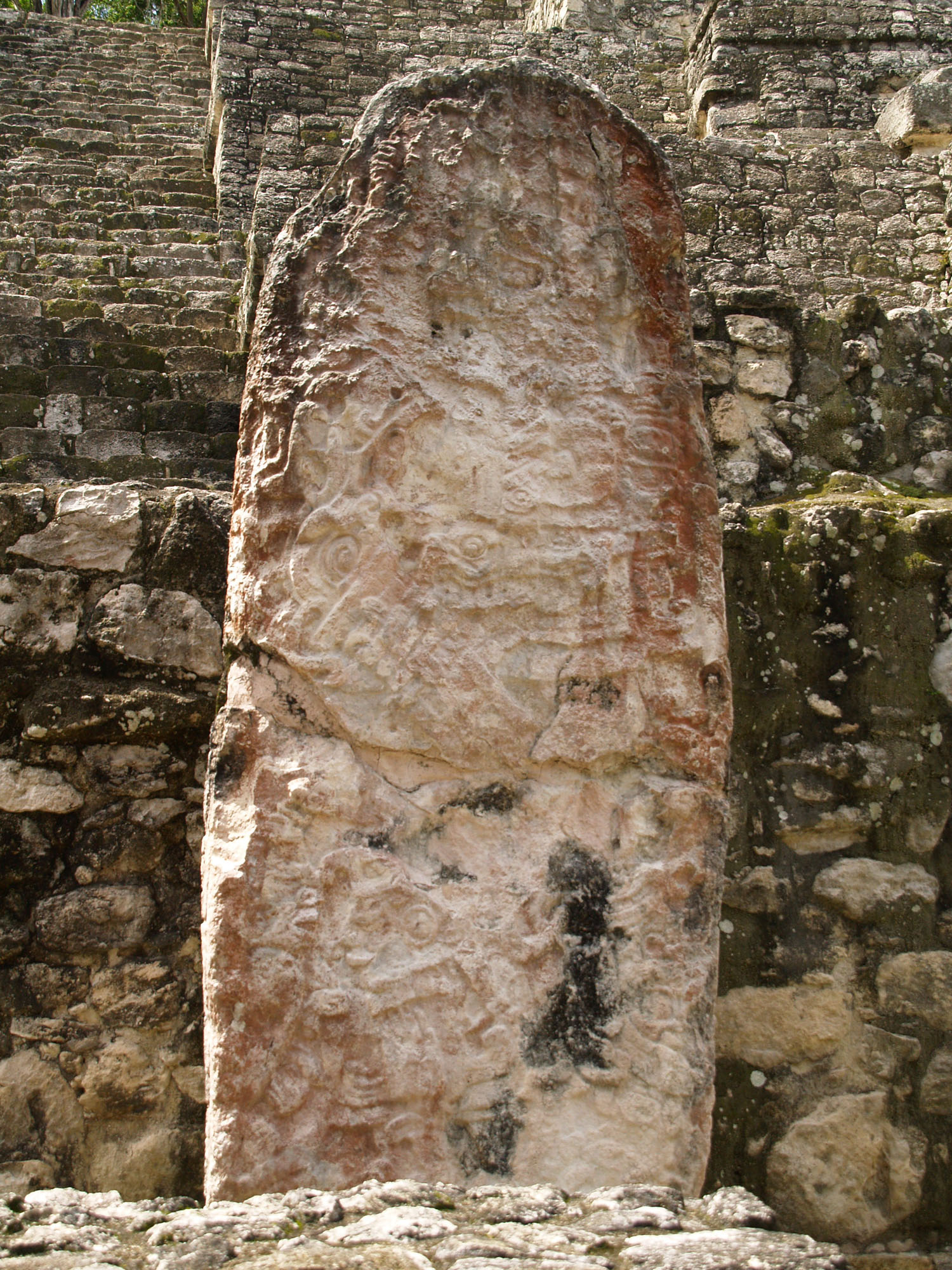
Stela 43 dates to AD 514, in the Early Classic period.

Both Calakmul and Tikal were sizeable Preclassic cities that survived into the Classic Period. Early hieroglyphic texts from stelae found in Structure 2 record the probable enthronement of a king of Calakmul in AD 411 and also records a non-royal site ruler in 514. After this there is a gap in the hieroglyphic records that lasts over a century, although the Kaan dynasty experienced a major expansion of its power at this time. The lack of inscriptions recording the events of this period may be either due to the fact that the Kaan dynasty was located elsewhere during this time or perhaps that the monuments were later destroyed.

The earliest legible texts referring to the kings of the Kaan dynasty come from excavations of the large city of Dzibanche in Quintana Roo, far north of Calakmul. A hieroglyphic stairway depicts bound captives, their names and the dates they were captured together with the name of king Yuknoom Che'en I, although the exact context of the king's name is unclear - the captives may have been his vassals captured by an enemy or they may have been rulers captured by the king of Calakmul. The dates are uncertain but two of them may fall within the 5th century AD. The nearby Quintana Roo site of El Resbalón has a jumbled hieroglyphic text, including a date in 529, that indicates that the city was within the control of the Kaan dynasty.

By the middle of the 6th century AD Calakmul was assembling a far-reaching political alliance, activity that brought the city into conflict with the great city of Tikal. The influence of Calakmul extended deep into the Petén; king Tuun K'ab' Hix of Calakmul oversaw the enthronement of Aj Wosal to the rulership of Naranjo in 546. Another vassal of Tuun K'ab' Hix was taken captive by Yaxchilan on the banks of the Usumacinta River in 537.

In 561, the king now known as Sky Witness installed a ruler at the site of Los Alacranes. Sky Witness played a major part in the political events of the Maya region. He became the overlord of the city of Caracol, to the south of Naranjo, which had previously been a vassal of Tikal. In 562, according to a damaged text at Caracol, Sky Witness defeated Tikal itself and sacrificed its king Wak Chan K'awiil, thus ending his branch of the royal dynasty at Tikal. This catastrophic defeat began a 130-year hiatus for Tikal, reflecting an extended period of dominance by Calakmul. This event is used as a marker to divide the Early Classic from the Late Classic. Sky Witness is also mentioned at Okop, a site much further north in Quintana Roo. The last reference to Sky Witness occurs at Caracol and is dated to AD 572. The text is damaged but probably records the death of this powerful king.

=== Late Classic ===
==== War with Palenque ====
Sky Witness was quickly succeeded by First Axewielder, who is mentioned in a text from Dzibanche celebrating the K'atun-ending of 573. First Axewielder ruled for about six years. In 579 Uneh Chan became king of Calakmul. Uneh Chan engaged in an aggressive campaign in the western Maya region and attacked Palenque on 23 April 599 with his ally Lakam Chak, lord of the small city of Santa Elena 70 kilometres (43 mi) east of Palenque, defeating Palenque's queen Lady Yohl Ik'nal and sacking the city. The defeat is recorded on a series of hieroglyphic steps at Palenque itself and the event initiated a long-lasting grudge against Calakmul. Lady Yohl Ik'nal survived the battle and ruled for several more years, although she perhaps paid tribute to Calakmul.

Uneh Chan maintained his alliances with cities in the east and he is depicted on Caracol Stela 4 supervising an event involving king Yajaw Te' K'inich of that city that occurred before 583. Calakmul again sacked Palenque on 7 April 611 under the personal direction of Uneh Chan. Palenque was now ruled by king Ajen Yohl Mat who had gained some sort of independence from Calakmul, provoking the new invasion. The immediate aftermath of this second victory over Palenque involved the deaths of the two most important nobles at the city, Ajen Yohl Mat himself and Janab Pakal, a high-ranking member of the royal family and possibly co-ruler. Janab Pakal died in March 612 and Ajen Yohl Mat a few months later. Their deaths so soon after the sacking of the city suggests that their demise was directly linked to Calakmul's triumph. Palenque suffered a lengthy decline in its fortunes after this date before it was able to recover from its disastrous war with Calakmul. The wars against Palenque may have been undertaken by Uneh Chan in order to seize control of wealthy trade routes that passed through the western Maya region.

==== Rebellion at Naranjo ====
King Yuknoom Chan of Calakmul supervised an event at Caracol in 619. Caracol Stela 22 records the accession of Tajoom Uk'ab' K'ak' to the Calakmul throne in 622. Two stelae were erected at Calakmul in 623 but their texts are too badly damaged to reveal the names of the royal couple involved. Approximately at this time Naranjo, a vassal of Calakmul, broke away when its king Aj Wosal died relatively soon after the death of Uneh Chan of Calakmul. Naranjo was independent of Calakmul by at least AD 626, when it was twice defeated by Caracol and Yuknoom Chan may have been attempting to bring Naranjo back under Calakmul control. His attempts were brought to an end by his death in 630. In 631 Yuknoom Head, the new king of Calakmul, finally regained control of Naranjo. Texts relate that the king of Naranjo was already captive at Calakmul on the day that his city was overrun and his punishment on the very same day is described by the word k'uxaj (/k’uːˈʃäχ/) meaning either "tortured" or "eaten". Yuknoom Head conquered another city in March 636, although the exact site is unknown.

==== Apogee ====
The Kaan dynasty was not originally established at Calakmul but rather re-located there in the 7th century from another city. Calakmul experienced its highest achievements during the reign of king Yuknoom Che'en II, sometimes called Yuknoom the Great by scholars. Yuknoom Che'en II was 36 years old when he came to the throne of Calakmul in AD 636. A significant increase in the production of stelae at the city began with his reign and 18 stelae were commissioned by the king. Yuknoom Che'en II was probably responsible for the construction of the palace complexes that form a major part of the site core.

===== Calakmul and Dos Pilas =====
In 629 Tikal had founded Dos Pilas in the Petexbatún region, some 110 kilometres (68 mi) to its southwest, as a military outpost in order to control trade along the course of the Pasión River. B'alaj Chan K'awiil was installed on the throne of the new outpost at the age of four, in 635, and for many years served as a loyal vassal fighting for his brother, the king of Tikal. In AD 648 Calakmul attacked Dos Pilas and gained an overwhelming victory that included the death of a Tikal lord. B'alaj Chan K'awiil was captured by Yuknoom Che'en II but, instead of being sacrificed, he was re-instated on his throne as a vassal of the Calakmul king, and went on to attack Tikal in 657, forcing Nuun Ujol Chaak, the then king of Tikal, to temporarily abandon the city. The first two rulers of Dos Pilas continued to use the Mutal emblem glyph of Tikal, and they probably felt that they had a legitimate claim to the throne of Tikal itself. For some reason, B'alaj Chan K'awiil was not installed as the new ruler of Tikal; instead he stayed at Dos Pilas.

Tikal counterattacked against Dos Pilas in 672, driving B'alaj Chan K'awiil into an exile that lasted five years. Calakmul tried to encircle Tikal within an area dominated by its allies, such as El Peru, Dos Pilas and Caracol. In 677 Calakmul counterattacked against Dos Pilas, driving Tikal out and reinstalled B'alaj Chan K'awiil on his throne. In 679 Dos Pilas, probably aided by Calakmul, gained an important victory over Tikal, with a hieroglyphic description of the battle describing pools of blood and piles of heads.

Troubles continued in the east, with renewed conflict between Naranjo and Caracol. Naranjo completely defeated Caracol in 680 but Naranjo's dynasty disappeared within two years and a daughter of B'alaj Chan K'awiil founded a new dynasty there in 682, indicating that Calakmul had probably intervened decisively to place a loyal vassal on the throne. The patronage of Yuknoom Che'en II as overlord is recorded at a range of important cities, including El Peru where he oversaw the installation of K'inich B'alam as king and strengthened the tie with the marriage of a Calakmul princess to that king. The power of Calakmul extended as far as the north shore of Lake Petén Itzá, where Motul de San José is recorded as its vassal in the 7th century, although it was traditionally aligned with Tikal. Yuknoom Che'en II commanded the loyalty of three generations of kings at Cancuen, 245 kilometres (152 mi) to the south, and supervised the enthronement of at least two of them, in 656 and 677. King Yuknoom Che'en II was involved, directly or indirectly, in the crowning of a king at Moral to the west in Tabasco and one of Yuknoom's nobles supervised a ritual at Piedras Negras on the Guatemalan bank of the Usumacinta River. Yuknoom Che'en II died in his eighties, probably at the beginning of 686. When he died, Calakmul was the most powerful city in the central Maya lowlands.

Yuknoom Yich'aak K'ak' succeeded Yuknoom Che'en II, his crowning on 3 April 686 was recorded on monuments at Dos Pilas and El Peru. He was born in 649 and was likely to have been the son of his predecessor. He already held high office before he was named king and may have been responsible for the major successes of the latter part of Yuknoom Che'en II's reign. He retained the loyalty of K'inich B'alam of El Peru and B'alaj Chan K'awiil of Dos Pilas and gained that of K'ak' Tiliw Chan Chaak in 693, when he was installed on the throne of Naranjo at the age of five. However, the texts on sculpted monuments do not reveal the full complexity of diplomatic activity, as revealed by a painted ceramic vase from Tikal, which depicts an ambassador of Calakmul's king kneeling before the enthroned king of Tikal and delivering tribute. Just four years later, in August 695, the two states were once again at war. Yuknoom Yich'aak K'ak' led his warriors against Jasaw Chan K'awiil I in a catastrophic battle that saw the defeat of Calakmul and the capture of the image of a Calakmul deity named Yajaw Maan. It is unknown what happened to Yuknoom Yich'aak K'ak'; a stucco sculpture from Tikal shows a captive and the king is mentioned in the accompanying caption but it is not certain if the captive and the king are the same person. This event marked the end of Calakmul's apogee, with diplomatic activity dropping away and fewer cities recognising Calakmul's king as overlord. No stelae remain standing in the site core recording Yuknoom Yich'aal K'ak, although there are some in the Northeast Group and 2 broken stelae were buried in Structure 2.

==== Later kings ====
The next ruler of Calakmul, Split Earth, is mentioned on a pair of carved bones in the tomb of Tikal king Jasaw Chan K'awiil I. He was ruling by November 695 but it is not known if he was a legitimate member of the Calakmul dynasty or whether he was a pretender placed on the throne by Tikal.

The next known king used a number of name variants, and is referred to by different name segments within and outside of Calakmul. A partial reading of his name is Yuknoom Took' K'awiil. He erected seven stelae to celebrate a calendrical event in 702 and is named at Dos Pilas in that year, presumably demonstrating that Dos Pilas was still a vassal of Calakmul. El Peru also continued as a vassal and Yuknoom Took' K'awiil installed a new king there at an unknown date. La Corona received a queen from Yuknoom Took'. Naranjo also remained loyal. Yuknoom Took' K'awiil commissioned seven more stelae to mark the k'atun-ending of 731. A new defeat at the hands of Tikal is evidenced by a sculpted altar at that city, probably dating to sometime between 733 and 736, depicting a bound lord from Calakmul and possibly names Yuknoom Took' K'awiil.

===== Calakmul and Quiriguá =====
After this the historical record of Calakmul becomes very vague, due both to the poor state of the heavily eroded monuments at the city itself and also its reduced political presence on the wider Maya stage. Wamaw K'awiil is named at Quiriguá on the southern periphery of Mesoamerica. Quiriguá traditionally had been a vassal of its southern neighbour Copán, and in 724 Uaxaclajuun Ub'aah K'awiil, king of Copán, installed K'ak' Tiliw Chan Yopaat upon Quiriguá's throne as his vassal. By 734 K'ak' Tiliw Chan Yopaat had shown that he was no longer an obedient subordinate of Copán when he started to refer to himself as k'ul ahaw, holy lord, instead of using the lesser term ahaw, subordinate lord; at the same time he began to use his own Quiriguá emblem glyph.

This local act of rebellion appears to have been part of the larger political struggle between Tikal and Calakmul. In 736, only two years later, K'ak' Tiliw Chan Yopaat received a visit from Wamaw K'awiil of Calakmul, while Copán was one of Tikal's oldest allies. The timing of this visit by the king of Calakmul is highly significant, falling between the accession of K'ak' Tiliw Chan Yopaat to the throne of Quiriguá as a vassal of Copán and the outright rebellion that was to follow. This strongly suggests that Calakmul sponsored Quiriguá's rebellion in order to weaken Tikal and to gain access to the rich trade route of the Motagua Valley. It is likely that contact with Calakmul had been initiated soon after K'ak' Tiliw Chan Yopaat acceded to the throne.

In 738 K'ak' Tiliw Chan Yopaat captured the powerful but elderly king of Copán, Uaxaclajuun Ub'aah K'awiil. An inscription at Quiriguá, although difficult to interpret, suggests that the capture took place on 27 April 738, when Quiriguá seized and burned the wooden images of Copán's patron deities. The captured lord was taken back to Quiriguá and on 3 May 738 he was decapitated in a public ritual.

In the Late Classic, alliance with Calakmul was frequently associated with the promise of military support. The fact that Copán, a much more powerful city than Quiriguá, failed to retaliate against its former vassal implies that it feared the military intervention of Calakmul. Calakmul itself was far enough away from Quiriguá that K'ak' Tiliw Chan Yopaat was not afraid of falling directly under its power as a full vassal state, even though it is likely that Calakmul sent warriors to help in the defeat of Copán. The alliance instead seems to have been one of mutual advantage: Calakmul managed to weaken a powerful ally of Tikal while Quiriguá gained its independence.

==== Collapse ====
Five large stelae were raised in 741, although the name of the king responsible is illegible on all of them and he has been labelled as Ruler Y. Calakmul's presence in the wider Maya area continued to wane, with two of the city's major allies suffering defeats at the hands of Tikal. El Peru was defeated in 743 and Naranjo a year later and this resulted in the final collapse of Calakmul's once powerful alliance network, while Tikal underwent a resurgence in its power.

In 751 Ruler Z erected a stela that was never finished, paired with another with the portrait of a queen. A hieroglyphic stairway mentions someone called B'olon K'awiil at about the same time. B'olon K'awiil was king by 771 when he raised two stelae and he was mentioned at Toniná in 789. Sites to the north of Calakmul showed a reduction in its influence at this time, with new architectural styles influenced by sites further north in the Yucatán Peninsula.

A monument was raised in 790 although the name of the ruler responsible is not preserved. Two more were raised in 800 and three in 810. No monument was erected to commemorate the important Bak'tun-ending of 830 and it is probable that political authority had already collapsed at this time. Important cities such as Oxpemul, Nadzca'an and La Muñeca that were Calakmul's vassals at one time now erected their own monuments, where before they had raised very few; some continued producing new monuments until as late as 889. This was a process that paralleled events at Tikal. However, there is strong evidence of an elite presence at the city continuing until AD 900, possibly even later.

In 849, Calakmul was mentioned at Seibal where a ruler named as Chan Pet attended the K'atun-ending ceremony; his name may also be recorded on a broken ceramic at Calakmul itself. However, it is unlikely that Calakmul still existed as a state in any meaningful way at this late date. A final flurry of activity took place at the end of the 9th century or the beginning of the 10th. A new stela was erected, although the date records only the day, not the full date. The recorded day may fall either in 899 or 909 with the latter date the most likely. A few monuments appear to be even later although their style is crude, representing the efforts of a remnant population to maintain the Classic Maya tradition. Even the inscriptions on these late monuments are meaningless imitations of writing.

Ceramics dating to the Terminal Classic period are uncommon outside of the site core, suggesting that the population of the city was concentrated in the city centre in the final phase of Calakmul's occupation. The majority of the surviving population probably consisted of commoners who had occupied the elite architecture of the site core but the continued erection of stelae into the early 10th century and the presence of high status imported goods such as metal, obsidian, jade and shell, indicate a continued occupation by royalty until the final abandonment of the city. The Yucatec-speaking Kejache Maya who lived in the region at the time of Spanish contact in the early 16th century may have been the descendants of the inhabitants of Calakmul.

=== Modern history ===
Calakmul was first reported by Cyrus Lundell in 1931. A year later he informed Sylvanus Morley of the site's existence and the presence of more than 60 stelae. Morley visited the ruins himself on behalf of the Carnegie Institution of Washington in 1932. In the 1930s surveys mapped the site core and recorded 103 stelae. Investigations stopped in 1938 and archaeologists did not return to the site until 1982 when William J. Folan directed a project on behalf of the Universidad Autónoma de Campeche, working at Calakmul until 1994. Calakmul is now the subject of a large-scale project of the National Institute of Anthropology and History (INAH) under the direction of Ramón Carrasco.

== Site description ==
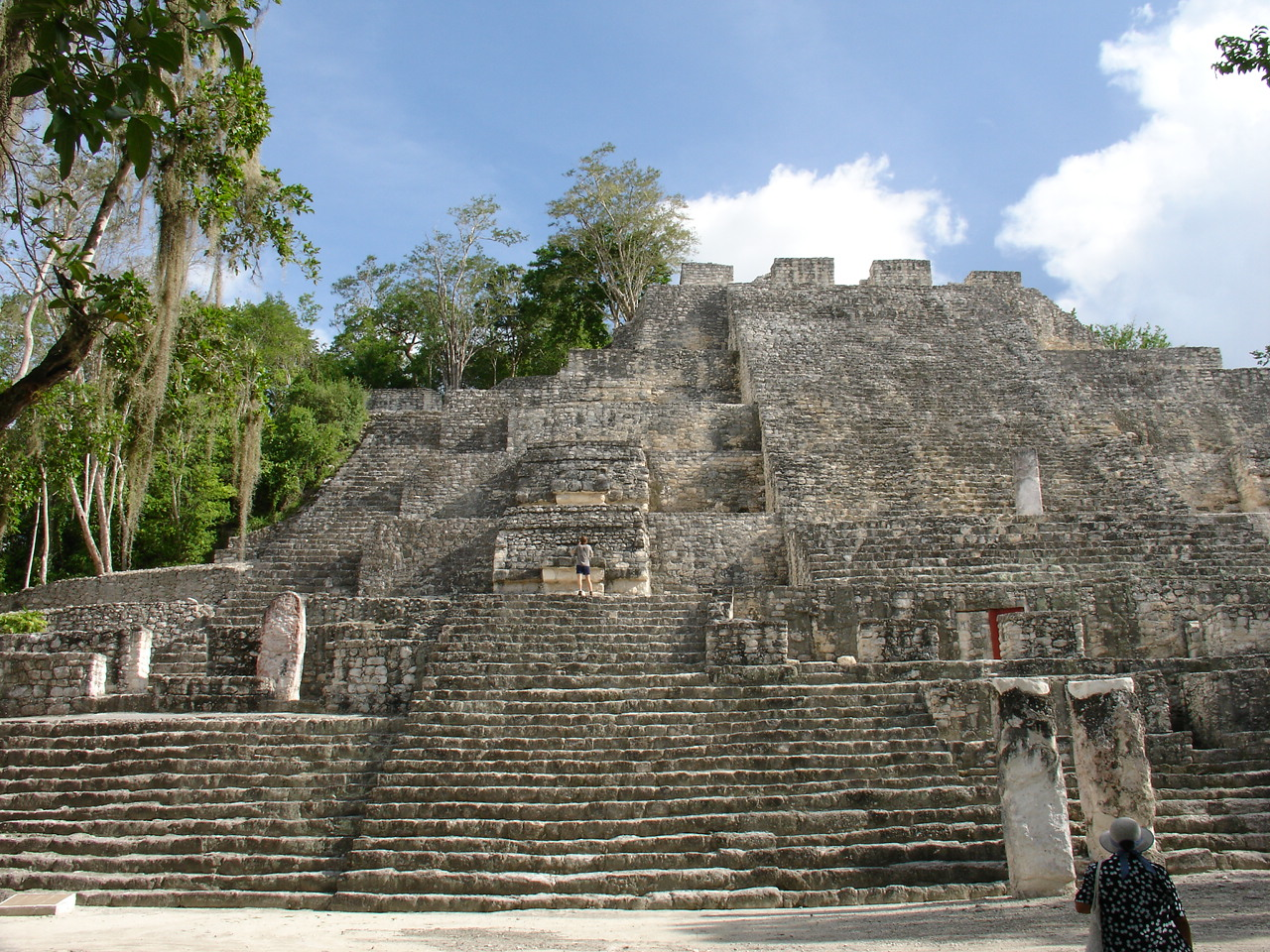
Structure 2 at Calakmul, one of the most massive structures in the Maya world, was originally built in the Preclassic and continued in use through to the Late Classic.

The site core of Calakmul covers an area of approximately 2 square kilometres (0.77 sq mi), an area that contains the remains of roughly 1000 structures. The periphery occupied by smaller residential structures beyond the site core covers an area of more than 20 square kilometres (7.7 sq mi) within which archaeologists have mapped approximately 6250 structures. Calakmul matches the great city of Tikal in size and estimated population, although the density of the city appears to have been greater than that city.

The stone used in construction at the site is a soft limestone. This has resulted in severe erosion of the site's sculpture. The city of Calakmul was built in a strongly concentric fashion and can be divided into zones as one moves outwards from the centre of the site. The innermost zone covers an area of approximately 1.75 square kilometres (0.68 sq mi) It contains most of the monumental architecture and has 975 mapped structures, about 300 of which are built from vaulted stone masonry. About 92 structures were built on large pyramids laid out around plazas and courtyards. Three pyramids, structures 1, 2, and 7, offer views above the tree tops. The city's core was bordered on the north side by a 6-metre (20 ft) high wall that controlled access from the north and may also have had a defensive function.

Many commoners residences were built along the edge of El Laberinto swamp to the west of the site core, although some high-status residences and public buildings were interspersed among these. The area between the residences was used for horticulture.

=== Water control ===
The site is surrounded by an extensive network of canals and reservoirs. There are five major reservoirs, including the largest example in the Maya world, measuring 242 by 212 metres (794 by 696 ft). This reservoir is filled by a small seasonal river during the rainy season and continues to hold enough water for it to be used by archaeologists in modern times.

Thirteen reservoirs have been identified at Calakmul. The combined capacity of all the reservoirs is estimated at over 200,000,000 litres (44,000,000 imp gal). This quantity of water could have supported 50,000 to 100,000 people; there is no evidence that the reservoirs were used to irrigate crops.

Aguada 1 is the largest of the reservoirs and has a surface area of 5 hectares (540,000 sq ft).

=== Causeways ===
Eight sacbe (causeways) have been located around Calakmul. Two of these have been mapped, three have been identified visually on the ground and three more identified with remote sensing. They have been numbered as Sacbe 1 through to Sacbe 7. The causeway network not only linked Calakmul with local satellite sites but also with more distant allies and rivals, such as the great cities of El Mirador, El Tintal and Nakbe. Those causeways that cross swampy land are elevated above the surrounding wetland and they now tend to support denser vegetation than the surrounding forest.

Sacbe 1 is 450 metres (1,480 ft) long and is lined and filled with stone. It is located within the mapped urban area of the site core. Sacbe 1 was first mapped in the 1930s by the Carnegie Institution of Washington.

Sacbe 2 is 70 metres (230 ft) long. It has been mapped within the urban area of the site core. Sacbe 2 is built of packed earth and was discovered during the archaeological excavation of a nearby quarry. This causeway may have been built to transport stone from the quarry in order to build Structures 1 and 3.

Sacbe 3 extends 8 kilometres (5.0 mi) northeast from the site core and is visible from the summit of Structure 1. It was first discovered in 1982.

Sacbe 4 runs 24 kilometres (15 mi) southeast from the site core, it is also visible from the summit of Structure 1 and was discovered in 1982.

Sacbe 5 runs westwards from the main watering hole, across El Laberinto seasonal swamp and carries on for a total distance of 16 kilometres (9.9 mi) or more towards Sasilhá.

Sacbe 6 runs southwest across El Laberinto bajo and links Calakmul with El Mirador (38.25 kilometres (23.77 mi) to the southwest) and, beyond it, El Tintal (an additional 30 kilometres (19 mi).

Sacbe 7 is located south of Sacbe 6. It is at least 5.1 kilometres (3.2 mi) long and runs across El Laberinto swamp.

Sacbe 8 is on the west side of the swamp and does not appear to cross it to the site core.

=== Structures ===
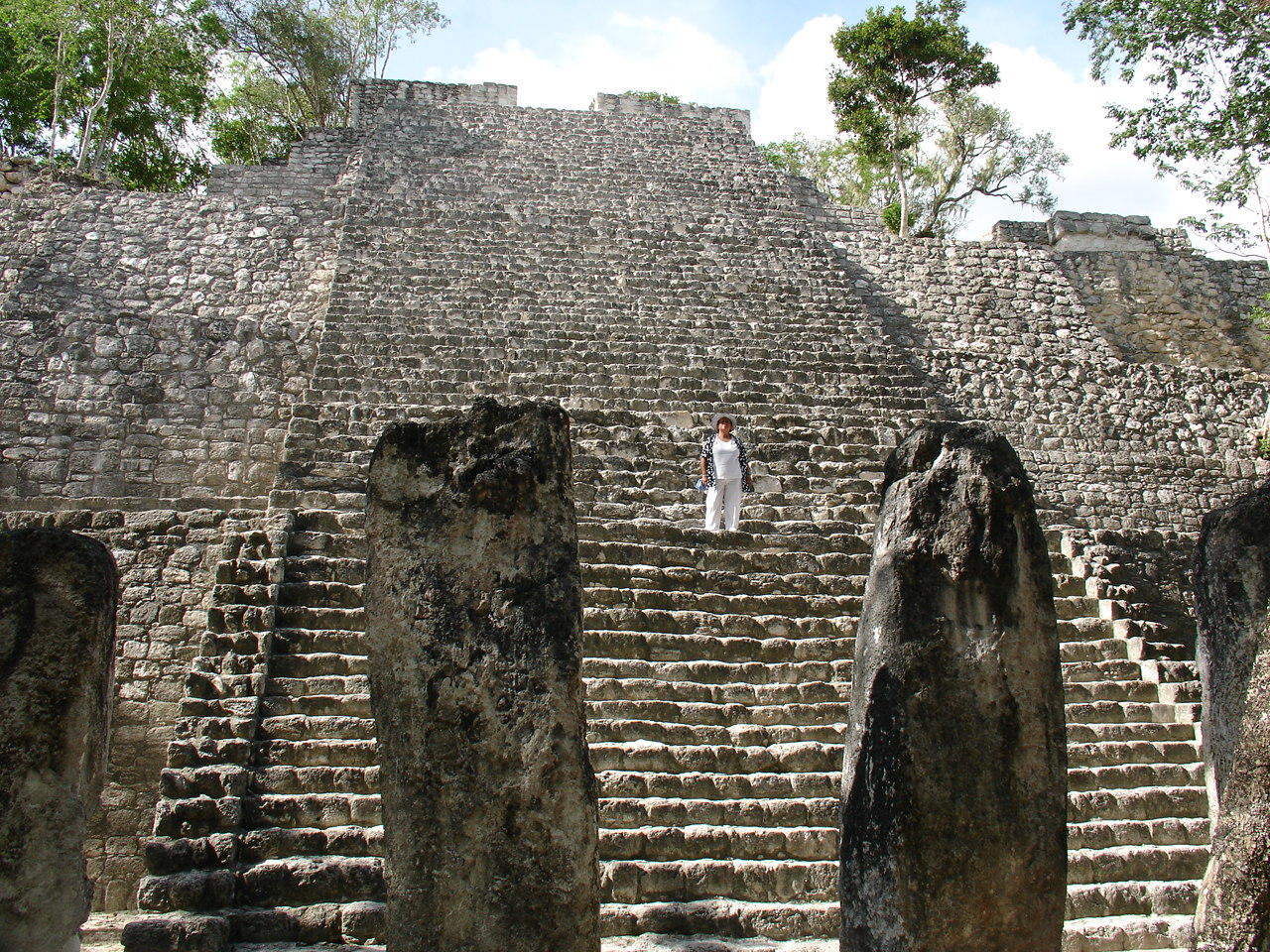
Structure I.

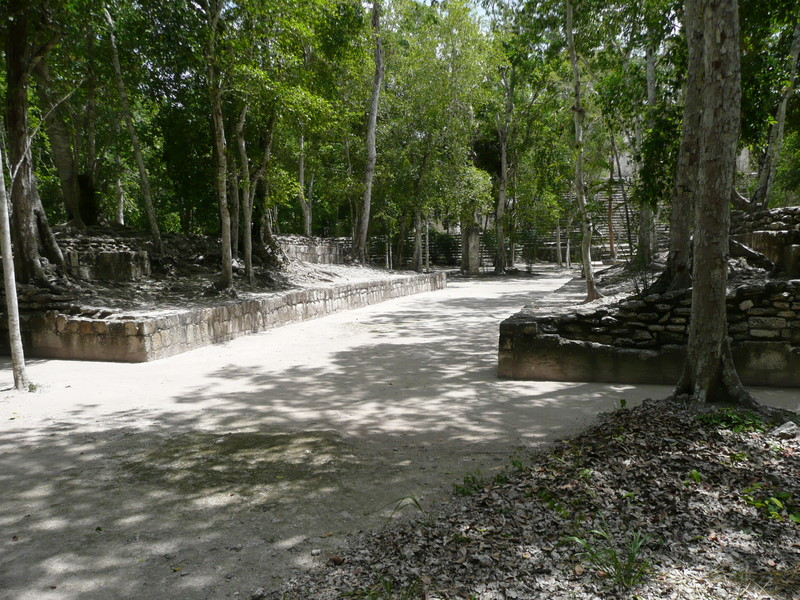
Ballcourt at Calakmul

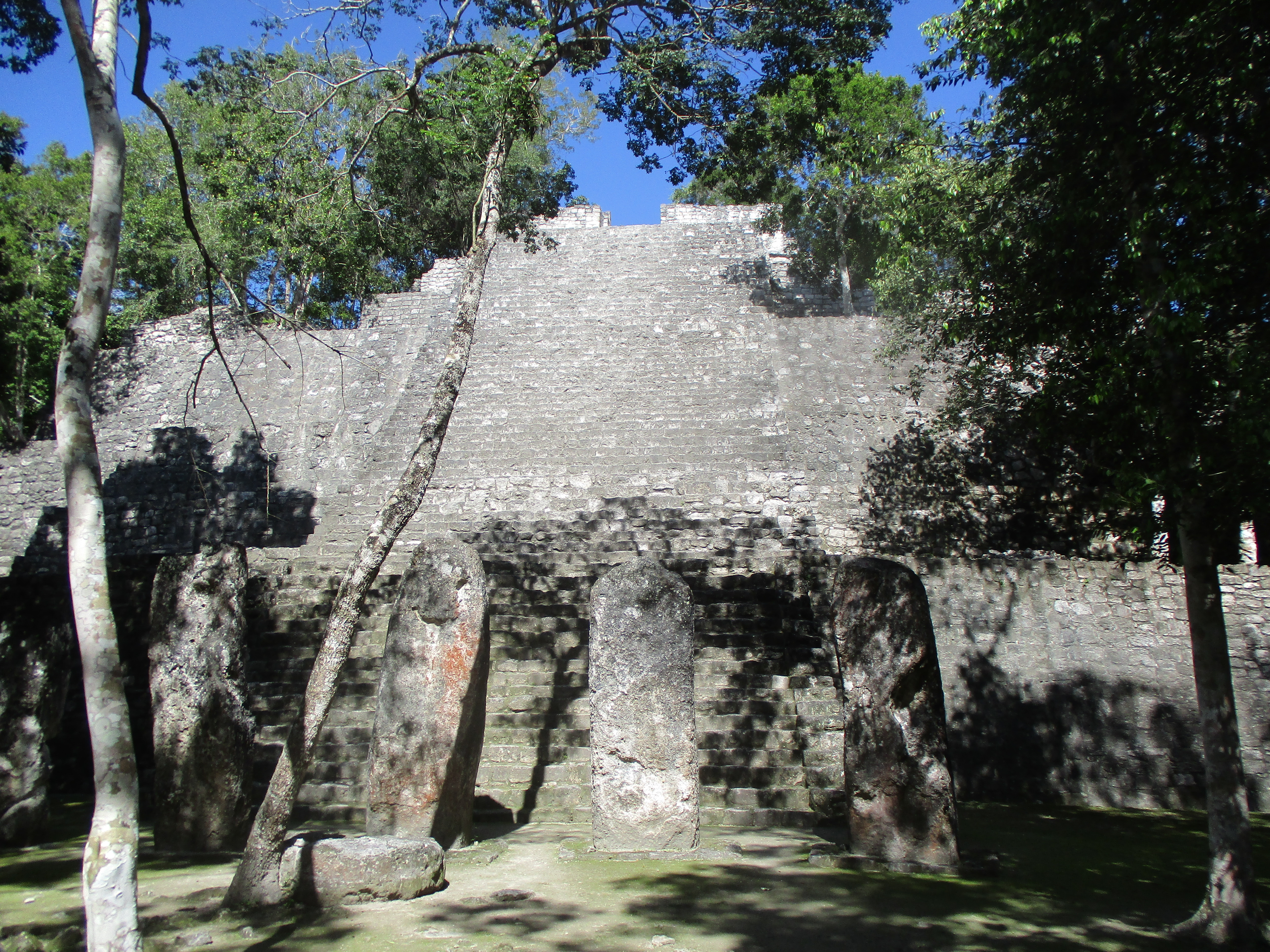
Calakmul

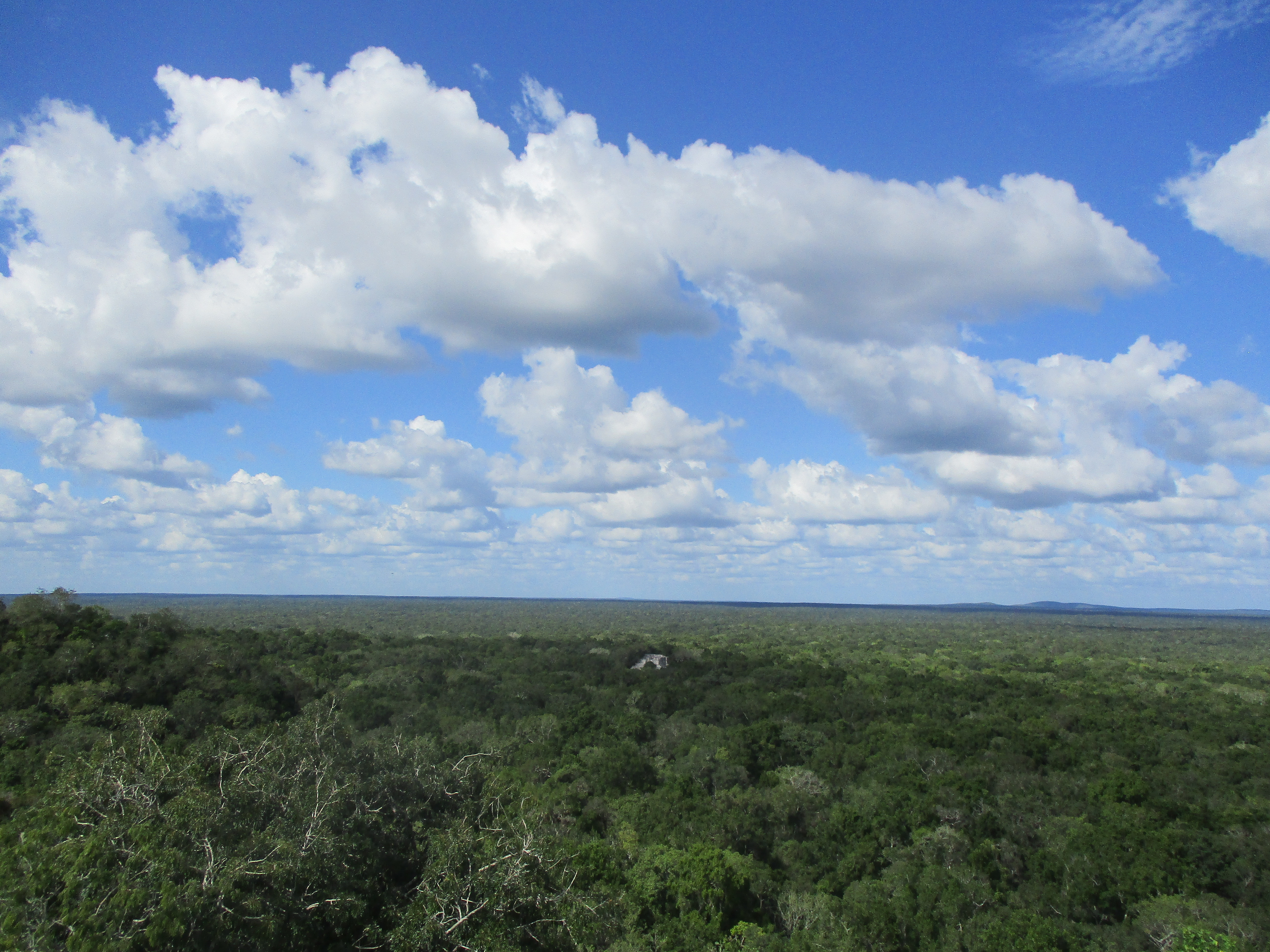
Calakmul

Structure 1 (or Structure I) is a 50-metre-high (160 ft) pyramid to the east of the site core. A number of stelae were erected at its base by Yuknoom Took' K'awiil in 731. Because it was built on a low hill, Structure 1 appears to be higher than Structure 2, although this is not the case.

Structure 2 (or Structure II) is a massive north-facing pyramid temple, one of the largest in the Maya world. Its base measures 120 metres (390 ft) square and it stands over 45 metres (148 ft) high. In common with many temple pyramids in the Mesoamerican cultural region, the pyramid at Calakmul increased in size by building upon the pre-existing temple in order to increase its bulk. The core of the building (Structure 2A) is a triadic pyramid dating to the Late Preclassic period, with this ancient building still forming the highest point of the structure. In the Early Classic a massive extension was added to the front of the pyramid, covering an earlier stucco-covered building on the north side. Three new shrines were built upon this extension (Structures 2B, 2C and 2D), each of these shrines had its own access stairway. Structure 2B was the central shrine, 2C was to the east and 2D to the west. The facade possessed six large masks set between these stairways, three arranged vertically on each side of the central stairway. Structure 2 is similar in date, size and design to the El Tigre pyramid at El Mirador, and associated ceramics are also similar. At a later time buildings were erected along the base of the facade, each of these contained stelae.

In the 8th century AD, Structure 2B was entombed under a large pyramid and a stepped facade covered the giant masks. Later another facade was built over this 8th-century stepped frontage but it may never have been finished. In the Late Classic a nine-room palace was built on top of the pyramid, supporting a roof comb that had painted stucco bas-relief decoration. The rooms were arranged in three groups of three, each room positioned behind the next. The entire Late Classic palace measured 19.4 by 12 metres (64 by 39 ft). The front two rows of rooms (Rooms 1 through to 6) were used for food preparation, metates and hearths were found in each of them. Room 7, the southwest room, was a sweatbath.

Structure 3 (or Structure III, also known as the Lundell Palace) is southeast of Structure 4, on the east side of the Central Plaza. It is a building with multiple rooms.

Structure 4 (or Structure IV) is a group of three temples on the east side of the Central Plaza. It is divided into three sections, labelled Structures 4a, 4b and 4c. The central Structure 4b is built upon a substructure dating to the Preclassic period. Together with Structure 6 on the opposite side of the plaza, these buildings form an E-Group that may have been used to determine the solstices and the equinoxes.

Structure 5 (or Structure V) is a large building located on the plaza to the north of Structure 2. It was surrounded by 10 stelae, many dated to the 7th century AD although the building itself was first erected in the Preclassic period.

Structure 6 (or Structure VI) is on the west side of the Central Plaza and, together with Structures 4a, 4b and 4c, forms an E-Group astronomical complex. In 1989 observations verified that on March 21, the vernal equinox, the sun rose behind Structure 4b as seen from Structure 6.

Structure 7 (or Structure VII) is a temple pyramid on the north side of the Central Plaza. It faces south and stands 24 metres (79 ft) high. Five plain stelae were erected on the south side of the pyramid. It underwent several construction phases from in the Late to Terminal Classic. The pyramid was topped by a three-room temple that possessed a tall stucco-covered roof comb. A patolli game board was carved into the floor of the outermost room of the temple.

Structure 8 (or Structure VIII) is a small building located on the north side of the Central Plaza, to the east of Structure 7. It is associated with Stela 1 and its altar.

=== Stelae, murals and ceramics ===
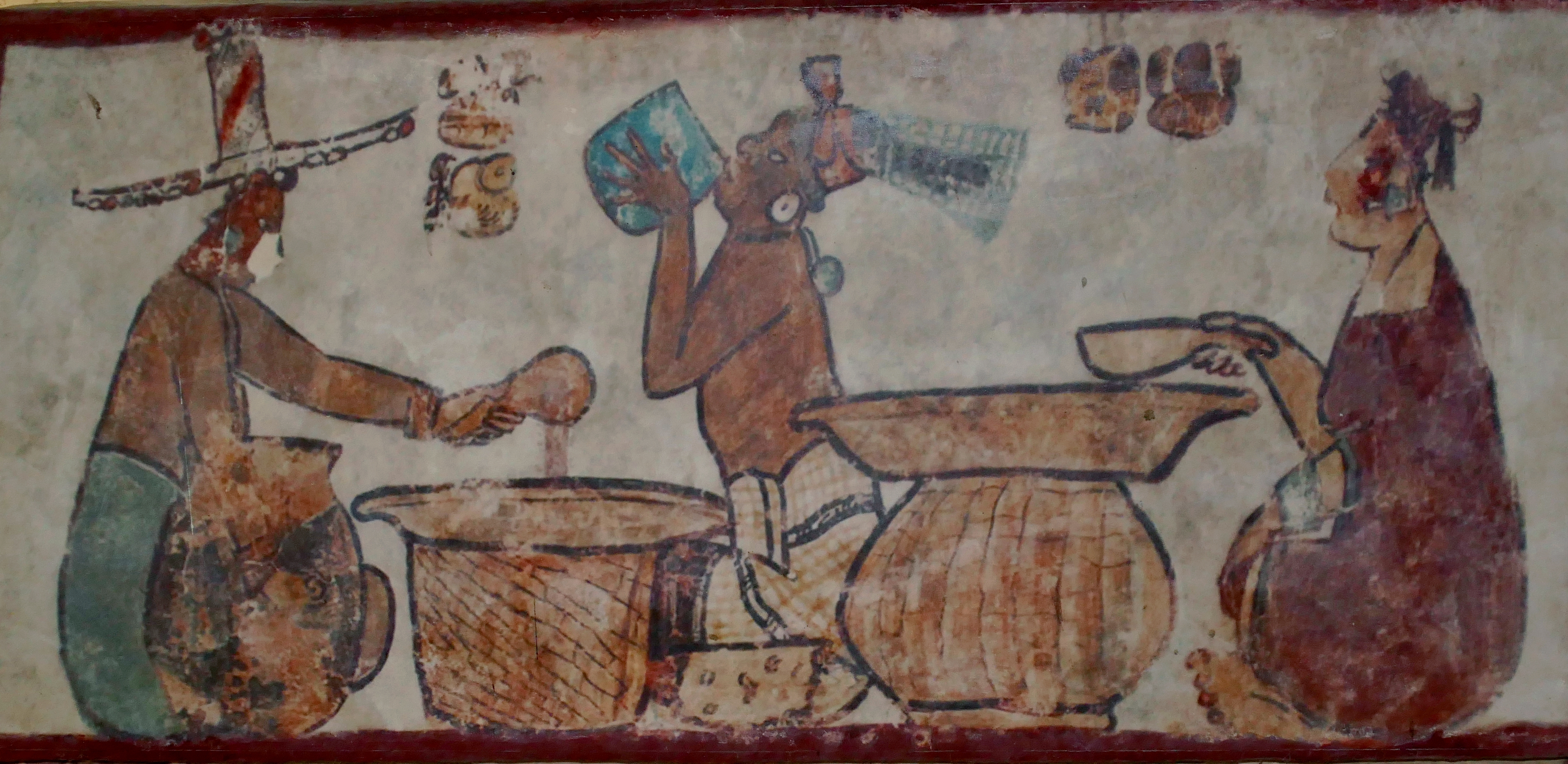
Reproduction of Mural from Structure I, Calakmul

Calakmul is one of the most structure-rich sites within the Maya region. The site contains 117 stelae, the largest total in the region. Most are in paired sets representing rulers and their wives. However, because these carved stelae were produced in soft limestone, most of these stelae have been eroded beyond interpretation. Also many elaborate murals were discovered at Calakmul. The Chiik Naab murals do not represent activities of the elite class. Rather, they depict elaborate market scenes of people preparing or consuming products such as atole, tamales, or tobacco as an ointment. Also items being sold were textiles and needles. These murals also have glyphs within them describing the actions occurring. They are not accessible to the public.

The most prominent figure in these murals is identified as Lady Nine Stone; she appears in many scenes. This brings a world of the Maya marketplace to vibrant life for archaeologists. Another highly beneficial resource to Maya archaeological understanding at Calakmul is the ceramic remains. The composition of the ceramic materials identifies the region or more specifically the polity that produced them. Ceramics with the snake emblem glyph found at several sites also give more evidence to identify ties or control over that site by Calakmul.

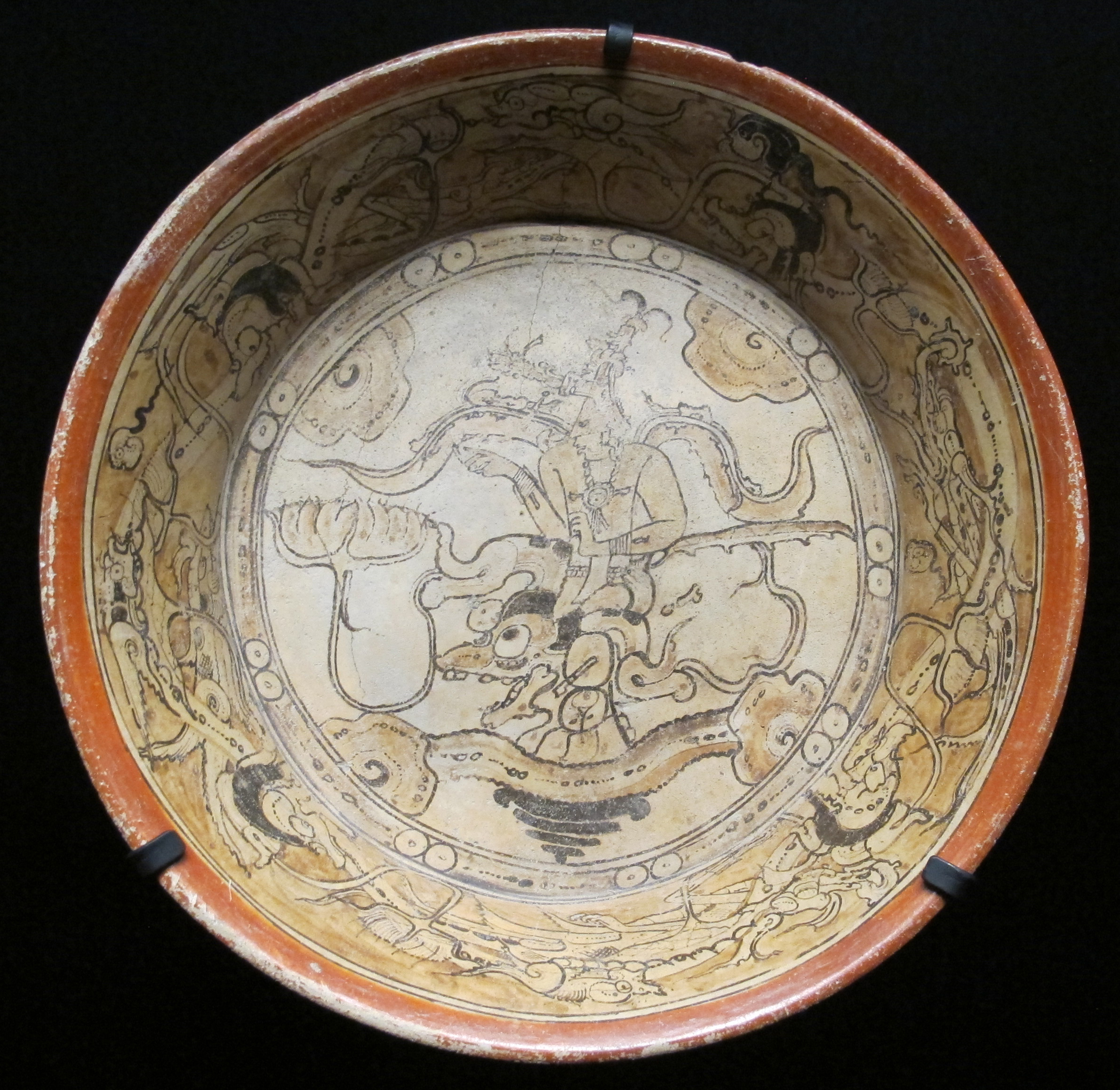
Calakmul ceramic plate, AD 600-800

Stela 1 is associated with an altar and located by Structure 8.

Stela 8 records the celebration of an event in AD 593 by Uneh Chan and was erected after his death.

Stela 9 is a thin slate monument dated to 662. Its text describes the birth of king Yuknoom Yich'aak K'ak' and gives him his full royal title.

Stela 28 and Stela 29 were erected in 623 and are the earliest monuments to survive from Late Classic Calakmul. They depict a royal couple but the texts are too poorly preserved to reveal their names.

Stela 33 was erected by Yuknoom Che'en II in 657 and records an event in the reign of Uneh Chan, who may have been his father. The event was celebrated in 593.

Stela 38 stands at the base of Structure 2.

Stela 42 is also located at the base of Structure 2.

Stela 43 dates to AD 514. It was set in a vaulted chamber near the base of Structure 2. The text is damaged but carries an early spelling of the k'uhul chatan winik non-royal noble title used in Calakmul and the Mirador Basin.

Stela 50 is one of the last monuments erected during the final decline of the city. It bears a crude, clumsily executed portrait.

Stela 51 is the best preserved monument at Calakmul. It depicts Yuknoom Took' K'awiil and dates to AD 731.

Stela 54 dates to 731 and depicts a wife of Yuknoom Took' K'awiil.

Stela 57 is a tall stela erected in 771 by B'olon K'awiil. It is paired with Stela 58 and stands to the east of Structure 13.

Stela 58 is the second of a pair erected by B'olon K'awiil in 771, the other being Stela 57. It was erected to the east of Structure 13.

Stela 61 is a late monument bearing the name Aj Took'. It is a stunted stela with a badly eroded portrait and a shortened date form that is equivalent to a date either in 899 or 909, probably the latter.

Stela 62 was unfinished. It was carved to mark the K'atun-ending ceremony of 751 and bears the damaged name of Ruler Z.

Stela 76 and Stela 78 are a pair of monuments dated to AD 633. They are badly eroded but should date to the reign of king Yuknoom Head.

Stela 84 is one of the last monuments erected at Calakmul and bears an inscription that is an illiterate imitation of writing. It probably dates to the early 10th century AD.

Stela 88 may have been paired with Stela 62. The monument has the image of a queen but her name is unknown. B'olon K'awiil also appears to be mentioned on the stela. It dates to around 751 and stands on the stairway of Structure 13. Stela 91 is another very late monument probably dating to the early 10th century. Like Stela 84, it bears an inscription that is a meaningless imitation of hieroglyphic writing.

Stela 114 dates to AD 435, in the Early Classic. It was moved in antiquity to be reset into the base of Structure 2. The stela has a long hieroglyphic text that has resisted translation but probably commemorates a royal enthronement in 411.

Stela 115 and Stela 116 date to the reign of Yuknoom Yich'aak K'ak'. They were broken and buried in Structure 2 and may be associated with the royal burial in Tomb 4.

=== Royal marriages ===
in order to sustain political and economic exchange marriage for elites in the Spanish contact period established a known bride price met with strict obligations women had to follow. however, both parties contribute. gender specific goods were common such as, women receiving jewelry or goods, cocoa beans, cotton mantles, and jade beads

=== Royal burial ===
Tomb 4 was set into the floor of Structure 2B in the 8th century AD and is the richest burial known from Calakmul. The tomb contained a male skeleton wrapped in textiles and jaguar pelts that were partially preserved with resin. The tomb contained rich offerings that included jade ear ornaments handed down from the Early Classic, a jade mosaic mask, shell and bone beads, spiny oyster shells, eccentric obsidian blades, fine ceramics and the remains of wooden objects. One of the ceramics was a plate with a hieroglyphic text that specifically named king Yuknoom Yich'aak K'ak' as its owner. The remains and the offering were placed in an arched wooden bier carved with elaborate decoration and hieroglyphs that was painted in a variety of colours. The bier has almost completely decayed but left an impression in the mud packed around it. Due to the plate and the possible association of Stelae 115 and 116 with the burial the tomb is believed to be that of the late 7th-century king Yuknoom Yich'aak K'ak'.

== Transportation ==
Xpujil

General information
- Location: Calakmul, Campeche; Mexico
- Coordinates: 18.52988°N 89.904385°W

History
- Opened: December 15, 2024

Services
Preceding station	Tren Maya	Following station
Centenario toward Palenque	Tren Maya	Xpujil toward Cancún Airport
Location

Calakmul is served by a station of the Tren Maya, which opened on December 15, 2024

== See also ==
- Calakmul Biosphere Reserve
- El Zotz
- List of Mesoamerican pyramids
- Maya Classic Period
- K'àak' Chi'
