= Nadzca'an =

Mayan Classical Period Archealogical Site in Campeche, Mexico

- Location within Campeche Location within Mexico
- 18°36′25″N 89°51′06″W
- Type: Ancient Maya City
- Periods: Late Preclassic - Classic
- Cultures: Maya civilization
- Location: Mexico
- Region: Calakmul, Campeche

History
- Built: 150 - 200 AD
- Abandoned: 900 - 1000 AD

Site notes
- Architectural style: Rio Bec
- Discovered: 1993

Nadzca'an is a Maya archaeological site located in the Balam Kú Biosphere Reserve of Campeche in Mexico. Nadzca'an was a classical period Maya city and ceremonial center built over an artificial plateau. It is located approximately 12 km northeast of the Maya site of Balamku. Numerous stelas have been found inside the main structures of the site, a mention to the emblem glyph of Calakmul is found carved on a monument from Nadzca'an.

== Architecture ==
The archaeological site of Nadzca'an is divided into three architectural groups named Ah Kin, Chi'ik and Río Bec, which host two plazas, a ball court and several monumental buildings.

The Ah Kin group is the main architectural group of the site and has structures from the early Classic to the late Classic periods.

== History ==
Nadzca'an occupation began at the end of the Preclassic period and extended until the late Classic period, the development of the city covers approximately between the years 200 AD to 1000 AD. During this long development period, the site presented an important architectural change and evolution from the Peten style to the stylish Río Bec style.

The site was discovered in 1993 near the Escárcega–Chetumal highway and the community of Conhuas inside the thick jungle of Campeche. The site is now part of the protected zone of the Balam Kú Biosphere Reserve.
