= Kʼàakʼ Chiʼ =

Hypothetical archaeological site of the Pre-Columbian Maya civilization

Coordinates: 17°56′41.98″N 90°09′58.08″W

Kʼàakʼ Chiʼ (“Mouth of Fire”) is a hypothetical archaeological site of the pre-Columbian Maya civilization, proposed by then 15-year-old William Gadoury of Saint-Jean-de-Matha, Quebec in 2016. It is located in the state of Campeche in southern Mexico, in the extreme south of the Yucatán Peninsula. The location was determined by overlaying Maya constellations with a map of the Yucatán Peninsula.

The alleged site has caused controversy as Mayanist scholars have cast doubt upon the potential discovery. Field verification in summer of 2021 demonstrates that there is no archaeological site at this location.

== Remote prediction ==
The hypothetical discovery is based on analysis by the Canadian Space Agency of satellite data from NASA, and from the Japanese Space Agency, JAXA. The position of the site was posited by William Gadoury based on his theory that Maya site locations correlated with their astronomical data matching 117 known Maya sites with the positions of stars in 22 supposed "Maya constellations". Kʼàakʼ Chiʼ lies at a location suggested by a supposed 23rd constellation (containing three stars) with only two known sites corresponding on the ground. However, the density of Maya cities in the region is such that the supposed alignment of Maya sites with the constellations has been attributed to coincidence.

Gadoury reported that his study was sparked by reading the Mayan doomsday prophesies in 2012:

I did not understand why the Maya built their cities away from rivers, on marginal lands and in the mountains... They had to have another reason, and as they worshipped the stars, the idea came to me to verify my hypothesis... I was really surprised and excited when I realised that the most brilliant stars of the constellations matched the largest Maya cities.

— William Gadoury

== Archeological exploration ==
Archaeologist Richard Hansen noted that the location is also very close to the Maya ruins of Uxul, which have been the subject of archaeological investigation since 2009. Mexican archaeologist Rafael Cobos Palma pointed out that the area of the supposed discovery has been extensively explored by archaeologists since the 1930s, and was very close to various already-identified Maya sites in southern Campeche.

== Doubts cast on the find ==
The Instituto Nacional de Antropología e Historia (INAH) (National Institute of Anthropology and History) in Mexico said it was not even “considering” the alleged find, since “there is no scientific basis for it”.

Mayanist David Stuart cast doubt upon the discovery, describing it as an example of "junk science", and identified the object on satellite imagery as an old cornfield, or milpa. Mayanist Geoffrey Braswell of the University of California stated that the object is definitely not a Maya pyramid, and identified the imagery as either an abandoned milpa or an active marijuana field.

In a response to the alleged discovery, anthropologist and astronomer Anthony Aveni stated that trying to correlate a direct correspondence between a star map and a large quantity of man-made features is "an act of creative imagination." Aveni has pointed out that there are several competing theories as to what the 13 Maya zodiacal constellations represent, and how they are arranged.

Mayanist Francisco Estrada-Belli has pointed out that even if a Maya site were to be located in the predicted place, it could be down to coincidence since there are likely to be hundreds of undiscovered Maya archaeological sites; he commented that the chances were very good of putting a finger anywhere on a map of the region and pinpointing a Maya site. He also offered an invitation for Gadoury to come to Mexico with him to look for Mayan sites.

Armand LaRocque of the remote sensing laboratory of the University of New Brunswick is reported as saying while satellite imagery might indicate a pyramid and building, anomalies identified in the satellite imagery needed further study and were not definitely man-made.

Mayanist Nikolai Grube of the University of Bonn, Germany who had worked in the area of concern for several years pointed out in an interview with the Spiegel-Magazin that the sites taken into consideration in Gadoury's theory had been built several decades apart, which made the theory of a common planning of those sites improbable.

During a reconnaissance trip into the Calakmul Biosphere in the summer of 2021, Jerald Ek verified that there are no significant archaeological sites in the proposed location of Kʼàakʼ Chiʼ east of the Laguna La Amapola, including the location of the rectilinear feature identified in satellite imagery and adjacent topographic features.

== See also ==
- Orion correlation theory – Fringe hypothesis in alternative Egyptology
- Thunderbird Entertainment#The Teenager and the Lost Mayan City
