= Kʼinich Yat Ahk II =

- Ajaw
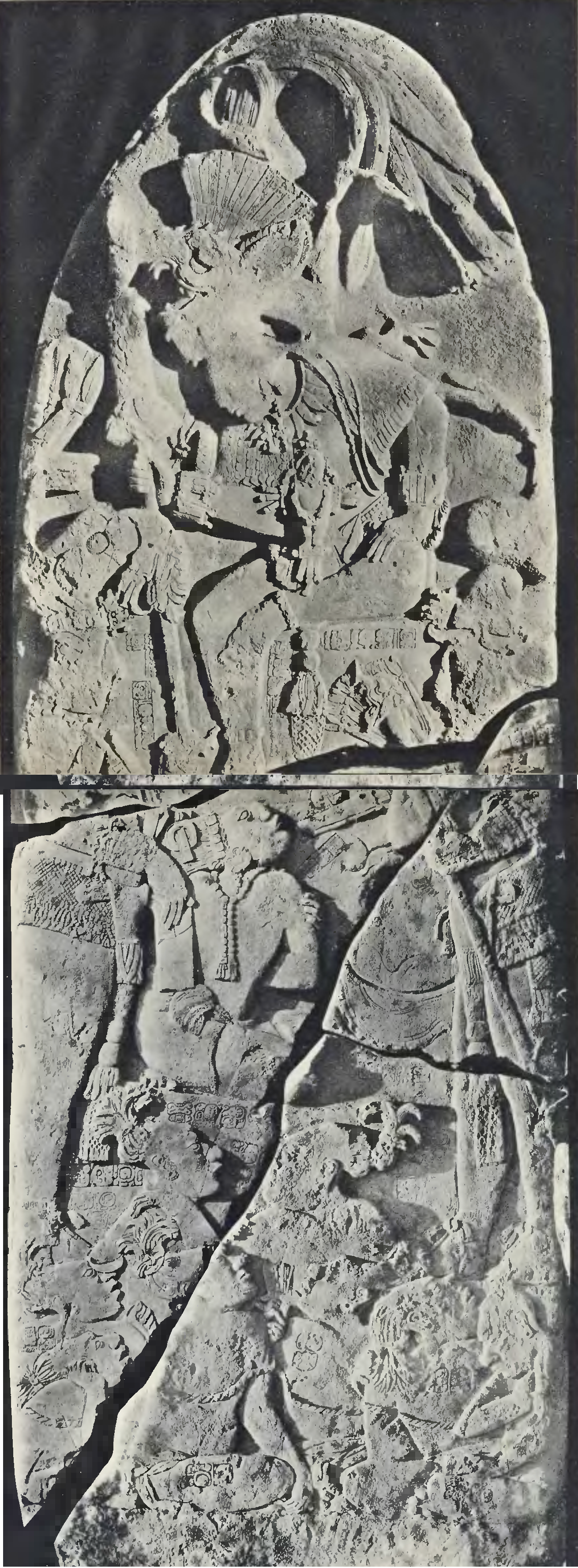
- Kʼinich Yat Ahk II's portrait in Stela 12

King of Piedras Negras
- Reign: 31 May 781 - 808
- Predecessor: Haʼ Kʼin Xook
- Successor: None; Capture of the kingdom by Yaxchilán
- Born: 7 April 750; Piedras Negras
- Died: c. 808 or after
- Father: Itzam Kʼan Ahk II? Tʼul Chiik?
- Mother: Lady Bird
- Religion: Maya religion

Kʼinich Yat Ahk II (Mayan pronunciation: [kʼinitʃ jat akh]), also known as Ruler 7, was the last ajaw of Piedras Negras, an ancient Maya settlement in Guatemala. He ruled during the Late Classic Period, from 781 to roughly 808 AD. Possibly a descendant of Itzam Kʼan Ahk II, Kʼinich Yat Ahk II ascended the throne upon the death of his brother, the sixth ajaw of the site, Haʼ Kʼin Xook. While Kʼinich Yat Ahk II presided over the destruction of the rival Maya site Pomona, his reign likely ended with Kʼinich Tatbu Skull IV of Yaxchilan capturing and subjugating Piedras Negras. Itzam Kʼan Ahk II left behind several monuments, including stelae at Piedras Negras, a stone seat known as Throne 1 which records either the death or abdication of Haʼ Kʼin Xook, and Panel 3 which recounts the exploits of Itzam Kʼan Ahk II.

== Biography ==
=== Reign of Piedras Negras ===
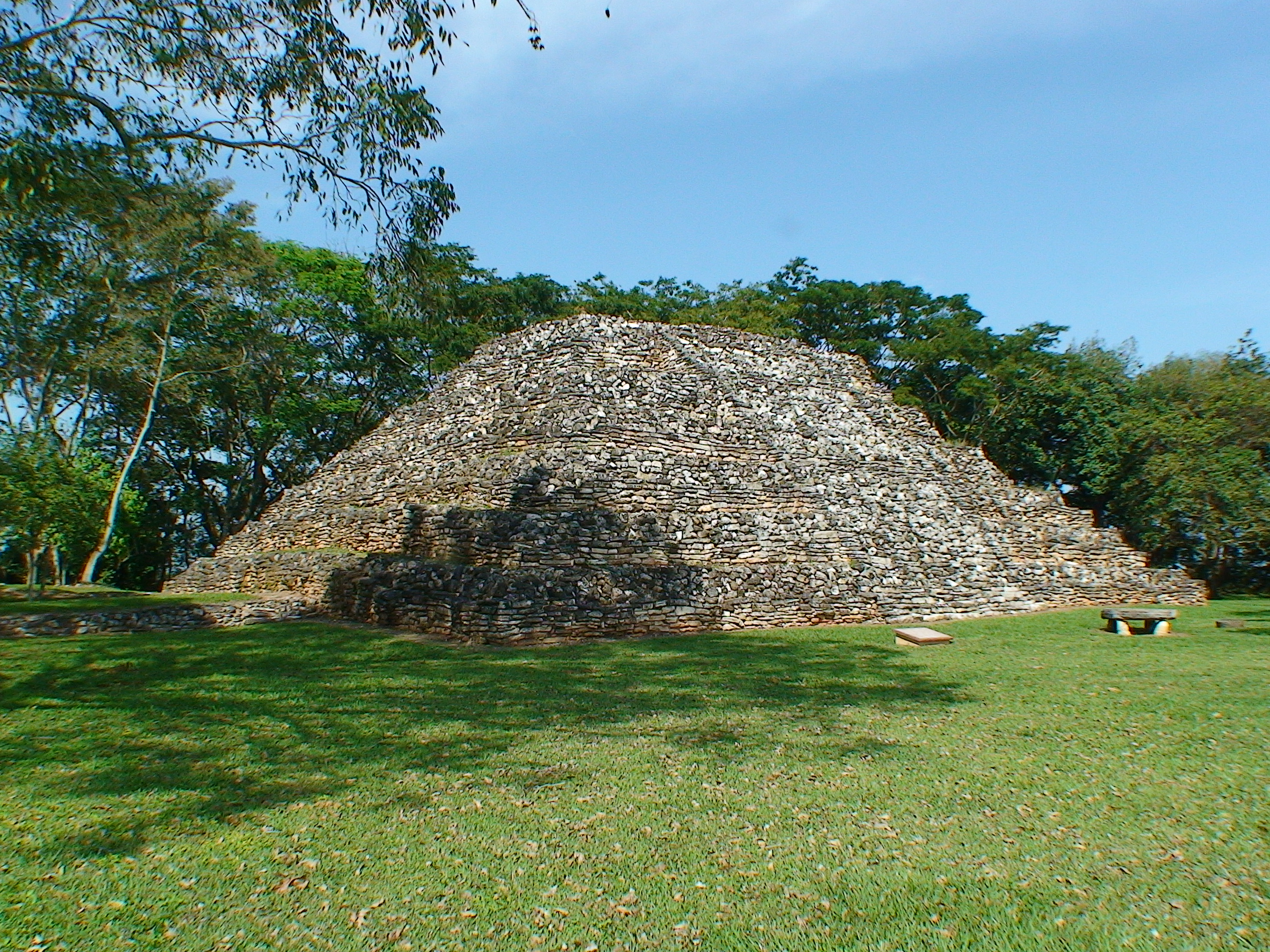
Kʼinich Yat Ahk II is known to have engaged in two wars against the Maya polity Pomona (pictured).

Likely the final ajaw of Piedras Negras, Kʼinich Yat Ahk II (also known as Ruler 7) was the son of Lady Bird, and was born on April 7, 750 AD (9.15.18.16.7 12 Mankiʼ 5 Sotzʼ in the Long Count). It is possible that he was the son of Itzam Kʼan Ahk II, or perhaps Tʼul Chiik, a prince of Piedras Negras. The ruler's name is a combination of two elements: a title and a predecessor's name. The title, kʼinich, translates to "red-faced", and is a reference to the settlement's rulers' belief that they were the "lords of the sun". The name portion, Yat Ahk, was not taken from one of Kʼinich Yat Ahk II's immediate predecessors, but rather from one of Piedras Negras's earliest rulers, Yat Ahk I. Kʼinich Yat Ahk II took up the throne at Piedras Negras on May 31, 781 (9.17.10.9.4 1 Kʼan 7 Yaxkʼin), almost a year following the death of his brother, Haʼ Kʼin Xook. Despite this lengthy gap, there is no evidence that anyone ruled Piedras Negras in the interim.

=== Acts of aggression ===
Kʼinich Yat Ahk II first took military action against his opponents in August of 787 AD, capturing a yajaw kʼahk (a "lord of fire") from Santa Elena Poco Uinic. Then, in both 792 and 794 AD, Kʼinich Yat Ahk II carried out two "star wars" (that is, wars planned to coincide with key astronomical events) against the rival Maya settlement Pomona, the latter of the two resulting in Pomona being decisively defeated and subordinated. Kʼinich Yat Ahk II was aided in both of these wars by his ally, Parrot Chaak of La Mar.

=== Capture ===
In AD 808, Piedras Negras's sworn enemy Yaxchilan, ruled by Kʼinich Tatbu Skull IV, conquered Piedras Negras and subjugated Kʼinich Yat Ahk II, ending his rule; Lintel 10 at Yaxchilan directly names Kʼinich Yat Ahk II as a captive of the Yaxchilan ajaw. There is evidence that troops from Yaxchilan attacked Piedras Negras and razed it, as debris and burnt artifacts have been documented throughout the site, and it appeared that Throne 1 was deliberately dismantled. In the 1930s, certain researchers argued that this evidence suggested that the ruling class had been overthrown in a "peasants revolt" but modern scholars largely reject this idea. Regardless, Simon Martin and Nikolai Grube, and Mayanist Stephen D. Houston argue that the Piedras Negras dynasty may have survived for a time after the capture and death of Kʼinich Yat Ahk II, but its power was severely curtailed and fizzled out around c. 810 AD. Afterwards, Piedras Negras declined in importance and was eventually abandoned to the jungles of Guatemala.

== Monuments ==
=== Stelae ===
Several stelae have been found that were erected by Kʼinich Yat Ahk II, including Stelae 12 and 15, which were sculpted out of limestone. The first to be raised was Stela 15, which celebrated Kʼinich Yat Ahk II's first hotun ending as ajaw of Piedras Negras. The monument, positioned on the upper terrace of Pyramid O-13, is "innovative", because it is almost a three-dimensional depiction of the leader. This innovation was the result of Piedras Negras sculptors fine-tuning their technical skills and marked "the closest [the sculptors of Piedras Negras] came to releasing the body from the stone block", according to O'Neil. The monument bears some stylistic similarities to Haʼ Kʼin Xook's Stela 13, and given that Stela 15 is positioned above Stela 13 on the northwestern side of Pyramid O-13, it was likely that Stela 15 was erected to purposely associate Kʼinich Yat Ahk II with Haʼ Kʼin Xook.

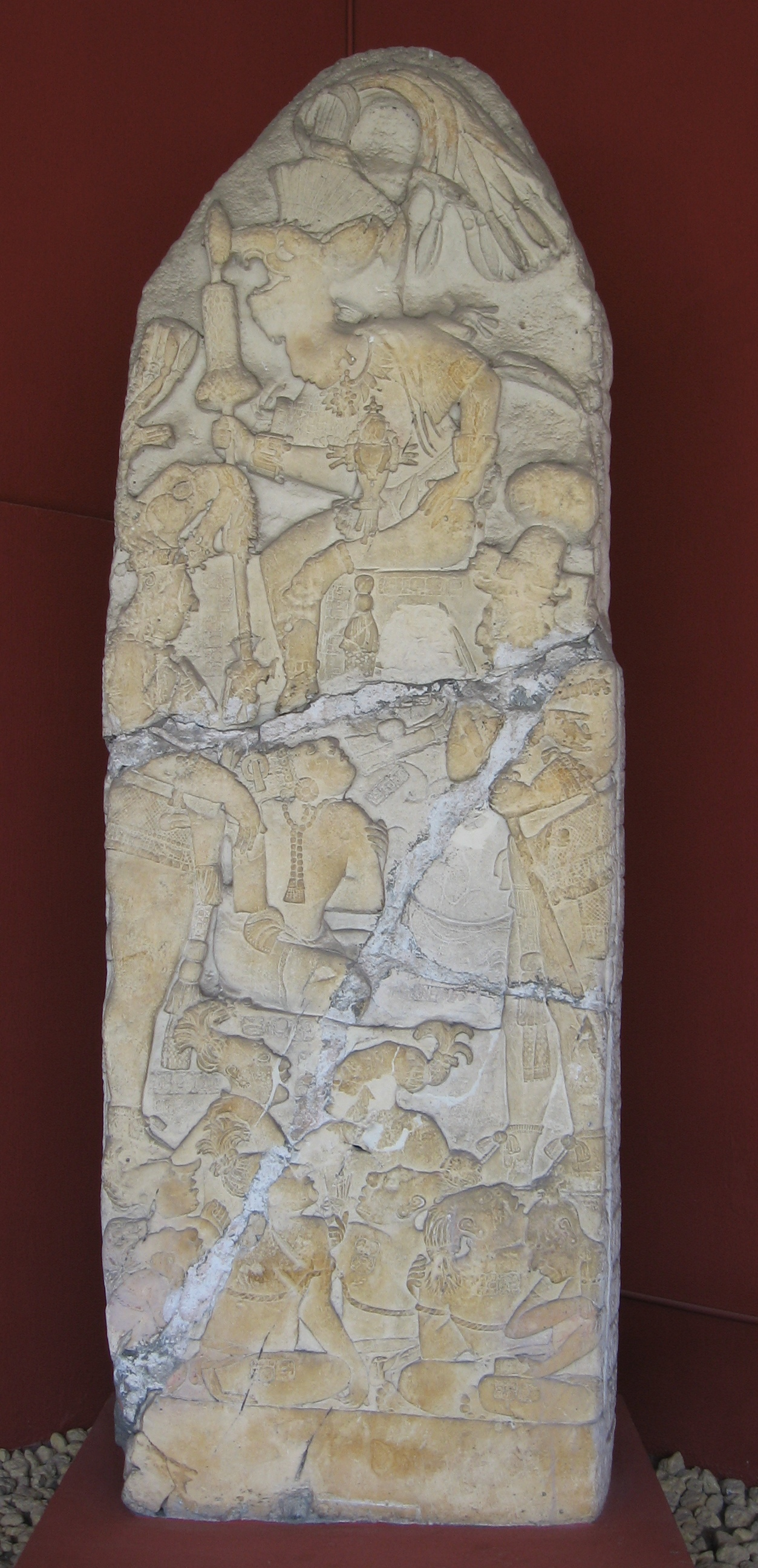
Stela 12 details Kʼinich Yat Ahk II's victory over Pomona.

The final stela to be erected was Stela 12 and details Kʼinich Yat Ahk II's aforementioned victory over Pomona, showing KʼInich Yat Ahk II above military leaders and captives (of which a few are named). Stylistically, the stela is more reminiscent of panels found at Piedras Negras, due to its "shallow relief[s]". According to O'Neil, this style is evidence that at this time, "the sculptors … favored multi-figural pictorial narrative over the divine ruler's singular embodiment or three-dimensional presence." Houston et al. argue that this stela is a "monument of vengeance", redressing the defeat of Piedras Negras at the hands of Pomona in 554 AD. While the monument is not a niche stela, it makes reference to the style by showing the "seated ruler at the top ... and other people at lower levels", similar to Stelae 14 and 33. The stela faces southwest, but this is because the monument was installed on the O-13 pyramid, which already faced in this direction. O'Neil has proposed, however, that the orientation was also purposeful, and that Kʼinich Yat Ahk II was trying to connect his stela with those of his forefathers. Stela 12 is in a relatively poor state of preservation, as exposure has weathered it down.

According to O'Neil, Stelae 15 and 12 show two different versions of what it means to be a "proper ruler": Stela 15 depicts Kʼinich Yat Ahk II as a devout practitioner of religion who does his sacred duty. Stela 12, on the other hand, depicts the ajaw as a conqueror, defeating enemies and subjugating rivals. In addition, both Stelae 15 and 12 include the names of several sculptors and artists, one of whom worked on both stelae. These names are difficult to translate because many are unique when compared to extant Mayan glyphic texts.

=== Throne 1 ===
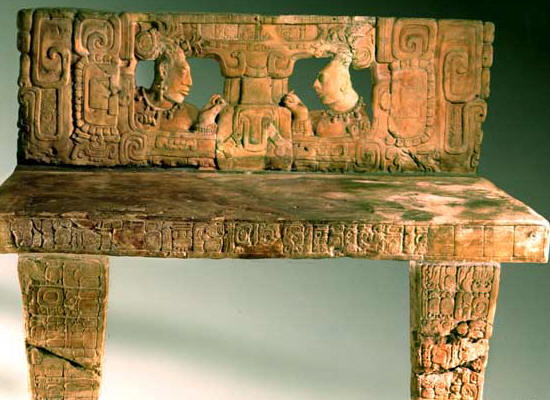
Throne 1 of Piedras Negras, which details the transfer of power from Haʼ Kʼin Xook to Kʼinich Yat Ahk II.

Kʼinich Yat Ahk II likely commissioned the construction of Throne 1, (Note: Due to Parrot Chaak's name appearing on the back of Throne, Stephen Houston proposed that the artifact may have been a gift commissioned by the La Mar leader and given to Kʼinich Yat Ahk II.) which details either the death or abdication of Haʼ Kʼin Xook. The entire throne is covered in images and glyphs, with a prominent zoomorphic face featured on the back. Discovered in a special recess in J-6 (a gallery wing of the main Piedras Negras palace acropolis), the throne was in pieces, but has since been reconstructed. J. Eric S. Thompson proposed three hypotheses to explain its destruction: it had been destroyed in a peasant revolt, it was smashed by conquerors from Yaxchilan, or its destruction "was more recent and is attributable to superstitious fear".

=== Panel 3 ===
Kʼinich Yat Ahk II also commissioned the carving of Panel 3, which was placed on the O-13 Pyramid. The panel is both an intricate narrative of daily life in the palace, as well as a documentation of a 749 AD Kʼatun celebration thrown by the previous ruler Itzam Kʼan Ahk II. According to the artifact, the celebration was attended by many dignitaries, including a bʼaah sajal ("first ruler") named Kʼan Moʼ Teʼ who had served Kʼinich Yoʼnal Ahk II, as well as the interim ruler of Yaxchilan, Yopaat Bahlam II. When Panel 3 was erected, Piedras Negras had begun to decline in importance. Thus, Kʼinich Yat Ahk II likely erected it recall the time when Piedras Negras held supremacy over the region. To this day, many archaeologists and Mayanists consider Panel 3 to be a "masterpiece of Maya art" due to its elucidating the life of Itzam Kʼan Ahk II and his servants, as well as providing information regarding rare grammatical structures in the Mayan glyphs.

== Bibliography ==
- Houston, Stephen (2004). "The Acropolis of Piedras Negras: Portrait of a Court System". In Miller, Mary; Martin, Simon (eds.). Courtly Art of the Ancient Maya. Thames and Hudson. pp. 271–276. ISBN 978-0500051290.
- Houston, Stephen, Héctor Escobedo, Richard Terry, David Webster, George Veni, and Kitty F. Emery (1999). "Among the River Kings: Archaeological Research at Piedras Negras, Guatemala". Mexicon. 22 (1).
- Houston, Stephen; Escobedo, H.; Child, M.; Golden, C.; Terry, R.; Webster, D (2000). "In the Land of the Turtle Lords: Archaeological Investigations at Piedras Negras, Guatemala". Mexicon. 22 (5).
- Martin, Simon; Grube, Nikolai (2000). Chronicle of the Maya Kings and Queens. Thames & Hudson. ISBN 9780500051030.
- Nelson, Zachary (2005). Settlement and Population at Piedras Negras, Guatemala (PDF) (Ph.D.). The University of Pennsylvania.
- O'Neil, Megan (2014). Engaging Ancient Maya Sculpture at Piedras Negras, Guatemala. University of Oklahoma Press. ISBN 9780806188362.
- Pitts, Mark (2011). A Brief History of Piedras Negras as Told by the Ancient Maya: History Revealed in Maya Glyphs (PDF). University of Pennsylvania.
- Zender, Marc (ed.). "Piedras Negras Ruler 7". Mesoweb Encyclopedia. Archived from the original on May 21, 2006.
- Zender, Marc (ed.). "Pomona". Mesoweb Encyclopedia. Archived from the original on March 21, 2006.
