= Haʼ Kʼin Xook =

- Ajaw
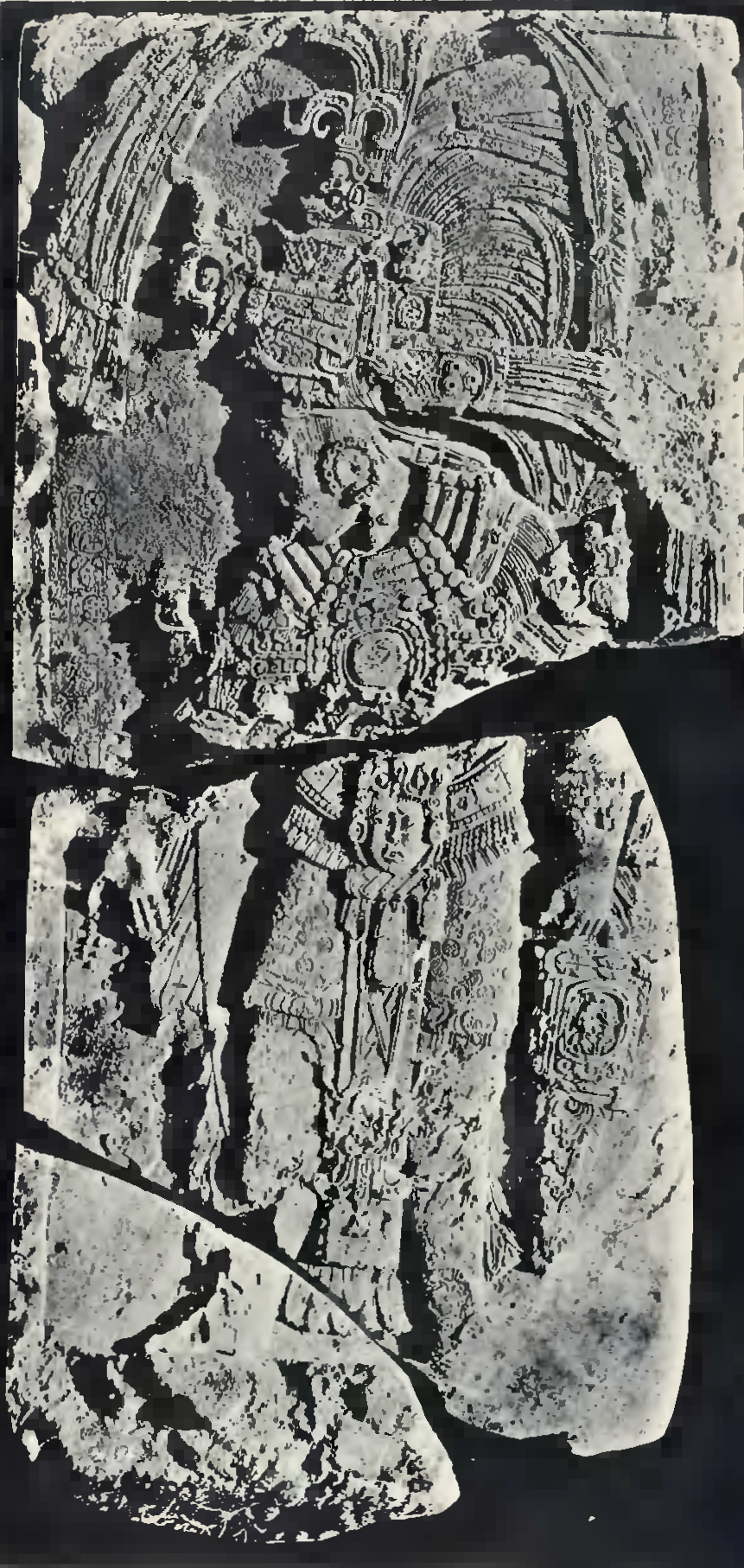
- Haʼ Kʼin Xook's portrait on Stela 13

King of Piedras Negras
- Reign: 14 February 767 - 24 March 780
- Predecessor: Yoʼnal Ahk III
- Successor: Kʼinich Yat Ahk II
- Born: Piedras Negras
- Died: 24 March 780 or after Piedras Negras
- Father: Itzam Kʼan Ahk II
- Religion: Maya religion

Haʼ Kʼin Xook (Mayan pronunciation: [haʔ kʼin ʃoːk]), also known as Ruler 6, was an ajaw of Piedras Negras, an ancient Maya settlement in Guatemala. He ruled during the Late Classic Period, from 767 to 780 AD. Haʼ Kʼin Xook was a son of Itzam Kʼan Ahk II, and he ascended the throne following the death of his brother, Yoʼnal Ahk III. Haʼ Kʼin Xook's reign ended with either his death or his abdication in favor of his brother Kʼinich Yat Ahk II; archaeologists and Mayanists have not arrived at a clear consensus. Haʼ Kʼin Xook left behind several monuments, including stelae at Piedras Negras and a stone fragment from El Porvenir. In addition, a stone seat known as Throne 1 and erected by Kʼinich Yat Ahk II records either the death or abdication of Haʼ Kʼin Xook.

== Biography ==
=== Reign of Piedras Negras ===
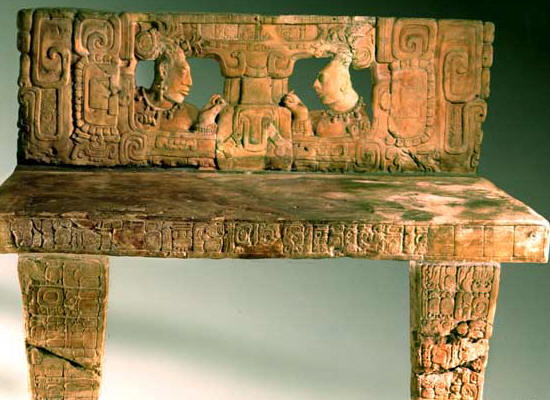
Throne 1 of Piedras Negras, which details the transfer of power from Haʼ Kʼin Xook to his successor Kʼinich Yat Ahk II.

Haʼ Kʼin Xook, who has also been referred to as Ruler 6, was likely the son of Itzam Kʼan Ahk II, based on a translation of Stela 23. According to both Simon Martin and Nikolai Grube, as well as Scott Johnson, Haʼ Kʼin Xook's name translates to "Water Sun Shark". (His name notably does not feature a turtle glyph, a feature found in all the previous rulers of Piedras Negras, as well as his successor.) He ascended the throne on February 14, 767 AD (9.16.16.0.4, 7 Kʼan 17 Pop in the Long Count), following the death of his brother Yoʼnal Ahk III. The Mayanist Tatiana Proskouriakoff had initially overlooked Haʼ Kʼin Xook's reign, as she mistakenly assigned the title Ruler 6 to a sajal (or lesser Maya leader) of La Mar, based on a misreading of Stela 16.

Not much is known about either Haʼ Kʼin Xook or his predecessor Yoʼnal Ahk III, which led Flora Clancy to refer to both their reigns as "shadowy". James L. Fitzsimmons argues that, politically, Haʼ Kʼin Xook was a weak leader, who like Yoʼnal Ahk III before him erected only a handful of monuments and did not enforce his power beyond the existing Piedras Negras hegemony. According to the stone monuments that he did raise, Haʼ Kʼin Xook's reign was comparatively quiet, as the only notable event recorded was the burial of a contemporary sajal at San Ignacio, Belize (El Cayo). According to Zachary Nathan Nelson, the reign of Haʼ Kʼin Xook was also relatively free from war, as none of his extant stelae show representation of captives, and records do not indicate any sort of "bellicose action" in the region during his reign.

=== Death or abdication ===
In the night (of March 24, 780 9.17.9.5.11) Haʼ Kʼin Xok, Ruler 6, Lord of Piedras Negras abandoned the Lordship of Paw Stone place.

— Translation of part of Throne 1 by Mark Pitts, detailing either Haʼ Kʼin Xook's demise or abdication.

Haʼ Kʼin Xook's reign ended on March 24, 780 AD (9.17.9.5.11 10 Chuwen 19 Sip), but the reason why it ended has been a topic of debate. Throne 1, when translated, notes that Haʼ Kʼin Xook "abandoned/transferred rulership" (yaktaaj ajawlel), which American Mayanist Stephen D. Houston interprets to mean that he abdicated so that his brother, Kʼinich Yat Ahk II, could take the throne. Mayanist David Stuart also noted that the wording on the throne "implies a more active event on the ruler's part", but that "'lose' might be more neutral as far as an interpretation goes."

However, yaktaaj ajawlel is the same wording found on a monument, Zoomorph G, at Quiriguá, Guatemala, which details the death of the ajaw Kʼakʼ Tiliw Chan Yopaat in AD 785. This is possible evidence that, rather than abdicating, Haʼ Kʼin Xook died in 780 AD, and Kʼinich Yat Ahk II took up rule later. Adding to this hypothesis is the testimony on Throne 1, which notes that Kʼinich Yat Ahk II later "remembered" Haʼ Kʼin Xook in some way, and that the new king may have even wept at Haʼ Kʼin Xook's memory, according to anthropologist Oswaldo Chinchilla Mazariegos.

Regardless, Kʼinich Yat Ahk II took up the throne on May 31, 781 AD (9.17.10.9.4 1 Kʼan 7 Yaxkʼin), almost a year after Haʼ Kʼin Xook's reign officially ended. Despite this lengthy gap, there is no evidence that anyone ruled Piedras Negras in the interim.

== Monuments ==
=== Stelae ===
Haʼ Kʼin Xook raised several stelae, including Stelae 13, 18, and 23. Stela 23, erected in AD 767, was the first to be raised, and it served as the king's accession monument. This stela details a puluuy utzʼitil ("passing of the torch") ceremony for Itzam Kʼan Ahk II, and, when translated, reads "Ruler 6 [Haʼ Kʼin Xook], child of Ruler 4 [Itzam Kʼan Ahk II] … acceded to the rulership", seemingly proving that Haʼ Kʼin Xook was indeed the offspring of Itzam Kʼan Ahk II. This stela originally featured carvings on all four of its sides, but at some point in the past, it tipped over and crumbled. Mostly only the stela's base and parts of a panel featuring the feet of two individuals remain today.

Erected in AD 771, Stela 13 was Haʼ Kʼin Xook's second monument and features the only extant carving of the ajaw. According to O'Neil, it "captures the essence of the period-ending celebration." This 2.39-metre (7.8 ft) tall stela retains elements of other "niche" stelae, but it also shows innovations and differences from the standard style. It depicts the king dispersing incense, similar to iconography found on Piedras Negras Stelae 2 and 32. Clancy has argued that the iconography on the stela revolves around three motifs: "divination, the quest, and accession". Divination—a motif that had been introduced in the iconography of Piedras Negras by Kʼinich Yoʼnal Ahk II—is shown via the act of Haʼ Kʼin Xook dispersing the incense. The stela also features Haʼ Kʼin Xook wearing a headdress composed of "three knots and forehead scrolls, the projecting Water Lily Jaguar ... and the flexible rectangular emblem made of a thick net and a jaguar pelt". It has been postulated that this headdress was inspired by a similar headdress featured on Stela 5. Clancy argues that this headdress is a representation of "the royal theme of quest", due to its iconographic similarity to other stelae at Piedras Negras.

Not much remains of the king's final monument, Stela 18, which was raised in AD 775. The stela is heavily eroded, but archaeologist Sylvanus Morley claimed that it expressed a Calendar Round date of 6 Ahaw 13 Kʼayab (corresponding to a Long Count date of 9.17.5.0.0 or Dec. 27, 775), which is within Haʼ Kʼin Xook's reign.

Stelae 13 and 18 were discovered by Teoberto Maler in 1901 near Pyramid O-13. Stela 13 was possibly erected on a terrace reached by the pyramid's main stairway, and Stela 18 lies in a row on the plaza in front of the aforementioned stairway. Pyramid O-13 was most likely the burial place for Itzam Kʼan Ahk II, and was revered by Haʼ Kʼin Xook, Yoʼnal Ahk III, and Kʼinich Yat Ahk II as "a dynastic shrine". Stela 23, unlike the others, was erected at the very base of Pyramid O-12.

=== Other ===
As mentioned before, Throne 1 details either the death or abdication of Haʼ Kʼin Xook. After the fall of Piedras Negras, the throne—which was not constructed by the king himself, but rather by his successor, Kʼinich Yat Ahk II—was smashed, likely by Piedras Negras's enemies (although it has since been reconstructed). In addition to on-site remains and relics, an artifact known as the "El Porvenir Fragment" was discovered—as its name suggests—at El Porvenir and bears the name of Haʼ Kʼin Xook.

== Bibliography ==
- Clancy, Flora (2009). The Monuments of Piedras Negras, an Ancient Maya City. University of New Mexico Press. ISBN 9780826344519.
- Fitzsimmons, James (2010). Death and the Classic Maya Kings. University of Texas Press. ISBN 9780292781986.
- Johnson, Scott (2013). Translating Maya Hieroglyphs. University of Oklahoma Press. ISBN 9780806189406.
- Martin, Simon; Grube, Nikolai (2000). Chronicle of the Maya Kings and Queens. Thames & Hudson. ISBN 9780500051030.
- Nelson, Zachary (2005). Settlement and Population at Piedras Negras, Guatemala (PDF) (PhD). The University of Pennsylvania.
- O'Neil, Megan (2014). Engaging Ancient Maya Sculpture at Piedras Negras, Guatemala. University of Oklahoma Press. ISBN 9780806188362.
- Pitts, Mark (2011). A Brief History of Piedras Negras as Told by the Ancient Maya: History Revealed in Maya Glyphs (PDF). Pre-Columbian Society of the University of Pennsylvania Museum.
- Sharer, Robert; Traxler, Loa (2005). The Ancient Maya. Stanford University Press. ISBN 9780804748179.
- Teufel, Stefanie (2004). Die Monumentalskulpturen Von Piedras Negras, Petén, Guatemala (PDF) (PhD) (in German). University of Bonn.
- Weeks, John M.; Hill, Jane A.; Golden, Charles, eds. (2005). Piedras Negras Archaeology, 1931–1939. University of Pennsylvania. ISBN 9781931707756.
- Zender, Marc (ed.). "Haʼ Kʼin Xook". Mesoweb Encyclopedia. Archived from the original on February 22, 2014.
