= Itzam Kʼan Ahk II =

Ajaw of Piedras Negras from 729 to 757

- Ajaw
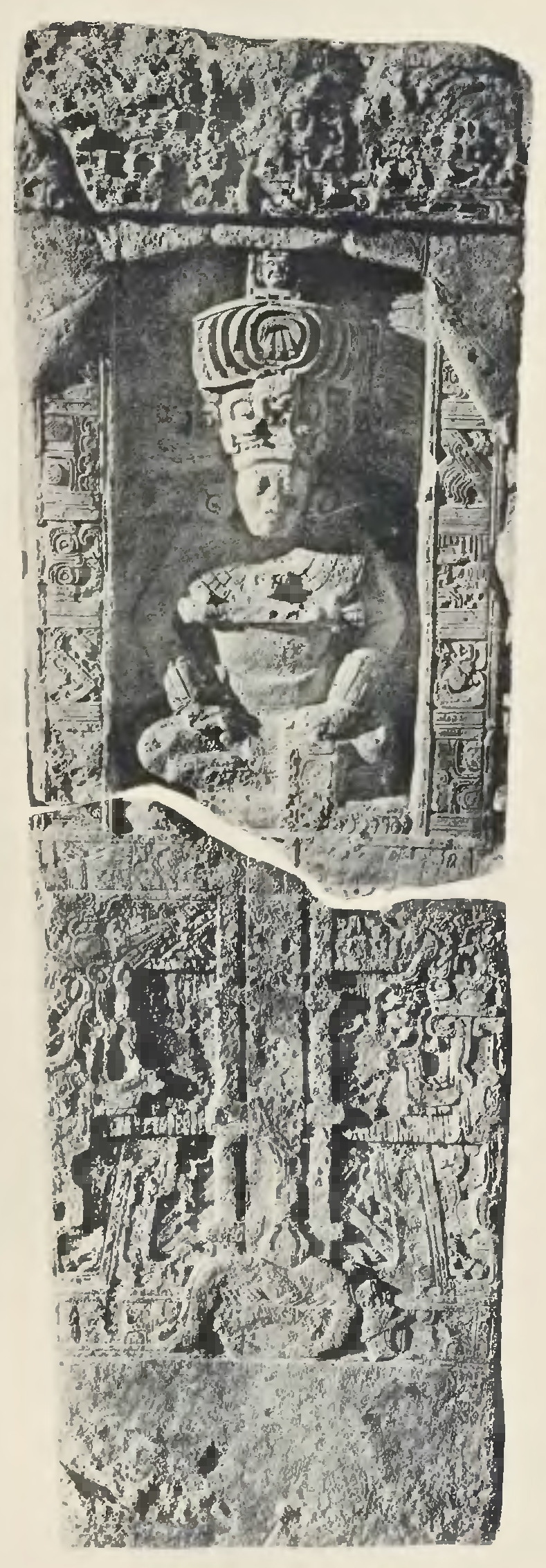
- Itzam Kʼan Ahk II's portrait on Stela 11

King of Piedras Negras
- Reign: November 9, 729 - November 26, 757
- Predecessor: Kʼinich Yoʼnal Ahk II
- Successor: Yoʼnal Ahk III
- Born: November 18, 701
- Died: November 26, 757 (aged 56); Piedras Negras
- Spouse: Lady Juntan Ahk (possibly)
- Issue: Yoʼnal Ahk III; Haʼ Kʼin Xook; Kʼinich Yat Ahk II
- Religion: Maya religion

Itzam Kʼan Ahk II (Mayan pronunciation: [itsam kʼan ahk], November 18, 701 – November 26, 757), also known as Ruler 4, was an ajaw of Piedras Negras, an ancient Maya settlement in Guatemala. He ruled during the Late Classic Period, from 729 to 757 AD. Itzam Kʼan Ahk II ascended to the throne following the death of Kʼinich Yoʼnal Ahk II. Itzam Kʼan Ahk II may have fathered the following three kings of Piedras Negras: Yoʼnal Ahk III, Haʼ Kʼin Xook, and Kʼinich Yat Ahk II. Following Itzam Kʼan Ahk II's demise, he was succeeded by Yoʼnal Ahk III in 757 AD. Itzam Kʼan Ahk II left several monuments, including stelae at Piedras Negras and a large mortuary temple now known as Pyramid O-13. In addition, the details of his life and his Kʼatun-jubilee were commemorated on Panel 3, raised by Kʼinich Yat Ahk II several years following Itzam Kʼan Ahk II's death.

== Biography ==
=== Lineage ===
Itzam Kʼan Ahk II, also known as Ruler 4, was born on November 18, 701 AD (9.13.9.14.15 7 Men 18 Kʼankʼin in the Long Count). Of the three extant references to Itzam Kʼan Ahk's birth, not a single one mentions his line of descent, suggesting that Itzam Kʼan Ahk was not Kʼinich Yoʼnal Ahk II's son. With this said, Simon Martin and Nikolai Grube note that in one carving, the ajaw is shown with a turtle ornament on his belt, suggesting that one of his ancestors had the word ahk ("turtle") in their name and was thus of royal blood. Additionally, Stela 40 shows what could be Itzam Kʼan Ahk's mother in Teotihuacano garb, suggesting that Itzam Kʼan Ahk was emphasizing maternal connections to Teotihuacan. Martin and Grube also note that this stela was erected exactly 83 Tzolkʼin, or about 59 years, following the death of Itzam Kʼan Ahk I (a former ajaw of Piedras Negras whose Itzam Kʼan Ahk II appropriated), which could suggest the existence of some "special link" between the two.

=== Reign ===
Panel 3 from Piedras Negras, which shows—among other things—Itzam Kʼan Ahk II lecturing visiting dignitaries on the superiority of Piedras Negras. Despite depicting Itzam Kʼan Ahk II, the panel was erected by Kʼinich Yat Ahk II.

Itzam Kʼan Ahk II ascended to power on November 9, 729 AD (9.14.18.3.13 7 Ben 16 Kʼankʼin). In 749 AD, the ajaw celebrated his one Kʼatun, an event that was attended by many dignitaries, including a bʼaah sajal ("first ruler") named Kʼan Moʼ Teʼ who had served Kʼinich Yoʼnal Ahk II. The events of this banquet were later recorded by the final ajaw of Piedras Negras, Kʼinich Yat Ahk II on Panel 3; this artifact shows Itzam Kʼan Ahk II lecturing the interim ruler of Yaxchilan, Yopaat Bahlam II, about Piedras Negras's local dominance. (This panel has lent support to the argument that during Itzam Kʼan Ahk II's rule, Piedras Negras had eclipsed Yaxchilan in power.) The Kʼatun celebration was followed by another event a few days later, at which Itzam Kʼan Ahk II "performed a 'descending macaw' dance" and then had a drink made from fermented cacao beans passed around to his guests.

Itzam Kʼan Ahk II likely engaged in war, as a pyrite disc found in his tomb depicts the severed head of a leader from Hix Witz. Houston et al. argue that Hix Witz was under Piedras Negras's control, largely based on the disk and because the Maya center is identified on Panel 7, erected earlier by Itzam Kʼan Ahk I, as a "tributary bearing plumes and textiles" to Piedras Negras.

=== Death ===
Itzam Kʼan Ahk II's reign was one marked by "hegemony over neighboring kingdoms". The ruler died on November 26, 757 AD (9.16.6.11.17 7 Kaban 0 Pax) and was buried three days later. According to Panel 3, the burial took place at the mythical "'mountain' of ho janaab witz", which in this context referred to Pyramid O-13. Itzam Kʼan Ahk II was succeeded by Yoʼnal Ahk III on March 10, 758 AD. Itzam Kʼan Ahk II's burial site was venerated by the succeeding kings of Piedras Negras, which has led some to hypothesize that Itzam Kʼan Ahk II produced a new ruling dynasty, and that the following three kings—Yoʼnal Ahk III, Haʼ Kʼin Xook, and Kʼinich Yat Ahk II—were his sons.

== Monuments ==
=== Stelae ===
Itzam Kʼan Ahk II erected at least five stelae: 9, 10, 11, 22, and 40, of which Stelae 9, 10, and 11 were raised in front of or near Structure J-3. Stela 11, constructed in August of 731 AD, is of the niche variety (meaning it depicts the ruler seated in a small hollow, or niche) and commemorates Itzam Kʼan Ahk II's ascension to power. This monument depicts the ajaw flanked by witnesses to the ceremonies explored on the stela itself. The expanse in front of the stone slab "designates the space ... as one of offering and supplication", given the depiction of human sacrifice near the monument's bottom. The monument was discovered by Teoberto Maler in two pieces on the ground; the front was well-preserved (even retaining some of its pigment), although the glyphs on the upper right were weathered. Sometime in the 1960s, looters broke up the fallen monument so they would have an easier time smuggling it out of the site. The top portion is currently housed in the Museum of Fine Arts, Houston (MFAH), whereas the bottom half is in a private collection in Switzerland.

Stela 9 had long been broken into thirds when it was discovered in 1899 by Maler. While these fragments had eroded slightly, the base was later found in situ by the University of Pennsylvania's University Museum. In the 1960s, looters carted off parts of the monument, namely a portion depicting a captive. Stela 10 is highly eroded, resulting in a loss of detail. In addition to this decay, the head ornament has presumably been lost. Stela 22 was dedicated on the East Group Plaza, located in front of Structure O-12, thereby "initiat[ing]" the East Group Plaza as a locus for sculpture and stelae. While previous stelae had faced other directions, Stela 22 faced northwest towards the site's acropolis, creating "a new axis of dialogue across the site."

Stela 40 contains the depiction of the aforementioned woman dressed in Teotihuacano garb; it shows Itzam Kʼan Ahk II dispersing something—hypothesized to be either blood or incense—into a "psychoduct" (that is, "a vent leading into a subplaza tomb"). Simon and Grube argue that "the connection between the living and the dead is manifested [on this stela] as a 'knotted cord' or breath which travels down to enter the nose of the deceased". The female on the stela, denoted only by an "upside down vase" glyph, is likely Itzam Kʼan Ahk II's mother; Pitts argues that the monument "offers an interesting vignette of Itzam Kʼan Ahk II and his loyalty to a female ancestor, probably his mother."

=== Pyramid O-13 ===
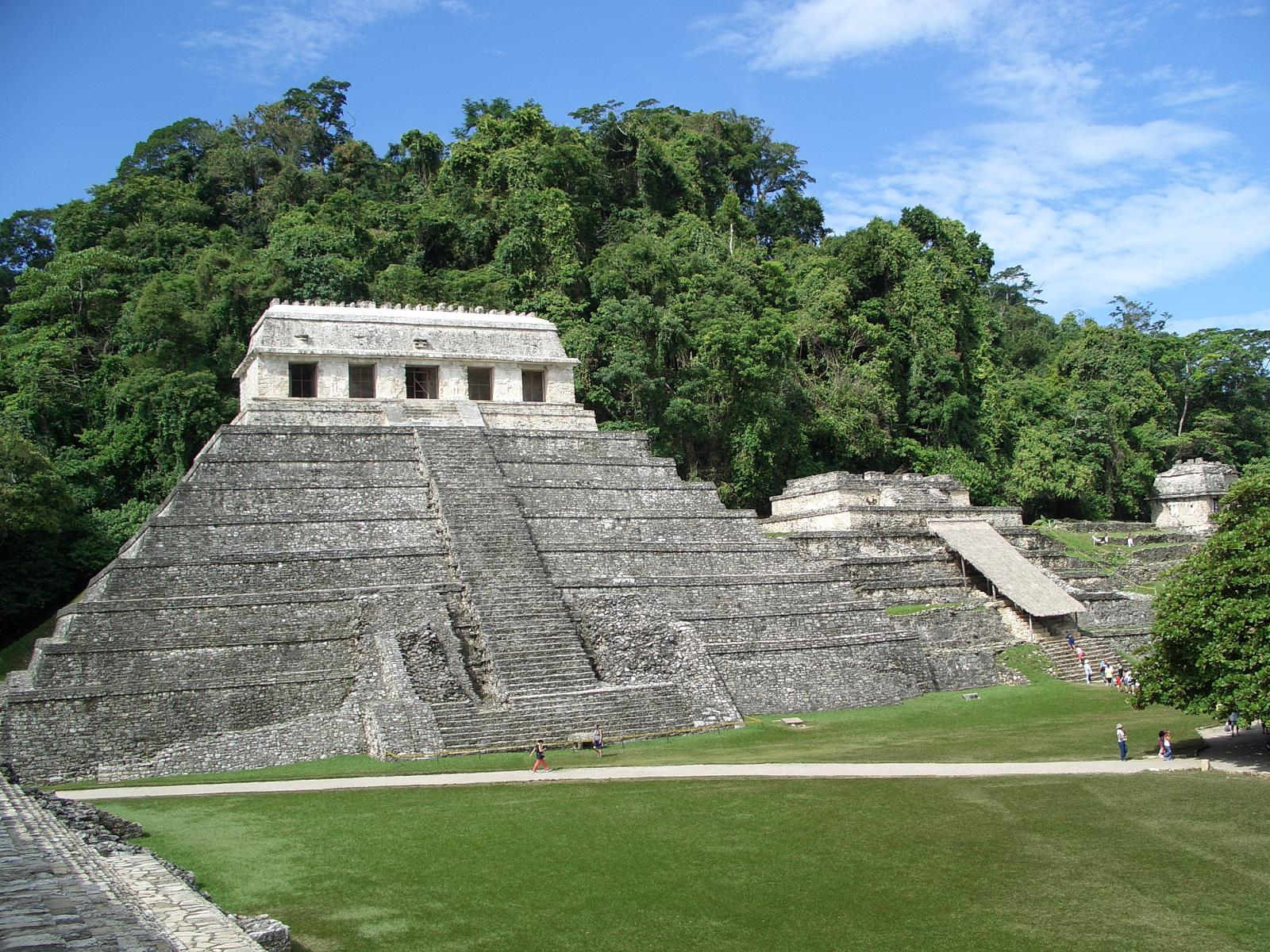
There are substantial similarities between Pyramid O-13 and the Temple of Inscriptions at Palenque (pictured), seeming to suggest a relationship between the two sites.

Pyramid O-13 is the name given to the hypothesized mortuary temple of Kʼinich Yat Ahk II. According to Stephen Houston et al., it was nearly "twice as large" as any of Piedras Negras's previous structures. The pyramid was modified substantially following Itzam Kʼan Ahk II's demise: Kʼinich Yat Ahk II, for instance, reset the older Panel 2 and installed Panel 1 and the now-famous Panel 3. Megan O'Neil argues that these changes were made in order for the ruling ajaw to "engag[e] with the past". Given that the last known rulers of Piedras Negras erected their stelae on or near this pyramid and all three of these leaders also revered the site as some sort of dynastic shrine, it is possible that they were Kʼinich Yat Ahk II's sons.

In 1997, Héctor Escobedo discovered a tomb (Burial 13) containing the bodies of an adult and two adolescents underneath the plaza floor at the front of the pyramid's frontal stairs. While some believe this to have been the resting place for Itzam Kʼan Ahk II, Stephen D. Houston cautions that this has not been conclusively proven. Among the artifacts found within (including pieces of jade and ornaments), archaeologists uncovered evidence that the tomb had been reentered after it was sealed: many bones were missing from the three bodies, and it appeared that the skeletons had been charred by fire sometime after their initial entombment. Scholars eventually concluded that this apparent desecration was actually part of a ritual described on Panel 3 called el naah umukil (the "house-burning at the burial"), and that it was carried out by Kʼinich Yat Ahk II.

In terms of architecture, the O-13 Pyramid and the Late Classic Temple of the Inscriptions at Palenque are very similar: both have the same number of substructure terraces, both pyramids' substructures have exactly five doors, and both were built into the sides of hills. Damien Marken and Kirk Straight, use this similarity—as well as inscriptions on stelae at Palenque—to argue that there existed some sort of relationship between Piedras Negras and Palenque.

== Bibliography ==
- Fitzsimmons, James (2010). Death and the Classic Maya Kings. University of Texas Press. ISBN 9780292781986.
- Houston, Stephan; et al. (1998). "Monumental Architecture at Piedras Negras, Guatemala: Time, History, and Meaning" (PDF). Mayab. 11: 40–56.
- Houston, Stephan; et al. (1999). "On the River of Ruins: Explorations at Piedras Negras, Guatemala". Mexicon. 20 (1): 16–22.
- Marken, Damien; Straight, Kirk (2007). Marken, Damien (ed.). Palenque: Recent Investigations at the Classic Maya Center. Rowman Altamira. ISBN 9780759108752.
- Martin, Simon; Grube, Nikolai (2000). Chronicle of the Maya Kings and Queens. Thames & Hudson. ISBN 9780500051030.
- O'Neil, Megan (2014). Engaging Ancient Maya Sculpture at Piedras Negras, Guatemala. University of Oklahoma Press. ISBN 9780806188362.
- Pitts, Mark (2011). A Brief History of Piedras Negras as Told by the Ancient Maya: History Revealed in Maya Glyphs (PDF). Pre-Columbian Society of the University of Pennsylvania Museum.
- Sharer, Robert; Traxler, Loa (2006). The Ancient Maya. Stanford University Press. ISBN 9780804748179.
- Witschey, Walter Robert Thurmond; Brown, Clifford (2012). Historical Dictionary of Mesoamerica. Scarecrow Press. ISBN 9780810871670.
- Zender, Marc (ed.). "Hix Witz". Mesoweb Encyclopedia. Archived from the original on October 6, 2016.
- Zender, Marc (ed.). "Piedras Negras Ruler 4". Mesoweb Encyclopedia. Archived from the original on April 2, 2012.
- Zender, Marc (ed.). "Piedras Negras Ruler 7". Mesoweb Encyclopedia. Archived from the original on October 6, 2016.
