= Parrot Chaak =

- Ajaw of La Mar
- Reign: AD 781–?
- Religion: Maya religion

Parrot Chaak was a ruler of La Mar, an ancient Maya settlement in the Mexican state of Chiapas.

== Biography ==
Parrot Chaak ascended to the throne of La Mar in 725 AD. An important mention of Parrot Chaak is found on Stela 12 at Piedras Negras. The monument details a series of "star wars", or wars planned to coincide with key astronomical events, that Piedras Negras carried out against its rival Pomona. Parrot Chaak is named as an ally to K'inich Yat Ahk II, the ajaw of Piedras Negras at the time. Parrot Chaak is also mentioned on Throne 1 at Piedras Negras, and is shown as a small child on Panel 3. Due to Parrot Chaak's name appearing on Throne 1's back—being "a literal supporter of the king"—Mayanist Stephen D. Houston supposed that it was possible that the artifact was commissioned by Parrot Chaak and given to K'inich Yat Ahk II as a gift.

== Bibliography ==
- Houston, Stephen, ed. (2004). Writing in Early Mesoamerica. In The First Writing: Script Invention as History and Process. Cambridge University Press. ISBN 9780521838610.
- Martin, Simon; Grube, Nikolai (2000). Chronicle of the Maya Kings and Queens. Thames & Hudson. ISBN 9780500051030.
