= Yoʼnal Ahk III =

- Ajaw
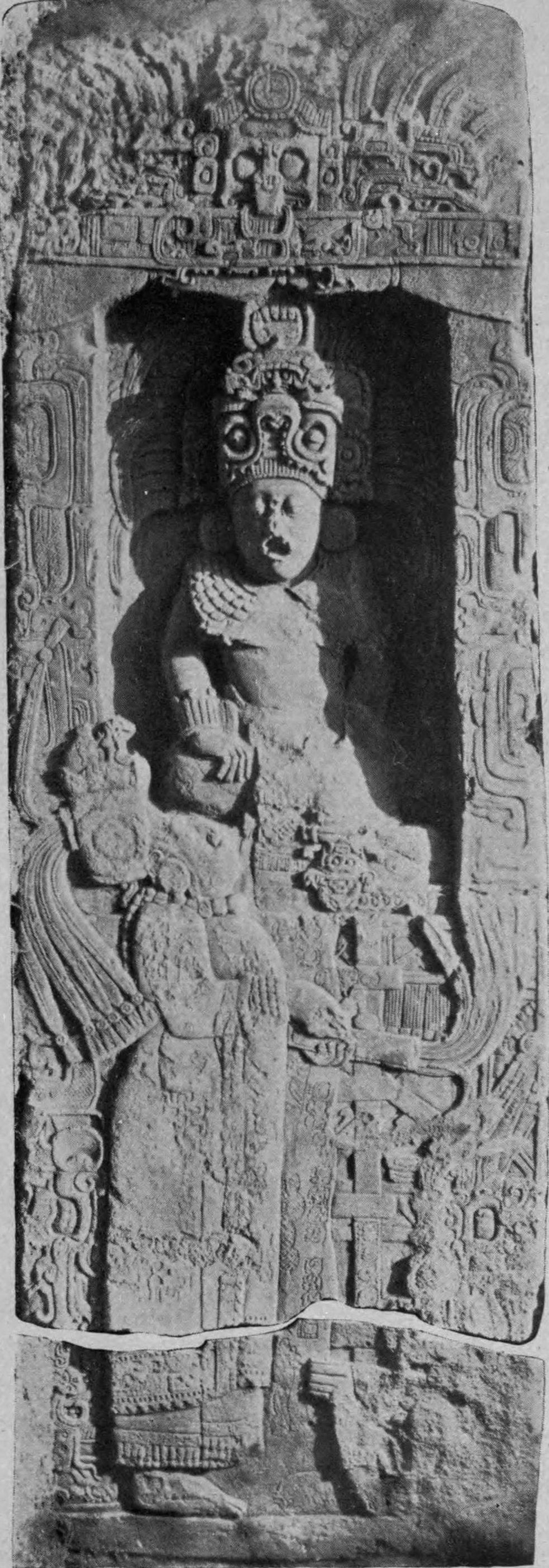
- Yoʼnal Ahk III's portrait on Stela 14

King of Piedras Negras
- Reign: 10 March 758 – 767
- Predecessor: Itzam Kʼan Ahk II
- Successor: Haʼ Kʼin Xook
- Born: Piedras Negras
- Died: 767; Piedras Negras
- Father: Itzam Kʼan Ahk II
- Religion: Maya religion

Yoʼnal Ahk III (Mayan pronunciation: [joːnal ahk]), also known as Ruler 5, was an ajaw of Piedras Negras, an ancient Maya settlement in Guatemala. He ruled during the Late Classic Period, from 758 to 767 AD. Yoʼnal Ahk III ascended to the throne upon the death of Itzam Kʼan Ahk II, who may have been Yoʼnal Ahk's father. He was succeeded by his probable brother, Haʼ Kʼin Xook in around 767 AD. Yoʼnal Ahk III left behind two surviving stelae at Piedras Negras, namely Stelae 14 and 16, the former of which has been called one of the finest niche stelae, according to Simon Martin and Nikolai Grube.

== Reign ==
Yoʼnal Ahk III, also known as Ruler 5, was likely the son of Itzam Kʼan Ahk II, based on Yoʼnal Ahk III's veneration of Itzam Kʼan Ahk II's mortuary temple. Yoʼnal Ahk III, whose name translates to "Black House Great Turtle", ascended to the throne of Piedras Negras on March 10, 758 AD (9.16.6.17.1 7 Imix 19 Wo in the Long Count), following the death of Itzam Kʼan Ahk II. Not much is known about either Yoʼnal Ahk III or his successor Haʼ Kʼin Xook, which led Flora Clancy to refer to both their reigns as "shadowy". James L. Fitzsimmons argues that, politically, Yoʼnal Ahk III was weaker than previous leaders of Piedras Negras, given that the ajaw erected only a handful of monuments and did not enforce his power beyond the existing Piedras Negras hegemony.

Monuments at El Cayo record that Yoʼnal Ahk III was involved in burial ceremonies for a sajal in 763 AD, although he was not involved in picking the leader's successor. It is also known that during his reign, a kʼiniʼ ajaw ("prince") of Piedras Negras, Tʼul Chiik, was captured by Yaxun Bʼalam IV of Yaxchilan; it has been hypothesized that Yoʼnal Ahk III's focus on smaller satellite kingdoms such as La Mar and Yax Niil was a tactic to build up a "base of support" to combat the growing threat that Yaxchilan posed. Yoʼnal Ahk III was succeeded by Haʼ Kʼin Xook, who was possibly his brother.

== Monuments ==
Only two monuments that Yoʼnal Ahk III erected survive today: Stelae 14 and 16. The first of these, Stela 14—which Simon Martin and Nikolai Grube called the "finest of all 'niche' monuments"—is the king's accession memorial. Raised c. AD 761, it depicts an effigy of the king in a small hollow (or "niche") scattering incense. The monument was placed on the lower part of Structure O-13, and according to O'Neil, the stela's "form, imagery, and location acknowledged and responded to Structure O-13's participation in the processional circuit" of the site. The front of the monument features not only the ajaw, but also his mother standing "as witness" to her son. Her positioning likely suggested that she has just arrived from the West Group Plaza via a sacred route. Stela 14 also includes the names of several sculptors and artists. These names are difficult to translate, since many are unique and not found in any other extant Mayan glyphic texts.

Stela 16 celebrates the accession of a local sajal (or lesser Maya leader) at the nearby satellite kingdom of La Mar. This stela caused Tatiana Proskouriakoff to misidentify the sixth ajaw of Piedras Negras as this sajal, instead of Haʼ Kʼin Xook. The uniqueness of a La Mar ruler being celebrated on a Piedras Negras stela seems to signify that La Mar had, at the time of Yoʼnal Ahk III and possibly earlier, attained a certain degree of importance "within the Piedras Negras hegemony". The front of the stela is heavily weathered, but Megan O'Neil argues it likely featured a carving of Yoʼnal Ahk III, based on comparisons with other stelae at Piedras Negras, like Stelae 6 and 11.

== Bibliography ==
- Clancy, Flora (2009). The Monuments of Piedras Negras, an Ancient Maya City. University of New Mexico Press. ISBN 9780826344519.
- Fitzsimmons, James (2010). Death and the Classic Maya Kings. University of Texas Press. ISBN 9780292781986.
- Martin, Simon; Grube, Nikolai (2000). Chronicle of the Maya Kings and Queens. Thames & Hudson. ISBN 9780500051030.
- O'Neil, Megan (2014). Engaging Ancient Maya Sculpture at Piedras Negras, Guatemala. University of Oklahoma Press. ISBN 9780806188362.
- Pitts, Mark (2011). A Brief History of Piedras Negras as Told by the Ancient Maya: History Revealed in Maya Glyphs (PDF). Pre-Columbian Society of the University of Pennsylvania Museum.
- Sharer, Robert; Traxler, Loa (2005). The Ancient Maya. Stanford University Press. ISBN 9780804748179.
- Witschey, Walter Robert Thurmond; Brown, Clifford (2012). Historical Dictionary of Mesoamerica. Scarecrow Press. ISBN 9780810871670.
- Zender, Marc (ed.). "Yoʼnal Ahk III". Mesoweb Encyclopedia. Archived from the original on August 8, 2014.
