= Ijik Xajlel =

Mayan arachaelogical site in Mexico

- Location within Mexico Location within Chiapas
- Type: Ancient Maya site
- Periods: Classic
- Cultures: Maya civilization
- Location: Mexico
- Region: Usumacinta

History
- Abandoned: 9th century AD

Site notes
- Architectural style: Usumacinta

Ijik Xajlel is an archaeological Maya site located on the bank of the Usumacinta River in the state of Chiapas, Mexico. It was a Maya settlement and port developed between the Middle and Late Classic period, built in a strategic geographical location with access to a beach where the river is slower which made easier the navigation with canoes and crossing to the other side of the river and it was part of an ancient route that connected sites on both sides of the Usumacinta Basin. In the archaeological site of Ijik Xajlel around 10 structures and platforms have been identified, ceramic representations dating from the late Classic period have also been found.

== Toponym ==
The name Ijik Xajlel means "Black Stone" in the Ch'ol language as a reference to a natural mound of dark-colored stones on the Usumacinta River right where the archaeological site is located.

== Architecture ==
At least 10 stone structures and platforms have been found at Ijik Xajlel, most of them are extensive, although the rest of the site remains buried and covered in vegetation. The largest structures at the site are built following the traditional orientation of the Classic Maya Period buildings of the Usumacinta region, while six smaller structures are oriented toward the north. In one of the platforms, a late classic style ceramic spindle whorl was found engraved with the representation of a bird.

== History ==
Ijik Xajlel was a pre-Columbian Maya settlement in the Usumacinta region occupied during the Classic period of the Maya civilization. Due to its location on the banks of the Usumacinta River, it had a significant geopolitical role and developed mainly as a crossing port to the other side of the river. The site was built on the river bank in a zone where the water is slower, which made navigation safer for the ancient Maya. The site has access to a beach that was conditioned as a landing stage for canoes that were used to navigate the river. Ijik Xajlel alongside the archaeological site of Arroyo Jerusalén located 1 km to the south, a pre-Hispanic travel road that connected sites like La Mar and Budsilha with Piedras Negras, these being the ports to cross the Usumacinta, on the other side of the river in front of Ijik Xajlel there is a canyon that leads directly to Piedras Negras, being identified as one of the main land routes used during the classic period to reach that city.
