= GigaMesh Software Framework =

Software framework for processing and analyzing 3D mesh data

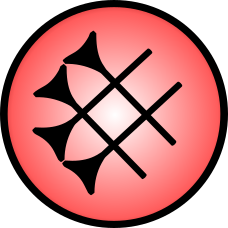

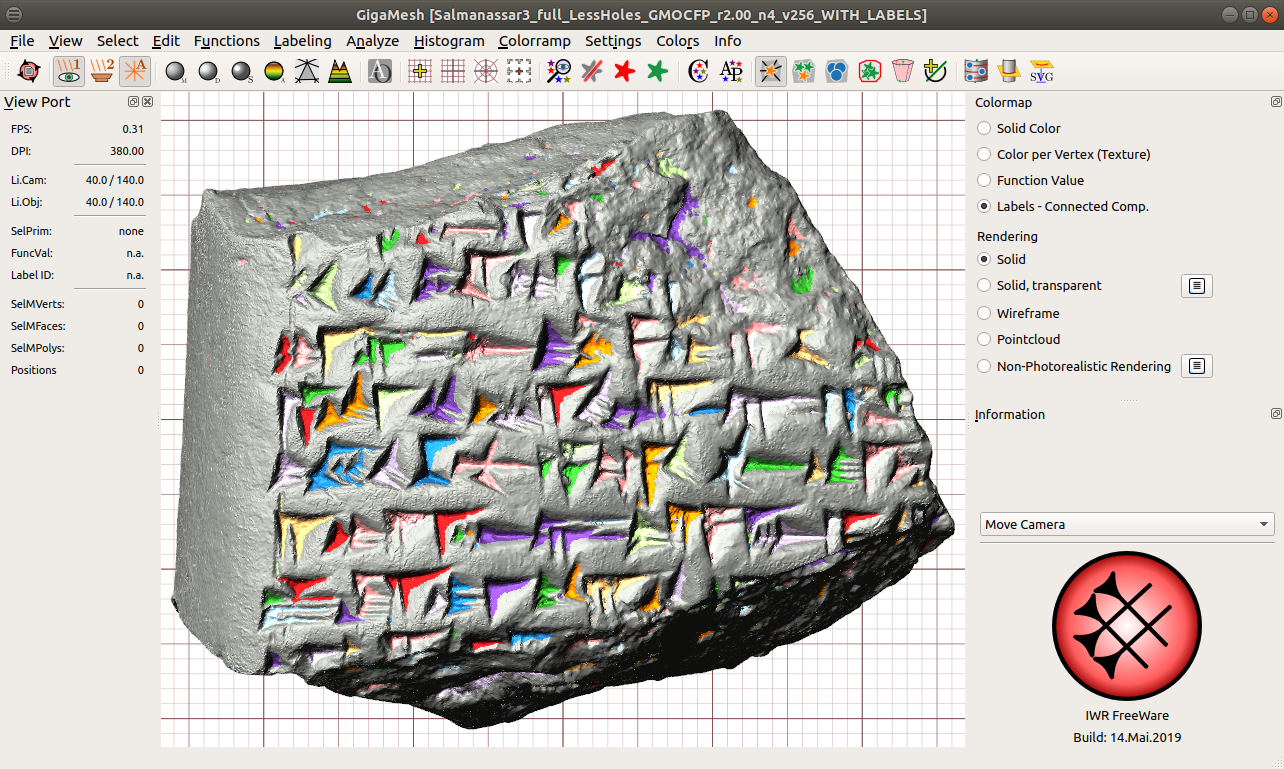
- Developers: since 2021: AG eHumanities & FCGLab, Institut for Computer Science, MLU Halle-Wittenberg; 2009-2020 Forensic Computational Geometry Laboratory (FCGL), IWR, Heidelberg University
- Stable release: v.240221 / 21 February 2024; 2 years ago
- Written in: C++
- Operating system: Linux, Windows 10
- Available in: 1 languages
- List of languages English
- Type: Graphics software
- License: GNU General Public License
- Website: https://gigamesh.eu
- Repository: https://gitlab.com/fcgl/GigaMesh.git

The GigaMesh Software Framework is a free and open-source software for display, editing and visualization of 3D-data typically acquired with structured light or structure from motion.

It provides numerous functions for analysis of archaeological objects like cuneiform tablets, ceramics or converted LiDAR data. Typically applications are unwrappings (or rollouts), profile cuts (or cross sections) as well as visualizations of distances and curvature, which can be exported as raster graphics or vector graphics.

The retrieval of text in 3D like damaged cuneiform tablets or weathered medieval headstones using multi-scale integral invariant (MSII) filtering is a core function of the software. Furthermore, small or faint surface details like fingerprints can be visualized. The polygonal meshes of the 3D-models can be inspected, cleaned and repaired to provide optimal filtering results. The repaired datasets are suitable for 3D printing and for digital publishing in a dataverse.

== Name and logo ==
The name "GigaMesh" refers to the processing of large 3D-datasets and relates intentionally to the mythical Sumerian king Gilgamesh and his heroic epic described on a set of clay tablets. The central element of the logo is the cuneiform sign 𒆜 (kaskal) meaning street or road junction, which symbolizes the intersection of the humanities and computer science. The surrounding circle refers to the integral invariant computation using a spherical domain. The red color is derived from carmine, the color used by the Heidelberg University, where GigaMesh is developed.

== Development and application in research projects ==
The development began in 2009 and was inspired by the edition project Keilschrifttexte aus Assur literarischen Inhalts (KAL, cuneiform texts with literary content) of the Heidelberg Academy of Sciences and Humanities. In parallel it was applied within the Austrian Corpus Vasorum Antiquorum of the Austrian Academy of Sciences for documentation of red-figure pottery. Current projects are funded by the DFG and the BMBF for contextualization and analysis of seals and sealings of the Corpus der minoischen und mykenischen Siegel, where Thin Plate Splines are used for comparing sealings. Analog to the developments for processing cuneiform tablets there are further approaches for adaption of the combined Computer Vision and Machine Learning methods for other Scripts in 3D. An example is the application within the Text Database and Dictionary of Classic Mayan.

In 2017 GigaMesh was tested by the DAI at an excavation in Guadalupe, near Trujillo, Honduras for immediate visualization of in-situ acquired findings with different 3D-scanners including a comparison with manual drawings. Since then GigaMesh is permanently used by the excavation team, their feedback led to numerous changes to the GUI, improving the user experience (UX). Additionally online tutorials are published having a focus on tasks required to compile excavation reports.

The Scanning for Syria (SfS) project of the Leiden University used GigaMesh in 2018 for 3D reconstruction of molds of tablets lost in ar-Raqqa, Syria based on Micro-CT-scans. As a follow-up project the TU Delft acquired further Micro-CT-scans for virtually extracting clay tablets still wrapped into clay envelopes, which are unopened for thousands of years. In May 2020 the SfS project won the European Union Prize for Cultural Heritage of the Europa Nostra in the category research.

A first version (190416) for Windows was released in preparation for presentations about new functions shown at the international CAA 2019.

The command line interface of GigaMesh is well suited to process large amounts of 3D-measurement data within repositories. This was demonstrated with almost 2.000 cuneiform tablets of the Hilprecht Collection of the Jena University, which were processed and digitally published as benchmarkdatabase (HeiCuBeDa) for machine learning as well as database of images including 3D- and meta-data (HeiCu3Da) using CC BY licenses. A baseline for period classification of tablets was established using a Geometric Neural Network being a Convolutional Neural Network typically used for 3D-datasets. In 2023, an extension of the dataset was published containing extracted images of cuneiform characters, cuneiform lines and individual annotated cuneiform characters. The annotations are made available together with the renderings with metadata as CSV and a knowledge graph (RDF). These developments were created in the context of the DFG project "Digital Edition of Cuneiform Texts from Haft Tappeh" in Mainz. The acronym MaiCuBeDa is derived from the project location. This provided the first results for the localization of cuneiform characters and their wedges, which show that MSII rendering improves the recognition quality for photos.

The Louvre showed GigaMesh based rollouts of an Aryballos from the collection of the KFU Graz representing the use of digital methods for research on pottery of ancient Greece within the CVA project, which had its 100th anniversary in 2019. Renderings of the rollouts were on display in the second half of 2019 in the display case named L’ère du numèrique et de l’imagerie scientifique (the digital era and scientific imaging).

Version 191219 supports Texture maps common for 3D-data captured using photogrammetry. This allows processing and in particular unwrapping of objects acquired with Structure-from-Motion widely used for documentation of Cultural Heritage and in archaeology.

The Nara National Research Institute for Cultural Properties in Japan adapted GigaMesh for documentation and rollouts of vessels and published a tutorial, which was used to implement the workflow for ceramics of the Jōmon period within the Togariishi Museum of Jōmon Archaeology.

In April 2020 the source code was published on GitLab and the license changed from freeware to the GPL. Version 200529 allows for the first time to apply the MSII filter using the graphical user interface to visualize the smallest details like fingerprints. The DFG funded edition of texts from Haft Tepe project is using MSII filtered renderings of tablets in the so-called fat-cross arrangement of side views.

GigaMesh is increasingly being used in areas that have methodological overlap with archaeology, such as geoengineering for the analysis of seashells.

=== File formats and research data infrastructures ===
Primarily the Polygon File Format is supported and used to store additional information from the processing. This is not possible with the — additionally supported — Wavefront OBJ due to its specification. It is possible to export meshes in the glTF fileformat. The marking of interpolated points and triangles by filling voids in the triangular grid represents meta-information to be captured, e.g. in the context of the National Research Data Infrastructure (NFDI) in Germany. Other metadata such as inventory numbers, material, and hyperlinks or digital object identifiers (DOIs) can be captured. In addition, there is the ability to calculate topological metrics that describe the quality of a 3D measurement dataset.

== See also ==
- gigamesh.eu includes tutorials, publications and downloads
- TACUME – Tools for Archaeology and Cuneiform Studies in the Modern Era GitLab group with related software like:
- Cuneur – Keilschrift beschriften a GitLab pages based tool to create annotations on 3D-models and stacks of images of cuneiform tablets
