= Zapote Bobal =

Archaeological site in Petén, Guatemala

Coordinates: 17.3066°N 90.3064°W

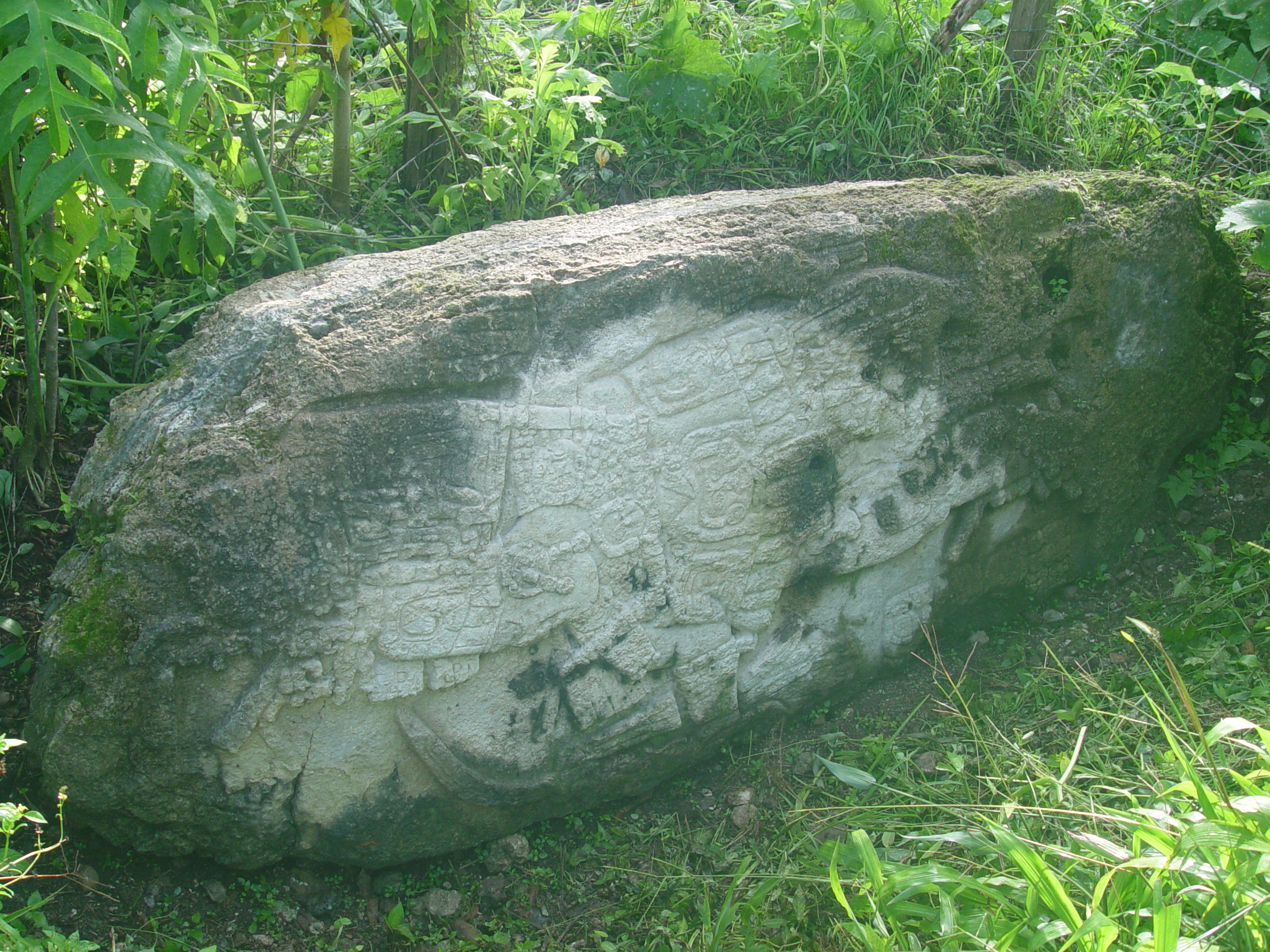
Stela 12, Zapote Bobal

Zapote Bobal is the modern name for a pre-Columbian Maya archaeological site located south of the San Pedro Martir river in the Petén department of Guatemala. The name Zapote Bobal was coined by archaeologist Ian Graham, who discovered the site in the 1970s. It refers to the large number of Zapote Bobo (Pachira aquatica) trees, which grow near abundant sources of water in the Petén Basin. The site languished in archaeological obscurity until 2003, when epigrapher David Stuart connected the archaeological site of Zapote Bobal with a name repeatedly mentioned in the inscriptions of sites like Piedras Negras and Yaxchilan. That name was the toponym Hix Witz, or "Jaguar Hill" Scholars had recognized this name for over 20 years, and its connection to a real place prompted the creation of an archaeological project at Zapote Bobal in 2003, the Proyecto Peten Noroccidente (PNO). It is currently directed by James Fitzsimmons (Middlebury College) and Laura Gamez (University of Pittsburgh).

== Archaeology and architecture ==
Built atop a leveled natural hill 1 kilometer long and 700 meters wide, the center of the site is characterized by a royal palace, several temple-pyramids, and elite residences. The site is noteworthy for its numerous monuments to the ancient Maya kings. Immediately outside this center are several mound groups, including one characterized by a pyramid 35 meters in height.

Although the general scale of construction at Zapote Bobal is quite large and would normally be characteristic of a long-lived ancient Maya center, it is clear that the city center was occupied for a brief period of time. The royal dynasty at Zapote Bobal seems to have flourished for only 200 years, disintegrating by A.D. 800. This is in marked contrast to most ancient Maya sites of the Classic Period (A.D. 200-900), which typically had long histories of occupation prior leading to the general collapse of Maya civilization in the 9th century.

Recent archaeological evidence suggests that the peripheral areas of Zapote Bobal were densely occupied before the site’s fluorescence and the construction of its central monumental core. Over 400 buildings have been discovered within a radius of 2.5 kilometers from the city center. According to Fitzsimmons, there was an “imposition of a relatively new center upon an older sociopolitical landscape.” Compounding this with the site's short occupational history suggests a rapid program of construction and raises questions about how and why the central core of Zapote Bobal was built in the first place. The fact that the surrounding area was previously occupied "calls to mind dynastic splits or other social upheavals at Late Classic sites elsewhere in the Maya lowlands, particularly those based in the Petexbatún."

== Connections ==
For the majority of the Late Classic (AD 600-900), Zapote Bobal was the center of a kingdom that included the sites of Pajaral and (probably) La Joyanca. It was ruled by a succession of kings, the majority of which bore variations on the name Chan Ahk ("Sky/Serpent Turtle"). Unlike the majority of Late Classic kings, who bear the title k'uhul ajaw or "holy lord" in their names (a title indicating the relative divinity of the ruler), the kings of Zapote Bobal only used ajaw. It is unclear why this was the case, although it is possible that, as a "new" center under military and diplomatic pressure from established sites, the lords of Zapote Bobal did not have the power (real or perceived) to add k'uhul to their list of accomplishments on Maya stelae.

Zapote Bobal seems to have had ties to several major sites in the ancient Maya world. Some of these relationships are transparent, while others remain obscure. Sites like Piedras Negras and Yaxchilan, for example, mention capturing, killing, and even marrying the nobility at Zapote Bobal. But not all images of Zapote Bobal are negative: King B'alaj Chan K'awiil of Dos Pilas, a major site in the Petexbatún river drainage, appears to have fled to Zapote Bobal for temporary refuge in the 8th century. He may have even taken part in the building of several monuments there, as the dates of his arrival and the largest monumental program at Zapote Bobal seem to coincide. The greatest influence on this nascent dynasty, however, may have been its northern neighbor, El Perú: some research at Zapote Bobal suggests a connection between these two ancient Maya cities.

== Future research ==
The picture of Zapote Bobal as reflected in Maya hieroglyphs and archaeology is one of a "crossroads" city, one that had to frequently negotiate with—and probably fend off—several more powerful kingdoms. Such constant pressure was likely a factor in the rapid rise and fall of its royal dynasty. The ongoing archaeology at Zapote Bobal, as well as the decipherment of its royal inscriptions, will doubtless shed light on these issues.
