= Hilprecht Collection =

Collection of antiquities from Babylonia

Coordinates: 50°55′46.8″N 11°35′22.1″E

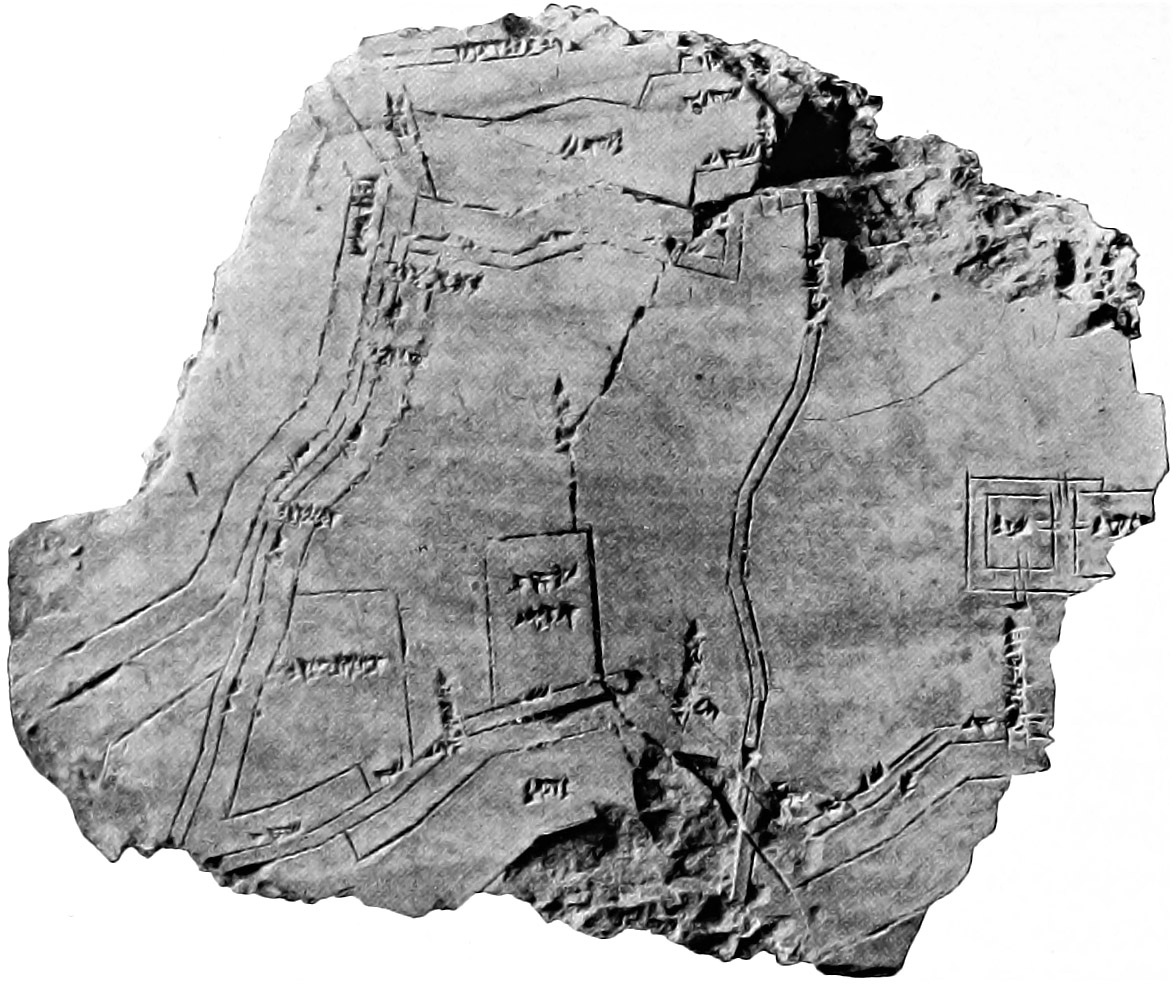
The Map of Nippur, one of the collection's most prominent exhibits

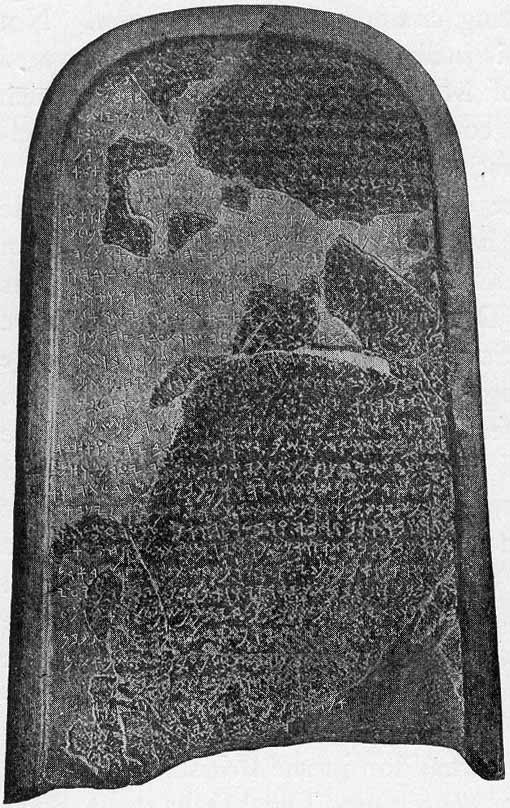
Image of a Mesha Stele from the Hilprecht Collection

The Hilprecht Collection (also known as the Cuneiform Collection), is a private collection of archaeological artifacts from Western Asia housed at the Institute for Languages and Cultures of the Near East at the Friedrich Schiller University Jena. The collection comprises around 3,300 artifacts, including about 3,000 cuneiform texts spanning nearly 3,000 years and representing almost all periods and genres.

The collection primarily derives from the estate of the German-American Assyriologist and archaeologist Hermann Volrath Hilprecht. Its most famous artifact is the Map of Nippur, dating to the mid-2nd millennium BCE, considered the oldest known city map in human history. After the Vorderasiatisches Museum in Berlin, the Hilprecht Collection is the most extensive of its kind in Germany.

== History ==
A large portion of the artifacts comes from Hilprecht’s excavation campaigns. In 1889, Hilprecht—then a professor of Assyriology in Philadelphia—participated in the first excavations at Nippur, one of the major cities of ancient Mesopotamia (present-day Iraq). In the following years, he served on the scientific committee in Philadelphia and took part in two further excavations in Nippur as well as one in Constantinople. Between 1898 and 1900, he led the fourth excavation expedition to Nippur.

After Hilprecht’s death in 1925, the collection was bequeathed to Friedrich Schiller University Jena, in accordance with his last will, and named the "Frau Professor Hilprecht Collection of Babylonian Antiquities" in memory of his first wife. It was later renamed to "Frau Professor Hilprecht Sammlung Babylonischer Altertümer" and subsequently to "Hilprecht Collection of Babylonian Antiquities."

In 1932/33, the collection was expanded with Hilprecht’s literary estate, which came from his sister. This also included his rollouts of ancient Near Eastern seals and Islamic faience tiles.

Additional items were later added to the collection. Botanist Heinrich Carl Haussknecht contributed artifacts he had acquired during his travels. The Orientalist Arthur Ungnad also donated further pieces.

== Digitization using imaging techniques ==
Side views in a “fat cross” representation of the 3D model of tablet HS 1445, featuring part of the Epic of Gilgamesh

Initial attempts at digitizing the collection began in the mid-1990s. Holograms of tablets were created, and cuneiform wedges were analyzed using neural networks. These efforts were conducted by the Laboratory for Biophysics at the Institute for Experimental Audiology, University of Münster, in collaboration with the Laboratory for Coherent Optics at Humboldt University, Berlin, and were supervised by the Assyriologist Walter Sommerfeld.

In 1999–2000, a portion of the collection—specifically the oldest artifacts from the 4th–3rd millennium BCE—was digitized using a flatbed scanner. These images were made publicly available via the Cuneiform Digital Library Initiative (CDLI). Participating institutions included the University of California, Los Angeles, the University of Oxford, and the Max Planck Institute for the History of Science.

In a second project launched in 2009, a 3D scanner was used to take advantage of technological advances. The project was led by Manfred Krebernik, professor of Ancient Near Eastern Studies at FSU Jena and curator of the collection, together with Peter Damerow from the MPI for the History of Science. The MPI provided a high-resolution 3D scanner for the digitization of about 3,000 objects. As of June 2018, around 2,500 objects had been captured in 3D, with nearly 2,000 available via the Hilprecht Archive Online under a CC BY license—until the server was shut down in 2024. The goal was to make the collection publicly accessible after the project's conclusion, which ultimately did not happen.

=== Freely accessible and usable 3D models in Heidelberg ===
The 1,977 available 3D models were cleaned, oriented, and filtered using the GigaMesh Software Framework and enhanced with high-contrast textures. Normalized, high-resolution side views were rendered as PNG files and compiled into "fat cross" PDFs. Additional metadata such as dimensions, surface area, and volume were calculated. For 707 entries, matches were automatically found in the CDLI and used to supplement metadata. All processed tablets and their visualizations are available as a benchmark dataset (HeiCuBeDa) and as an image and metadata-rich 3D database (HeiCu3Da). Based on these datasets, the Mainz Cuneiform Benchmark Dataset for the Hilprecht Collection (MaiCuBeDa) was created, containing cuneiform signs from the 3D renderings in HeiCuBeDa. Inspired by this, further open datasets with annotations are being developed.
