= El Porvenir (Maya site) =

Archaeological site in Petén, Guatemala

El Porvenir is the modern name for a ruined city of the pre-Columbian Maya civilization located in the Petén department of Guatemala. Ron Canter, in his paper "The Usumacinta River Portages in the Maya Classical Period" argues that El Porvenir was the first point at which the ancient Maya portaged, or carried water craft over land, to avoid the unnavigable portions of the Usumacinta River. A fragment of stone found at the site and aptly called the "El Porvenir Fragment" was also discovered that bore the name of Ha' K'in Xook, the sixth ajaw (leader or ruler) of Piedras Negras, suggesting a connection to the site.
