= Hermann Volrath Hilprecht =

German-American Assyriologist (1859–1925)

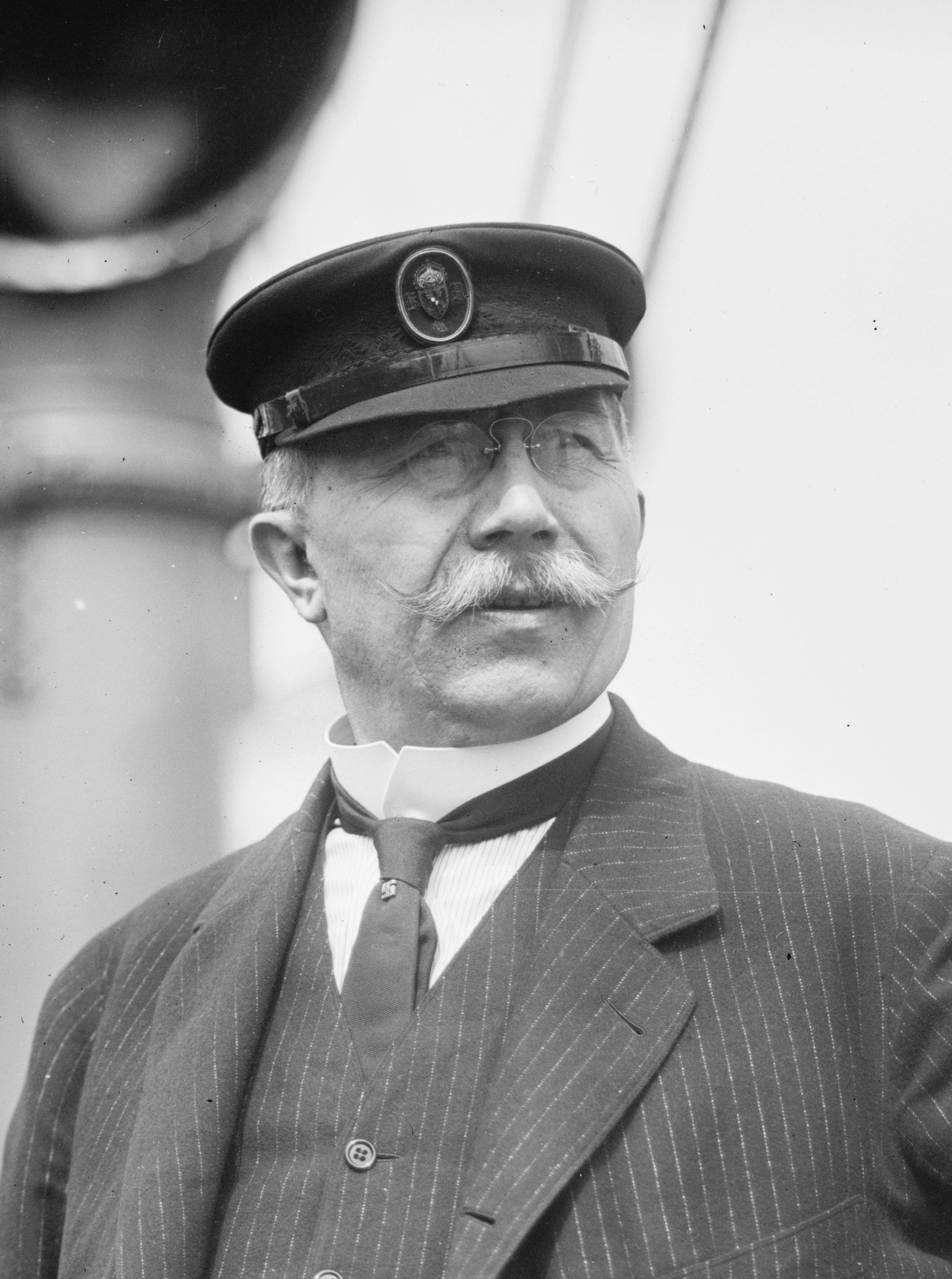
- Hilprecht in 1900
- Born: July 28, 1859; Hohenerxleben, Kingdom of Prussia (now Staßfurt, Germany)
- Died: March 19, 1925 (aged 65); Philadelphia, Pennsylvania, U.S.
- Spouse(s): Ida Haufe (m. 1886; died 1902) Salli Robinson (m. 1903)

Academic background
- Education: Leipzig University

Hermann Volrath Hilprecht (July 28, 1859 – March 19, 1925) was a German-American Assyriologist and archeologist.

== Biography ==
Hermann Volrath Hilprecht was born in 1859 at Hohenerxleben (now a part of Staßfurt), Kingdom of Prussia, to Emilie (née Wielepp) and Robert Hilprecht. He graduated from Herzogliches Gymnasium at Bernburg in 1880. Afterwards he went on to the University of Leipzig where he studied theology, philology, and law. In 1882, he spent two months in the British Museum studying cuneiform literature. He received his Ph.D. from Leipzig in 1883. He then spent two years in Switzerland for his health. From 1885 to 1886 he became an instructor in Old Testament theology at the University of Erlangen. In 1886, he left for the United States, where he became linguistic editor of the Sunday-School Times, and a professor of Assyrian at the University of Pennsylvania. Also in 1886, he was elected as a member of the American Philosophical Society. The next year, 1887, he also became curator for the Semitic department of the University of Pennsylvania's museum. In 1894, Hilprecht took a D.D. degree from the University of Pennsylvania, and an LL.D. from Princeton in 1896.

As second Assyriologist in charge, he participated in the first campaign of excavations at Nippur (modern Nuffar, Iraq) in 1889. In the following two campaigns he was a member of the scientific committee in Philadelphia and eventually travelled to Constantinople to examine the portable finds and arrange the separation/acquisition of duplicate pieces for the newly constructed University of Pennsylvania Museum of Archaeology and Anthropology in Philadelphia. He also rearranged the Imperial Ottoman Museum for which the director Osman Hamdi Bey showed his gratitude with a favorable separation of the findings.

During the fourth and last campaign he was coordinating director of the expedition, sending out John Henry Haynes accompanied by his wife Cassandria as field director from 1898-1900 (later in 1899 efforts were increased by sending out two young architects H. V. Geere and C. S. Fisher). Hilprecht himself overtook the responsibility of the whole excavation for the last part of this campaign from March 1 until May 11, 1900.

Afterwards he undertook the editing of the publications programme of the "Babylonian Expedition of the University of Pennsylvania"(=BE). This publication series incorporated also quantities of bought cuneiform tablets, acquired in Baghdad from the antiquities dealers which tried to undermine the efforts of continuing the US excavations.

With announcing the discovery of the Temple Library of Nippur after finishing the fourth campaign, some other team members including the former expedition director John Punnett Peters built a strong opposition against Hilprecht who claimed "the cream" of nearly every important discovery as his work. Some American orientalists joined in, developing into the Peters–Hilprecht controversy. Peters officially charged Hilprecht with inaccuracies and deception in relation to his Nippur publications and lectures. Hilprecht put the entire matter in the hands of the board of the University of Pennsylvania, which conducted an official examination, similar to a modern court case, with all sides submitting their arguments and evidences. Hilprecht was fully cleared of the accusations brought against him and published full documentation of the hearings and all documents related to it in the publication The So-Called Peters–Hillprecht Controversy. This fierce controversy fought in newspapers and even lectures prevented most of the research of the acquired material for the next years.

After his resignation in 1911 of which (besides the Peters–Hilprecht controversy) the main reason was the breakup of his bureau late in 1911. The numbered boxes were opened, confused and burned (including the files of the archeological context). After this the publication series were changed to the "Publications of the Babylonian Section" (=PBS). Afterwards he returned to the United States, where he became a citizen.

He died in Philadelphia in 1925. After his death his second wife, according to H. V. Hilprechts last will, handed over his collection of Babylonian antiquities to the University of Jena founding the "Frau Professor Hilprecht Collection of Babylonian Antiquities" (eventually Germanized under the regime of the Nazis in "Frau Professor Hilprecht Sammlung Babylonischer Altertümer") in remembrance of his first wife. It incorporates more than 2000 cuneiform tablets and pieces and the personal archive of him. One of the most recognized pieces is the "city map of Nippur" one of the earliest city maps recovered presumably from the late Kassite period.

== Works ==
He is known among Assyriologists by his Freibrief Nebukadnezars I (Leipzig, 1883). In the spring of 1887, he delivered, in the chapel of the University of Pennsylvania, a course of lectures on "The Family and Civil Life of the Egyptians," "The Most Flourishing Period of Egyptian Literature," and "Egypt in the Time of Israel's Sojourn." His other literary works consist of contributions to Luthardt's Theologisches Literaturblatt (Leipzig), and to other periodicals.

== Other sources ==
- Works of Hermann Hilprecht at Google Books
