= Naachtun =

Pre-Columbian Mayan archaeological site in Guatemala

Coordinates: 17°47′52″N 89°44′25″W

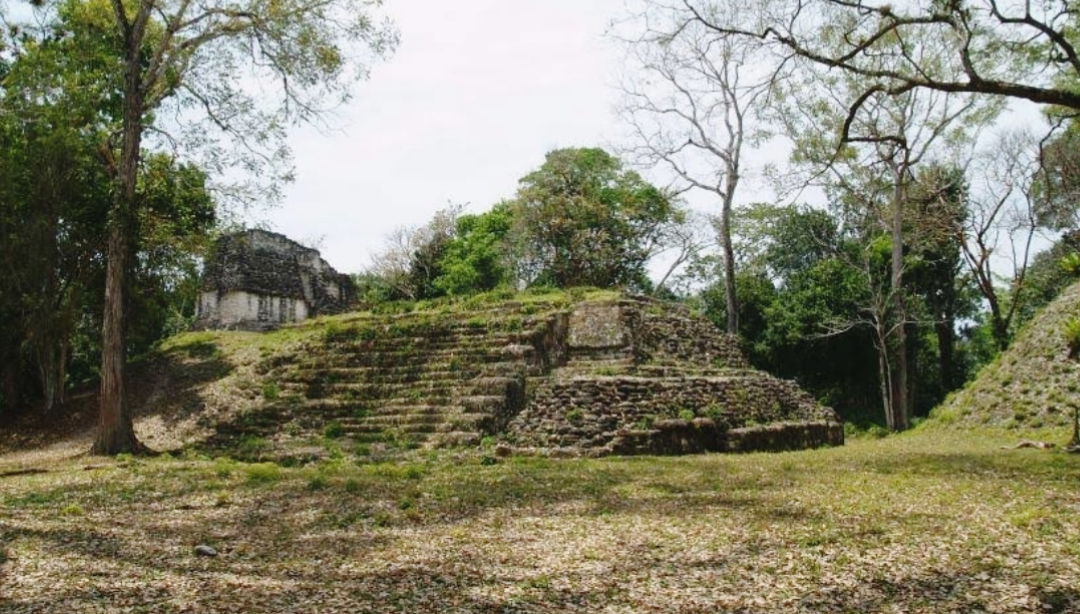
Photo of the architectural site

Naachtun is an archaeological site of the pre-Columbian Maya civilization, situated at the northeastern perimeter of the Mirador Basin region in the southern Maya lowlands, now in the modern-day Department of El Petén, northern Guatemala. Naachtun was a major center of the region by the late Formative (or Pre-Classic) Period, and was one of the few Formative Period Mirador Basin centers which continued to flourish into the succeeding Classic period.

Situated in one of the areas most remote from contemporary settlements, the site was first rediscovered and documented in 1922 by the American archaeologist and Mayanist scholar, Sylvanus Morley. The name Naachtun was given to the site by Morley, taken from a Mayan construction glossed as "distant stones", in recognition of its remoteness. Its ancient name was Masuul, and it was in the middle of the Classic Maya cities. The site is being investigated by the University of Calgary, where they have found that the site served as a link between Tikal and Calakmul, that were the superpowers in the Classic, and in constant wars between them, perhaps using Massul as a "Neutral Talk Place". A carved stela with the "Lady of Tikal" has been recently found there.

== History ==
Chronological Sequence of Naachtun

Occupational Phase	Year	Corresponding Period
Muuch	830 CE - 950/1000	Terminal Classic
Maax 3	740 CE - 830	Late Classic
Maax 1-2	580 CE - 740	
Balam 3	500 CE - 580	Early Classic
Balam 2	350 CE - 500	
Balam 1	150 CE - 350	
Kutz'	? - 150 CE	Late Preclassic

During the beginning of the Early Classic period, the establishment of a royal dynasty marked Naachtun's initial sociopolitical and economic development with Tikal. Residential areas reached their maximal occupation during the Late Classic period. Also during the beginning of the Late Classic period, a political shift occurred as Calakmul established their rule on the East Plaza of Group B. Relations with Tikal were cut during this time then re-established during the Maax 3 phase (740-830 CE). By the Terminal Classic, Naachtun suffered a population loss leaving many of the residential structures abandoned. The population that remained settled in the Central and Southern Complexes located in Group B and remained there until the end of the 10th century.

Naachtun's population is believed to have used slash and burn agricultural methods as suggested by the archeological record.

== Site description ==
The site is quite large, with several Pyramid temples and Acropolis, linked with sacbeob, as well as 2 ballcourts. The central area of Naachtun includes a “concentration of monumental buildings placed atop a limestone ridge bordering a seasonal swamp, or bajo, to the north and a series of residential compounds of different sizes and compositions to the south.” The architecture of the monumental core covers approximately .29 km^{2} of land that is stretched on an east-west axis. The most up to date research indicates that Naachtun started out as a small settlement during the Late Preclassic period, quickly grew during the Early Classic period and remained that way until the Terminal Classic period. The site is divided into three groups: Group A, Group B and Group C. The majority of the structures in Groups C and A were built during the Balam 2 phase (350–500 CE).

=== Group A ===
Group A includes three large plazas: the north, south and west plazas, a large E-Group, Structure XXVII (a pyramid), “La Perdida” (another pyramid), and “a walled compound housing several palatial structures.” There is also a ballcourt located next to Structures XIII and XIV.

=== Group B ===
Group B contains a maze of masonry residential structures situated on low platforms that surround several patios of different sizes, a Western, Central and Southern Complex, a pyramidal structure known as Structure XXV, Structure XXXVIII (a radial pyramid) and public structures (Structure 60-3 and 60-4), all arranged around two plazas: East Plaza and Plaza Río Bec. The East Plaza was associated with the residences of the elite and was located in the Western Complex.

=== Group C ===
Group C contains a group of several pyramidal buildings, a triadic group known as Structure I and a monumental acropolis. Structure I is linked to the ballcourt in Group A by a sacbeob.

=== Stelae ===
Archeologists have excavated 45 stelae from Naachtun. One specific stelae-Stela 18- “presents a gigantic women crushing a confined Ox-Te-Tun captive beneath her.” Stelae 18 is located on the terrace in front of Structure XXXVIII in Group B, on the east side of the main plaza. It is dated to the Late Classic period.
