= La Joyanca =

Archaeological site in Guatemala

La Joyanca is the modern name for a pre-Columbian Maya archaeological site located south of the San Pedro Martir river in the Petén department of Guatemala. It is east of the Maya site of La Florida (Namaan), now the modern town of El Naranjo on the Mexico-Guatemala border. The site was discovered in 1994 during the construction of the Xan-La Libertad oil pipeline in Guatemala. It was immediately recognized as an important, undiscovered Classic period (AD 200-900) Maya city and became the focus of an archaeological project. Directed by Charlotte Arnauld, Erik Ponciano, and Veronique Breuil, the La Joyanca project conducted excavations here between 1998 and 2003. Several members of this group have continued work at other related locations in the Northwest Peten, including the sites of Zapote Bobal and Pajaral, as part of the Proyecto Peten Noroccidente (PNO).

== Archaeology ==
La Joyanca was occupied for well over 1000 years. Dates from the site range from the Late Preclassic (200 BC) to the Terminal Classic/Postclassic (AD 1000). Population levels reached their height here during the Late Classic (AD 600-900); during this era the rulers of La Joyanca embarked upon an ambitious building project in two areas, dubbed the Plaza Principal and the Grupo Guacamaya. The Grupo Guacamaya, a complex of vaulted rooms and corridors, may have served as their palace and thus the seat of local government. Following this prosperous era, the site, like most of its Classic period contemporaries, underwent a dramatic collapse. The Grupo Guacamaya was briefly occupied by squatters in the 10th century, but the area was ultimately abandoned by AD 1000.

The central portion of La Joyanca includes several temple-pyramids and other mounds. The two tallest of these, situated in the Plaza Principal, are 10 and 12 meters high (Str. 6E and 6E-12, respectively). Several of these have been restored, including Structure 6E-12, which contains several vaulted rooms, the remains of hieroglyphic inscriptions, and a stuccoed image of K'inich Ajaw, the Classic Maya sun god. Also noteworthy among the central buildings is Structure 6E-13, which has several rooms atop a platform 6 meters high and 56 meters long.

Although the Grupo Guacamaya seems to be a palace, La Joyanca lacks the clearly identifiable center characteristic of most archaeological sites in the central Petén. There are few sculpted monuments, no ballcourt, and scant signs of a strong, centralized royal dynasty comparable to those functioning at ancient Maya sites like El Peru or Tikal. Likewise, settlement in the area seems to have fluctuated, with longstanding occupied areas standing in stark contrast to communities like the small Gavilán Group, which seems to have been occupied for scarcely a generation.

While the names of the elites who ruled La Joyanca are largely absent from the archaeological record, epigrapher David Stuart, of the University of Texas, has recently demonstrated that an individual bearing the name Chan Ahk or "Sky/Serpent Turtle", an appellation found at the neighboring sites of Zapote Bobal and Pajaral, appears on La Joyanca Stela 1 (dated to AD 485). This suggests that all three sites were related during the Classic Period (AD 200-900) and that they possibly formed a political unit, each site waxing and waning in power over time.
