= Pomona, Tabasco =

Maya archeological site in Tabasco, Mexico

Coordinates: 17.485°N 91.57°W

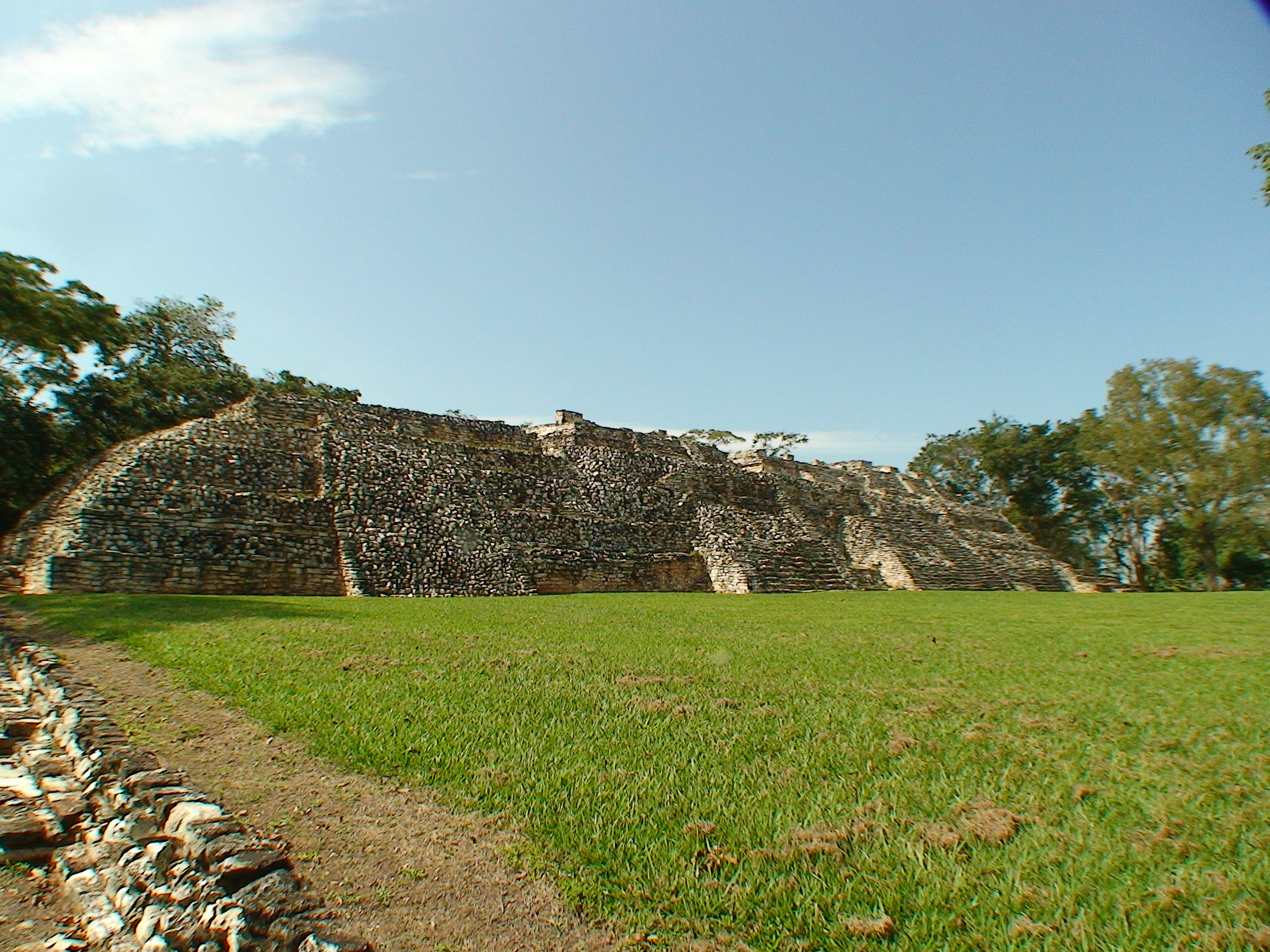
Fig. 1: Pomona Temples V, VI y VII on the western end of a quadrangular plaza.

Pomona is a Maya archaeological site in the Mexican state of Tabasco, municipality of Tenosique, about 30 miles (50 km) east of Palenque. Its flowering was in the Late Classic period.

== Site ==
Pomona is a dispersed settlement built in a fertile, hilly region and belonging to the Usumacinta river sites. It was discovered in 1959 and has been investigated, albeit only very partially, between 1986 and 1988. It consists of a total of six archaeological complexes, only the northernmost one of which, a quadrangular plaza with 13 buildings, has been explored.

== History ==
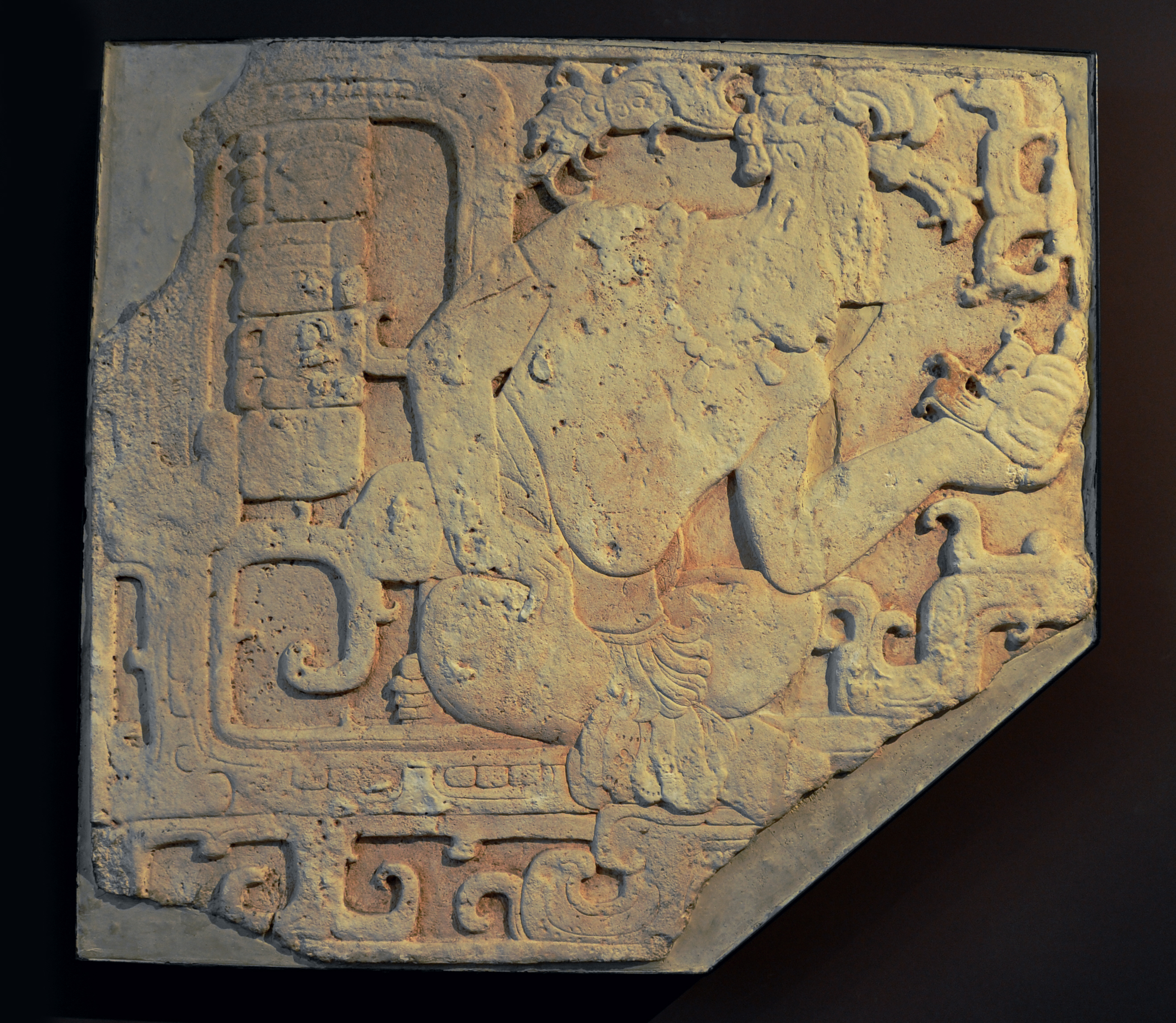
Fig. 2: Pomona relief panel, Rietberg Museum, Zürich

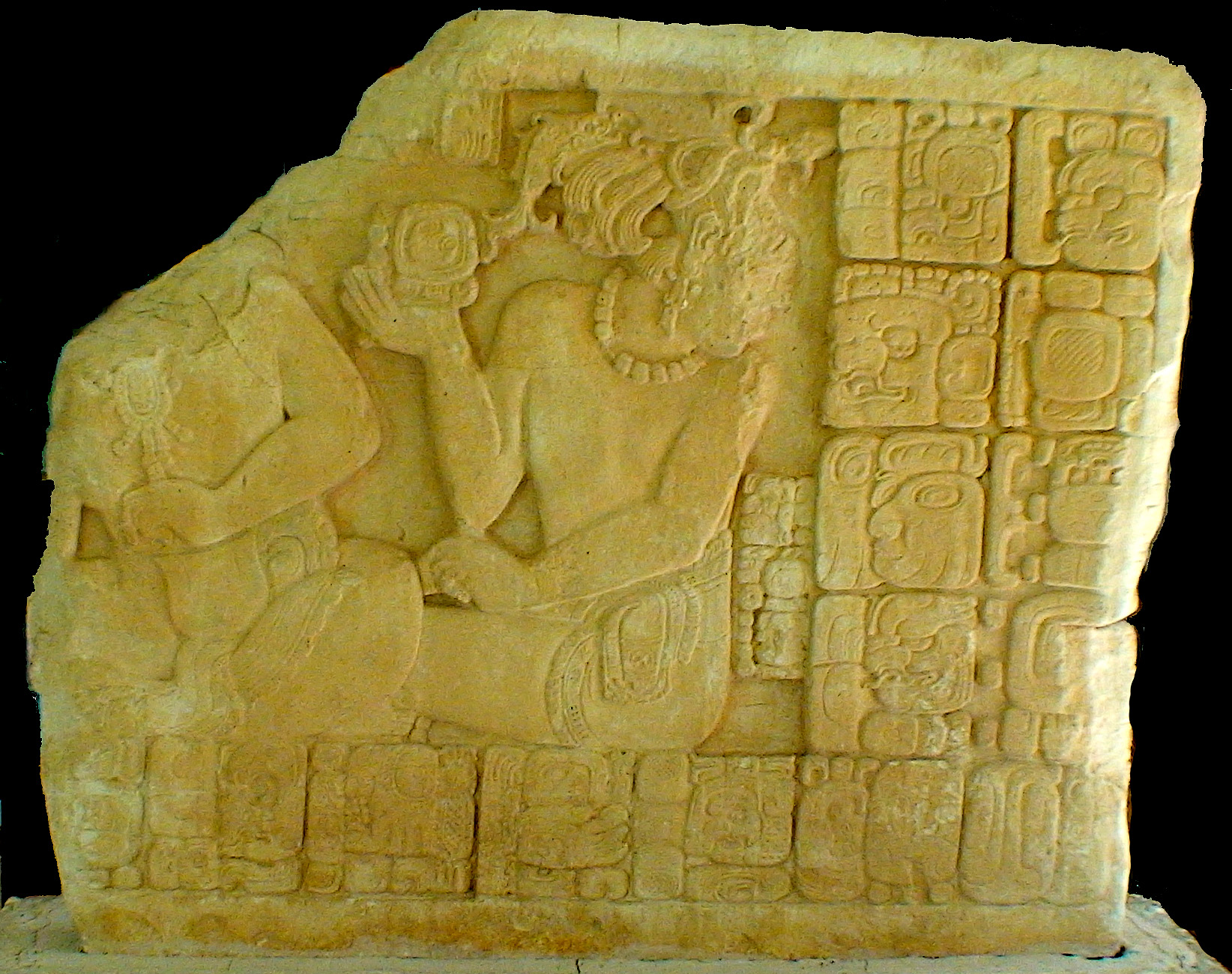
Fig. 3: Pomona relief panel 1, Museo del sitio de Pomona, Tabasco

There are texts at Pomona referring to dates as early as 297 CE, but little more is known from this time period. In 659 CE, Palenque captured six lords in battle. One was said to be from Pipa', a location associated with the site of Pomona. Another Pipa' lord was said to have died in 663. A king of Pomona rose to the throne under the supervision of K'inich Kan Bahlam III of Palenque in 751 CE. In March 792 CE, Piedras Negras attacked Pomona and took prisoners (depicted on Piedras Negras stela 12); the same happened two years later. The defeated king at Pomona was named Kuch' Bahlam.

== Artistic legacy ==
Pomona is renowned for the delicacy and beauty of its relief sculpture, which shows similarities with that of Jonuta and Palenque. Panel 1 (Fig. 3) shows two of originally four young princes wearing the aquatic attributes of the Bacabs and holding Year Bearer days in their hands.

== Bibliography ==
- David Stuart, New Year Recordings in Classic Maya Inscriptions, pp. 3–4. PARI Online Publications.
- Martin, Simon; Nikolai Grube (2000). Chronicle of the Maya Kings and Queens: Deciphering the Dynasties of the Ancient Maya. London and New York: Thames & Hudson. ISBN 0-500-05103-8. OCLC 47358325.
