= Text Database and Dictionary of Classic Mayan =

Database of the Mayan written language

The project Text Database and Dictionary of Classic Mayan (abbr. TWKM) promotes research on the writing and language of pre-Hispanic Maya culture. It is housed in the Faculty of Arts at the University of Bonn and was established with funding from the North Rhine-Westphalian Academy of Sciences, Humanities and the Arts. The project has a projected run-time of fifteen years and is directed by Nikolai Grube from the Department of Anthropology of the Americas at the University of Bonn. The goal of the project is to conduct computer-based studies of all extant Maya hieroglyphic texts from an epigraphic and cultural-historical standpoint, and to produce and publish a database and a comprehensive dictionary of the Classic Mayan language.

== Subject of the Project ==
The text database, as well as the dictionary that will be compiled by the conclusion of the project, will be assembled based on all known texts from the pre-Hispanic Maya culture. These texts were produced and used between approximately the third century B.C. through A.D. 1500, in a region that today includes parts of the countries of Mexico, Guatemala, Belize, and Honduras. The thousands of hieroglyphic inscriptions on monuments, ceramics, or daily objects that have survived into the present offer insight into the language's vocabulary and structure. The project's database and dictionary will digitally represent original spellings using the logo-syllabic Maya hieroglyphs, as well as their transcription and transliteration in the Roman alphabet. The data will be additionally annotated with various epigraphic analyses, translations, and further object-specific information.

== Project Partners ==
TWKM will employ digital technologies in order to compile and make available the data and metadata, as well as to publish the project's research results. The project thereby methodologically positions itself in the field of the digital humanities. The project will be conducted in cooperation with the project partners (below), the research association for the eHumanities TextGrid, as well as the University and Regional Library of Bonn (ULB). The working environment that is currently under construction, in which the data and metadata will be compiled and annotated, will be realized in theTextGrid Laboratory, a software of the virtual research environment. A further component of this software, the TextGrid Repository, will make the data that are authorized for publication freely available online and ensure their long-term storage. The tools for data compilation and annotation attained from the modularly constructed and extended TextGrid lab thereby provide all the necessary materials for facilitating the research team's the typical epigraphic workflow. The workflow usually begins by documenting the texts and the objects on which they are preserved, and by compiling descriptive data. It then continues with the various levels of epigraphic and linguistic analysis, and concludes in the best case scenario with a translation of the analyzed inscription and a corresponding publication. In cooperation with the ULB, selected data will additionally be made available. The project's Virtual Inscription Archive will present online, in the Digital Collections of the ULB, hieroglyphic inscriptions selected from the published data in the repository, including an image of and brief information about the texts and the objects on which they are written, epigraphic analysis, and translation.

== Project Goal ==
One of the project's goals is to produce a dictionary of Classic Mayan, in both digital and print form, towards the end of the project run-time. Additionally, a database with a corpus of inscriptions, including their translations and epigraphic analyses, will be made freely available online. The database furthermore will provide an ontology-like link of the contextual object data with the inscriptions and with each other, thereby allowing a cultural-historical arrangement of all contents within the periods of pre-Hispanic Maya culture. The contents of the database are additionally linked to citations of relevant literature. As a result, the database will also make freely available to both the scientific community and other interested parties a bibliography representing the research history and a base of knowledge concerning ancient Maya culture and script. In addition, the Classic Maya script, in its temporally defined stages of language development, will be gathered into and documented in a comprehensive language corpus with the aid of the information gathered by the project. In collaboration with all project participants, the corpus data can be used, together with the aid of various comparable analyses and also computational linguistic methods, such as inference-based methods, to confirm readings of some hieroglyphs that are currently only partially confirmed, and to eventually completely decipher the Classic Maya script.

== Bibliography ==
- Christian Prager: Das Textdatenbank- und Wörterbuchprojekt des Klassischen Maya. Möglichkeiten und Herausforderungen digitaler Epigraphik [The Text Database and Dictionary Project of Classic Mayan: Possibilities and Challenges of Digital Epigraphy]. In Heike Neuroth, Andrea Rapp, Sibylle Söring (eds.): TextGrid: Von der Community - für die Community [TextGrid: From the Community, for the Community]. Universitätsverlag Göttingen, Göttingen 2015, ISBN 978-3-86488-077-3, pp. 105–125, doi:10.3249/webdoc-3947 (PDF)
- Katja Diederichs: The “Open Science” Strategy of the Project “Text Database and Dictionary of Classic Mayan” - Working Paper 1, 2015, (PDF)
- Nikolai Grube, Christian Prager, Katja Diederichs, Sven Gronemeyer, Elisabeth Wagner, Maximilian Brodhun, Franziska Diehr: "Milestone Report 2014-2016" - Project Report 4, 2017, doi:10.20376/IDIOM-23665556.17.pr004.en
