= Pajaral =

Pre-Columbian Mayan archaeological site

Pajaral, otherwise known as El Pajaral, is the modern name for a mid-sized ruined city of the pre-Columbian Maya archaeological site located to the south of the San Pedro Martir river in the Petén department of Guatemala. The name El Pajaral was coined by archaeologist Ian Graham, who discovered the site in the 1970s, and refers to the numerous birds he encountered there during his survey.

Pajaral, along with the ancient Maya site of Zapote Bobal, has recently been the focus of an archaeological project, the Proyecto Peten Noroccidente (PNO). Endeavors in the area are being directed by James Fitzsimmons (Middlebury College) and Laura Gamez (University of Pittsburgh). The increased attention being paid to these sites is largely the result of a discovery made by epigrapher David Stuart, who connected the archaeological site of Zapote Bobal with a name repeatedly mentioned in the inscriptions of sites like Piedras Negras and Yaxchilan. That name was the toponym Hix Witz, or "Jaguar Hill" Versions of that name occur on monuments recovered at Pajaral as well, suggesting that the two sites were related during the apogee of Maya civilization.

The immediately visible architecture at Pajaral is characterized by temple-mounds ranging from between 8 and 20 metres (26 and 66 feet) in height. Some of these are built atop natural hills: the upper plaza at the site, for example, was constructed on a modified hill 300 metres (980 feet) long by 30 metres (98 feet) high. Although the map of the site is far from complete, it appears that settlement here is rather dispersed and in keeping with other large settlements in the area, including the archaeological site of La Joyanca. Such settlement is not the norm in many places around the Petén Basin. Even Zapote Bobal, the likely regional capital, is more centralized and characterized by a royal palace proper. However, the architecture at the heart of Pajaral is massive: for example, the Main Plaza at Pajaral is accessed by a well-preserved, enormous staircase 46 metres (150 feet) wide and perhaps 30 metres (100 feet) long. Based upon inscriptions and feline iconography at this site, scholars have suggested that this staircase, and its accompanying hill, was the basis for the name Hix Witz and that Pajaral, not Zapote Bobal, was the original regional capital In any event, the scale of construction at Zapote Bobal clearly indicates that by the 7th century it had eclipsed its western neighbor and taken the name Hix Witz for its own.
