= Nikolai Grube =

German Mesoamericanist

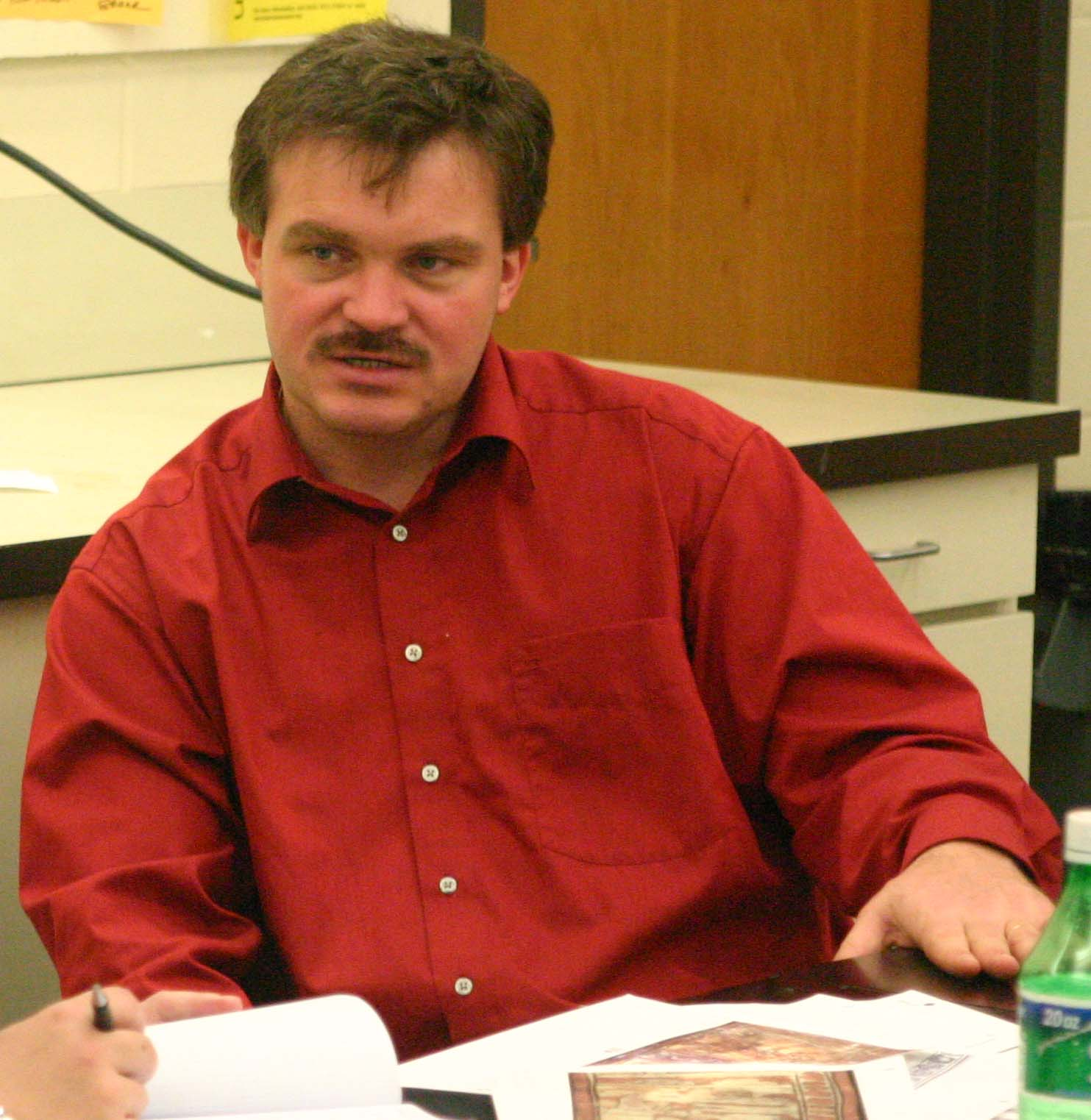
- Grube at the 1994 Maya Meeting
- Born: 1962 (age 63–64); Bonn, North Rhine-Westphalia, West Germany
- Education: University of Hamburg
- Occupations: Epigrapher; Mayanist

Nikolai Grube (born 1962) is a German epigrapher. Grube entered the University of Hamburg in 1982 and graduated in 1985. His doctoral thesis was published at the same university in 1990. After he received his doctorate, Grube moved to the University of Bonn. Nikolai Grube has been heavily involved in the decipherment of the Maya hieroglyphic script.

== Biography ==
He was born in Bonn in 1962. He has served as professor of anthropology and art history at both the University of Texas at Austin and the University of Bonn. At the University of Bonn, he has worked in the Seminar for Ethnology. He has worked with several archaeological projects in the Maya region, including those at Caracol in Belize and Yaxha in the Petén Department of Guatemala. He has also occupied a position at the University of Hamburg. He is fluent in the Yucatec language of the modern Maya inhabitants of the Yucatán Peninsula of Mexico. Nikolai Grube worked with Linda Schele in presenting hieroglyphic workshops for native Mayan speakers in Mexico and Guatemala.

In the 1990s, he visited Naachtun in Petén and recorded the inscriptions on the Maya stelae. He is credited with deciphering the ancient name of the kingdom from the hieroglyphic inscription on Stela 1 at the city. Grube, together with fellow epigrapher Simon Martin, proposed that Maya politics of the Classic Period were dominated by two so-called "superstates" ruled by the rival cities of Tikal and Calakmul.

From 1992 to 1995, Grube received funding from Deutsche Forschungsgemeinschaft ("German Research Foundation") for a project investigating the oral traditions of the Cruzoob Maya of Mexico. In 2010 Nikolai Grube served as one of the directors of the Interdisciplinary Latin America Center at the University of Bonn. Nikolai Grube is co-editor of the Mexicon journal and is a consultant for the Mexican magazine Arqueología Mexicana ("Mexican Archaeology").

Since 2014, Nikolai Grube is directing the project Text Database and Dictionary of Classic Mayan, which has a projected run-time of 15 years. It is housed in the Faculty of Arts at the University of Bonn and was established with funding from the North Rhine-Westphalian Academy of Sciences, Humanities and the Arts. The goal of the project is to conduct computer-based studies of all extant Maya hieroglyphic texts from an epigraphic and cultural-historical standpoint, and to produce and publish a database and a comprehensive dictionary of the Classic Mayan language.

== See also ==
- "Works of Nikolai Grube". Google Scholar.
