= La Mar =

Mayan archaeological site in Chiapas, Mexico

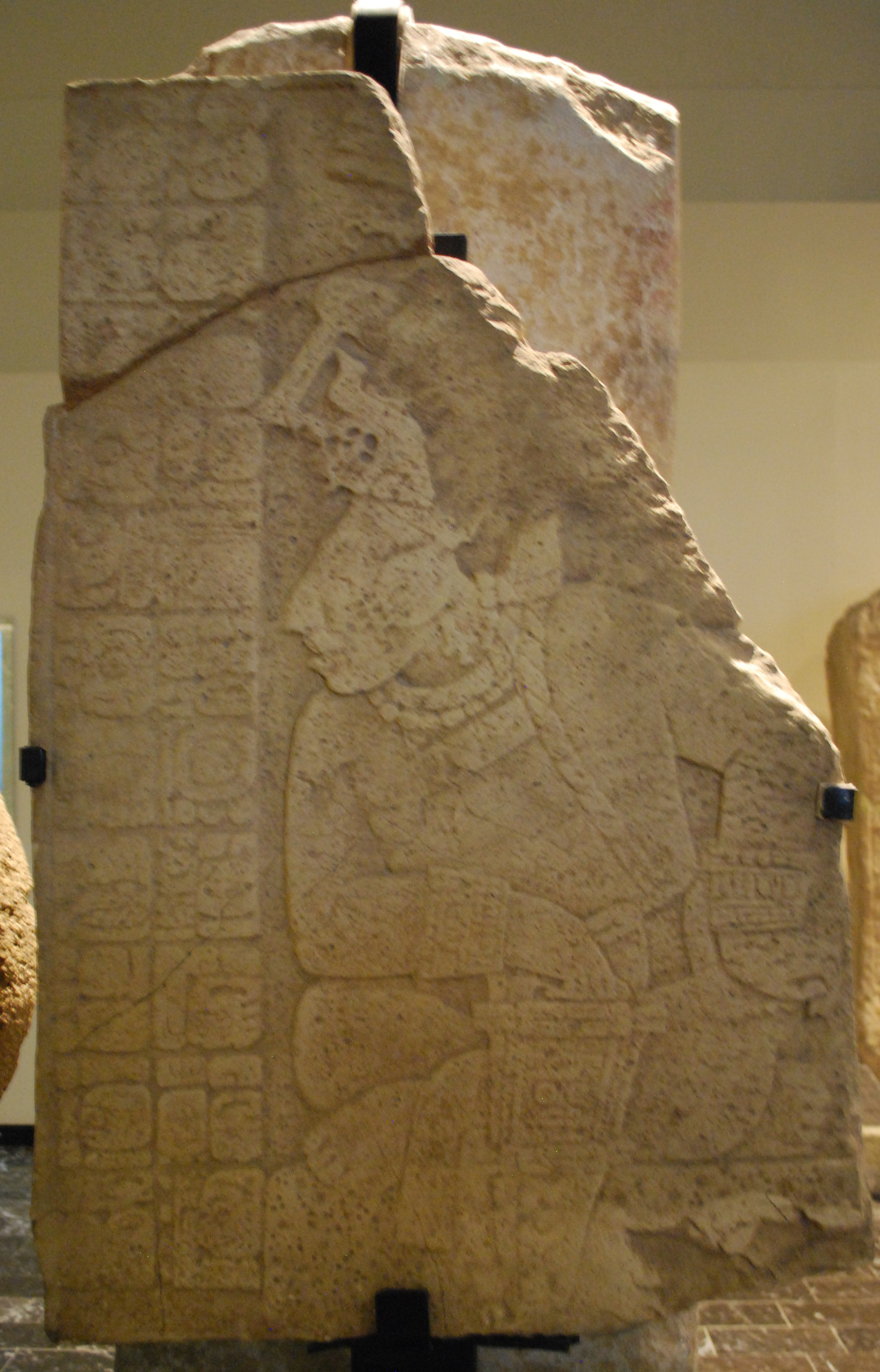
Stele fragment from La Mar, Ocosingo, Chiapas (600-900CE) on display at the Regional Museum in Tuxtla Gutierrez, Chiapas, Mexico.

La Mar, also known by its Maya name Rabbit Stone, is the modern name for a ruined city of the pre-Columbian Maya civilization located in the state of Chiapas in Mexico. La Mar's central hub was established on hills and faced the Santo Domingo Valley to the west. To protect themselves from their enemies, the people of La Mar built walls and ramparts that blocked the routes coming into the city from the valley.

La Mar clashed with the local Toniná and Sak tzʼi polities. During the 8th century AD, it was an ally of the nearby center Piedras Negras, and in both AD 792 and 794, La Mar helped Piedras Negras defeat the polity Pomoná. La Mar was ruled by an ajaw, one of whom is identified on Stela 12 at Piedras Negras as being named Parrot Chaak.
