= Stephen D. Houston =

American Mesoamericanist scholar

- Born: November 11, 1958 (age 67); Chambersburg, Pennsylvania

Academic background
- Education: University of Pennsylvania Yale University

Academic work
- Institutions: Brown University Brigham Young University

Stephen Douglas Houston (/ˈhaʊstən/ HOW-stən; born November 11, 1958) is an American anthropologist, archaeologist, epigrapher, and Mayanist scholar, who is particularly renowned for his research into the pre-Columbian Maya civilization of Mesoamerica. He is the author of a number of papers and books concerning topics such as the Maya script, the history, kingships and dynastic politics of the pre-Columbian Maya, and archaeological reports on several Maya archaeological sites, particularly Dos Pilas and El Zotz. In 2021, National Geographic noted that he participated in the correct cultural association assigned to a half-size replica discovered at the Tikal site of the six-story pyramid of the mighty Teotihuacan culture, which replicated its Citadel that includes the original Feathered Serpent Pyramid.

Houston is an endowed chair as the Dupee Family Professor of Social Science at Brown University, Providence, Rhode Island, and is a professor in the department of anthropology at the university.

Houston has collaborated with many of his students and colleagues on projects and publications. He has led investigations at Piedras Negras, Kaminaljuyu, and El Zotz, Guatemala. These projects have resulted in new information on the ancient cultures of Mesoamerica.

== Biography and career ==
Stephen Douglas Houston was born in Chambersburg, Pennsylvania and was graduated from Carlisle High School. In 1976, he commenced undergraduate studies at the University of Pennsylvania in anthropology. From 1978–79 he spent a year as an exchange student at Edinburgh University, Scotland, where he participated in his first field trips, excavating Mesolithic and Neolithic bog sites in counties Offaly and Mayo, Ireland, and at a Bronze Age henge near Strathallan, Scotland.

Returning to Penn, Houston was graduated summa cum laude in 1980 with a B.A. in anthropology. He then entered the graduate studies program at Yale University, undertaking a Master of Philosophy (Anthropology) research degree, which was awarded in 1983. During this time he took a position of curatorial assistant at the Peabody Museum of Natural History, followed by a position as a teaching fellow at Yale. Specialising in archaeological and epigraphic Maya studies, Houston participated in several field trips recording Maya stelae and inscriptions in Guatemala, Belize, and Mexico (Bonampak), and he held the first of various research fellowships.

After completing his M.Phil., Houston worked toward completing his Ph.D. in anthropology at Yale, which was awarded (with Distinction) in 1987. During this period he worked as an epigrapher on an archaeological project at the site of Caracol, Belize, and served as director on a project mapping the Dos Pilas site in the Petexbatun region, Pasión River, Guatemala, spending several months at a time in fieldwork for these positions. The work at Dos Pilas was expanded into his dissertation, The Inscriptions and Monumental Art of Dos Pilas, Guatemala: A Study of Classic Maya History and Politics.

Before joining the Brown University faculty, Houston held the Jesse Knight chair at Brigham Young University.

In 2008 the MacArthur Foundation named Professor Houston as a MacArthur Fellow and recipient of a 'genius' award.

On 21 July 2011 Houston was awarded the Order of the Quetzal by the president of Guatemala in recognition of his contributions to the study of Maya culture and for promoting knowledge of ancient Mayan culture in the English speaking world.

Houston spent the 2014-15 academic year as the Ailsa Mellon Bruce Senior Fellow at the National Gallery of Art’s Center for the Advanced Study of Visual Arts (CASVA).

In 2018, he was appointed by the Library of Congress as the inaugural Jay I. Kislak Chair for the study of the history and cultures of the early Americas at the John W. Kluge Center.

Houston gave the 72nd Andrew Mellon lectures at the National Gallery of Art in 2023. That same year, he was awarded the Orden del Pop from the Universidad Francisco Marroquin.

Houston is a member of the Editorial Advisory Board of the archaeology journal Antiquity and was a founding editor of Ancient Mesoamerica

He is married to Nancy Dayton Houston and they have two children.
