= Simon Martin (Mayanist) =

British scholar (born 1969)

- Born: c. 1969 (age c. 56)
- Education: Institute of Archaeology, UCL (PhD 2014) Royal College of Art London (MA 1987)
- Known for: Epigraphic study of Maya dynastic and political history, religion, art, and iconography
- Awards: James Henry Breasted Prize (2021)
- Scientific career
- Fields: Mayanist scholar (epigraphy, history)
- Workplaces: Penn Museum, University of Pennsylvania

Simon Martin (born c. 1969) is a British epigrapher, historian, writer, and Mayanist scholar. He is best known for his contributions to the study and decipherment of the Maya script, the writing system used by the pre-Columbian Maya civilisation of Mesoamerica. As one of the leading epigraphers active in contemporary Mayanist research, Martin has specialised in the study of the political interactions and dynastic histories of Classic-era Maya polities. Since 2003 Martin has held positions at the University of Pennsylvania Museum of Archaeology and Anthropology where he is currently an Associate Curator and Keeper in the American Section, while teaching select courses as an Adjunct Associate Professor in the Department of Anthropology at the University of Pennsylvania.

== Early life and career ==
Simon Martin entered the field of Mayanist research with a professional background in graphic design. He attended the Royal College of Art in London during the 1980s, completing his Master's in Communication Arts in 1987. As a professional designer he worked in televisual media into the mid-1990s, for production companies designing visual elements and programmed content for TV, film and commercials.

Martin had been fascinated by the Maya civilisation since childhood. After a period spent in independent study and research, in the late 1980s Martin began attending Mesoamericanist conferences and Maya hieroglyphics workshops. In parallel with his work in the design profession Martin corresponded with scholars active in Maya research, and travelled to Central America to visit some of the Maya archaeological sites.

His reading proficiency and knowledge of Maya inscriptions was soon recognised in the field, and by the mid-1990s Martin was operating as an honorary research fellow at UCL's Institute of Archaeology. He gained his doctorate at the same institution in 2014.

Martin secured a residential fellowship grant from Washington, D.C.'s Dumbarton Oaks Research Library and Collection in pre-Columbian studies for the 1996-1997 academic year. The fellowship allowed Martin to later move into Mayanist research as his full-time profession. In 2000, his co-authored book Chronicle of the Maya Kings and Queens: Deciphering the Dynasties of the Ancient Maya (with Nikolai Grube) was released and later translated into five other languages (Spanish, Portuguese, Hungarian, Bulgarian, and Japanese). An updated second edition was published in 2008. Together with US art historian Mary Miller, he co-developed the exhibition "Courtly Art of the Ancient Maya" at the National Gallery of Art, Washington, D.C., and the Fine Arts Museums of San Francisco in 2004, resulting in the co-authored book Courtly Art of the Ancient Maya from the same year.

In 2003, Martin took up a position as the research specialist in Maya epigraphy at the University of Pennsylvania's Penn Museum, from where he has continued to conduct field reconnaissances to the Maya lowlands, write research papers and act as scholarly consultant for several museum exhibitions of Maya art and artefacts. He co-curated the "Maya 2012: Lords of Time" in 2012 at Penn Museum, and in 2019 completed the full re-installation of its Mexico and Central America Gallery. For the academic year 2019-2020 he was awarded the Jay I. Kislak Chair for the Study of the History and Cultures of the Early Americas at the Library of Congress, Washington, D.C.

In 2020, he published the book Ancient Maya Politics: A Political Anthropology of the Classic Period 150-900 CE (Cambridge University Press), an extended re-analysis of the political data in the inscriptions and proposals for the underlying mechanisms at work during the florescence of Maya civilization. In 2021 that work won three prizes at the Association of American Publishers PROSE Awards, being judged best in the section of Biological Anthropology, Ancient History, and Archaeology, in the Humanities section, and finally the R.R. Hawkins Award—the first time that Cambridge University Press had taken that honor. It also received the 2021 James Henry Breasted Prize for history before 1000 CE from the American Historical Association.

== Research ==
In the early 1990s, Martin was at the forefront of epigraphic research that would challenge some prevailing views on the nature of Maya lowland states and their political interactions during the Mid- to Late-Classic period. Archaeologists and epigraphers had generally conceived the Maya lowlands region of this era as a mosaic of dozens of polities or city-states, each controlling only a small surrounding territory and acting more or less independently of the others. These states were engaged in alternating episodes of warfare and alliance with one another, but such interactions had been assessed as primarily local and transient in nature. However, evidence for the hierarchical ranking of kings overturned this concept and replaced it with a model in which a few dominant kingdoms exercised control over others in wide-ranging and enduring elite networks.

He conducted field research at the UNESCO World Heritage Site of Calakmul, in the state of Campeche in Mexico, between 1994 and 2016, and is currently collaborating with a project excavating at Ucanal in Guatemala.
