= Mayanist =

Specialist in the Mayan language or culture

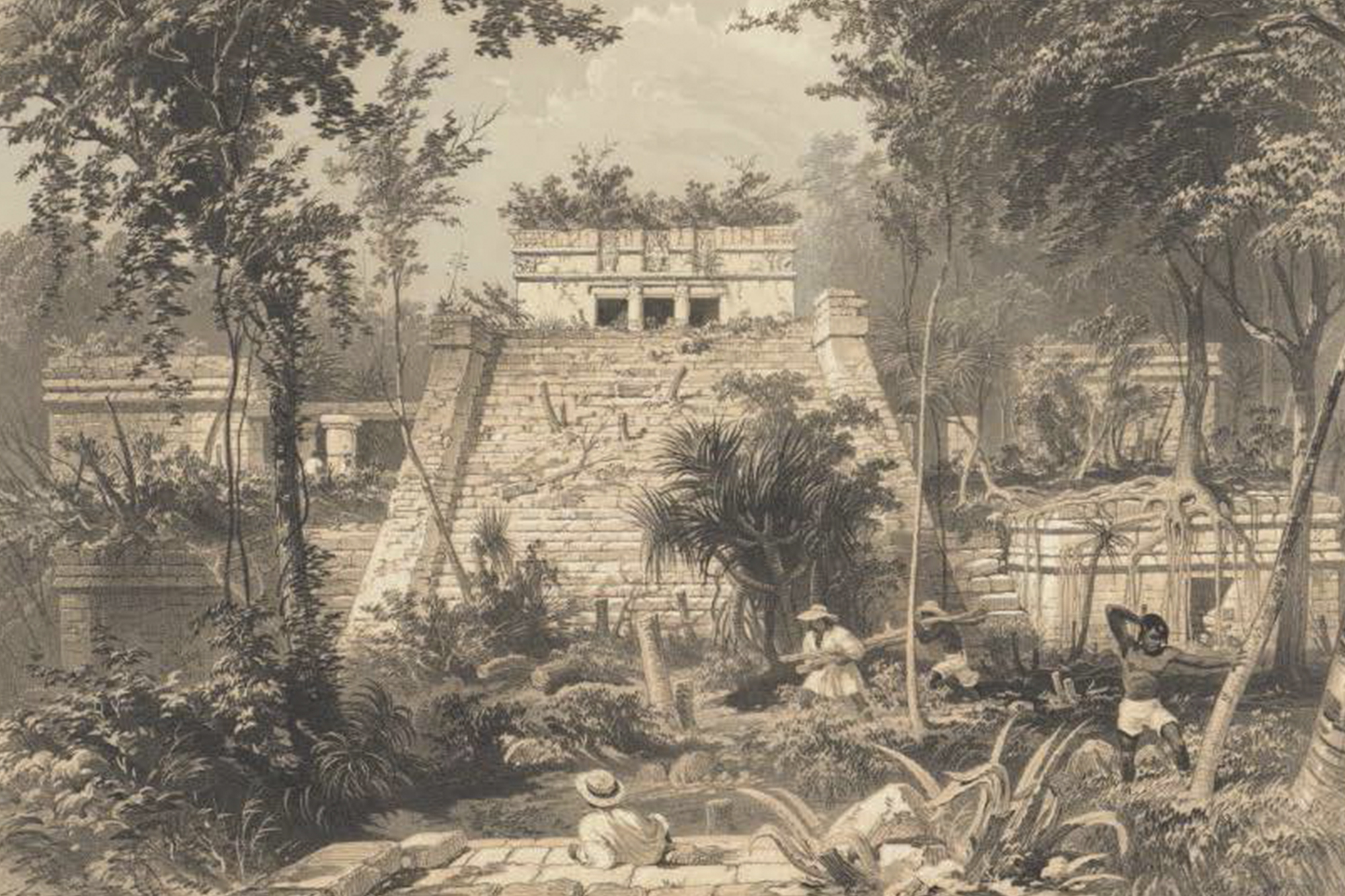
- Tulum / 1844 lithograph by F Catherwood

Occupation
- Synonyms: Mayanologist
- Occupation type: profession
- Activity sectors: archaeology; history; linguistics; epigraphy; anthropology; ethnology

A Mayanist (Spanish: mayista) is a scholar specialising in research and study of the Mesoamerican pre-Columbian Maya civilisation. This discipline should not be confused with Mayanism, a collection of New Age beliefs about the ancient Maya.

Mayanists draw upon many inter-related disciplines including archaeology, linguistics, epigraphy, ethnology, history, photography/art, architecture, astronomy and ceramics.

The term Mayanist was coined by parallel with specialised fields studying other historical civilisations; see for example, Egyptologist (Ancient Egypt) and Assyriologist (Ancient Mesopotamia). It has been in widespread use from the late 19th century onwards, particularly by those who have studied and contributed to the decipherment of Maya hieroglyphics, the complex and elaborate writing system which was developed by the ancient Maya.

== See also ==
- Archaeology of the Americas
- Assyriologist
- Egyptologist
- Mesoamerican literature
