= Mexican peso =

Currency of Mexico

peso mexicano (Spanish)
- Series 2019

ISO 4217
- Code: MXN (numeric: 484)
- Subunit: 0.01

Units of account
- Base unit: peso
- Plural: pesos
- Symbol: $
- Subunit
- 1/100: centavo
- Plural
- centavo: centavos
- Symbol
- centavo: ¢

Denominations
- Banknotes
- Freq. used: $20, $50, $100, $200, $500
- Rarely used: $1000
- Coins
- Freq. used: $1, $2, $5, $10
- Rarely used: $0.05, $0.10, $0.20, $0.50, $10, $50 (commemorative), $100 (commemorative)

Demographics
- User(s): Mexico and Santa Elena, Corozal, Belize

Issuance
- Central bank: Bank of Mexico
- Website: www.banxico.org.mx
- Printer: Bank of Mexico
- Website: www.banxico.org.mx
- Mint: Casa de Moneda de México
- Website: www.cmm.gob.mx

Valuation
- Inflation: 4.22% (2025)
- Source: Banco de Mexico

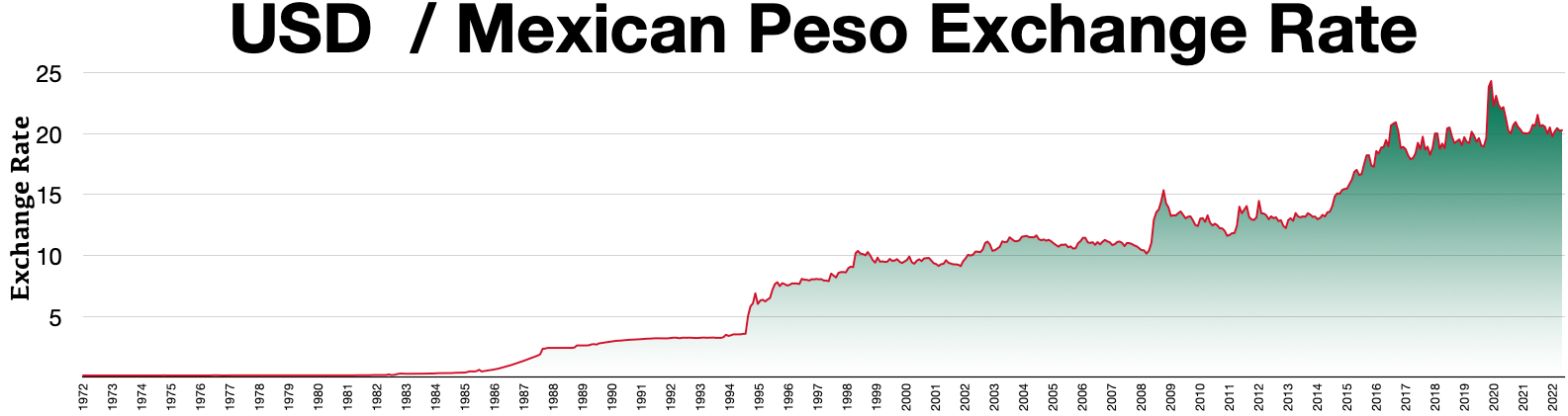
USD/MXN exchange rate. The Mexican peso crisis in 1994 was an unpegging and devaluation of the peso and happened the same year NAFTA was ratified.

The Mexican peso (symbol: $; currency code: MXN; also abbreviated Mex$ to distinguish it from other peso-denominated currencies) is the official currency of Mexico. The currency was first introduced in 1863, replacing the old Spanish colonial real.

Each peso is subdivided into 100 centavos, represented by "¢". Mexican banknotes are issued by the Bank of Mexico in various denominations and feature vibrant colors and imagery representing Mexican culture and history. Modern peso and dollar currencies have a common origin in the 16th–19th century Spanish dollar, most continuing to use its sign, "$". During the era of silver coinage, the Spanish dollar and the Mexican peso circulated globally in trade and as reserve currencies. They were also legal tender in the United States, Canada, and China, and served as a model for the U.S dollar and several other currencies.

The current ISO 4217 code for the peso is MXN; the "N" refers to the "new peso". Prior to the 1993 revaluation, the code MXP was used. The Mexican peso is the 16th most traded currency in the world, the third most traded currency from the Americas (after the United States dollar and Canadian dollar), and the most traded currency from Latin America.

== History ==
=== Etymology ===
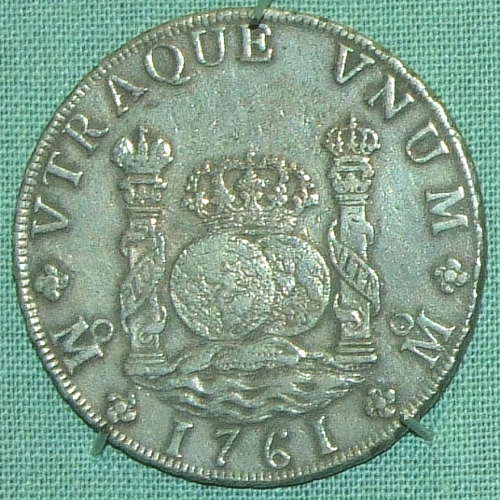
Spanish dollar, 1761

The name was first used in reference to pesos oro ('gold weights') or pesos plata ('silver weights'). The Spanish word peso means "weight". (Compare the British pound sterling.) Other countries that use the term pesos for the currency include: Argentina, Chile, Colombia, Cuba, Dominican Republic, the Philippines, and Uruguay.

=== Precursor ===
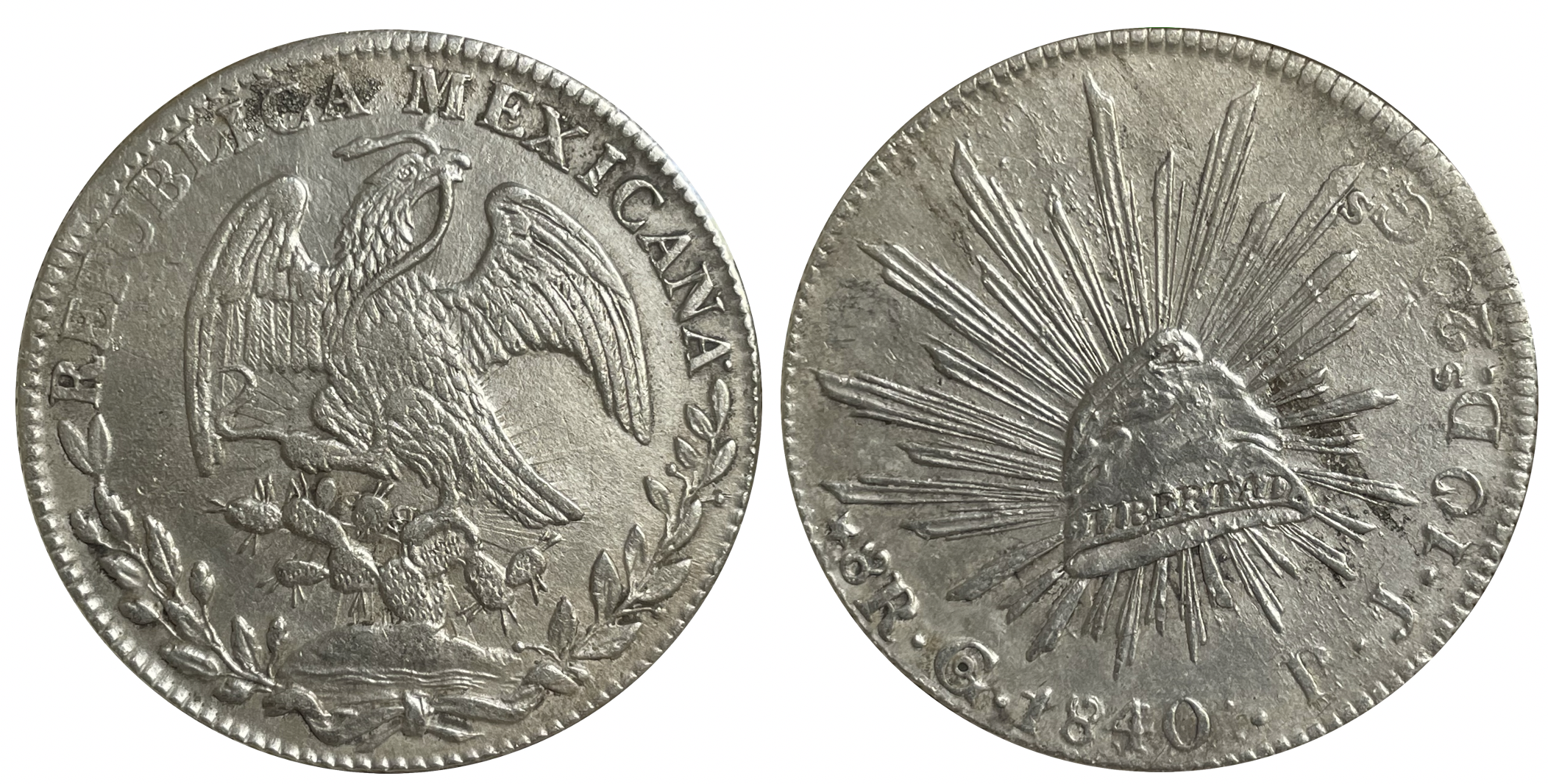
Silver peso, or eight-real, coin of cap and ray design, used for East Asian trade, 1840

The currency system in use in Spanish America from the 16th to 19th centuries consisted of silver reales, weight 3.433 grams and fineness 67/72 = 93.1%, as well as gold escudos, weight 3.383 g and fineness 11/12 = 91.7%. By the 19th century the silver real weighed 3.383 g, fineness 65/72 = 90.3%, while the gold escudo's fineness was reduced to 21 karats or 21/24, or 87.5% fine.

15 or 16 silver reales were worth a gold escudo, and eight-real coins of 24.44 g fine silver were widely called pesos in Spanish America and dollars in Britain and its American colonies. These pesos, or dollars, were minted from the rich silver mine outputs of modern-day Mexico and Bolivia and exported in large quantities to Europe and Asia. These pesos served as a global silver standard reserve currency until the start of the 20th century and became the model for the various pesos of Spanish America as well as (among others) the United States dollar, Chinese yuan and Japanese yen. Mexican silver pesos of original cap-and-ray design were legal tender in the United States until 1857 and in China until 1935.

=== Origin ===
The first Mexican mint to produce pesos was established in 1535.

While the United States divided their dollar into 100 cents early on from 1793, post-independence Mexico retained the peso of eight reales until 1863 when the Second Mexican Empire under Emperor Maximillan commenced the minting of pesos divided into 100 centavos. The restored Mexican republic under Benito Juárez and Porfirio Díaz continued the minting of centavo coins in base metal or silver, as well as gold coins in pesos, but it had to revert the silver one-peso coin to the old eight-reales cap-and-ray design from 1873 to 1897 after East Asian merchants rejected or discounted the newly designed peso coins.

The post-independence silver peso contained 27.07 grams of 90.3% fine silver (24.44 g fine) while the gold peso or half escudo contained 1.6915 grams of 87.5% fine gold (1.48 g fine). After most of Europe switched to the gold standard in the 1870s the gold peso substantially rose in value against the silver peso, until it became 2 silver pesos to a gold peso or a gold peso dollar by 1900. In 1905 the peso was solely defined as 0.75 g fine gold.

From 1918 onward the weight and fineness of all the silver coins declined, until 1979, when the last silver 100-peso coins were minted. The U.S. dollar was worth 2.00 silver pesos from 1905 to 1929, rising afterward until it stabilized at 12.50 pesos from 1954 to 1976.

=== Reformation ===
Throughout most of the 20th century, the Mexican peso remained one of the more stable currencies in Latin America, since the economy did not experience periods of hyperinflation common to other countries in the region.

==== Devaluations in 1976 and 1982 ====
The U.S. dollar leapt from 12.50 to 19.40 pesos in 1976. After the oil crisis of the late 1970s, Mexico defaulted on its external debt in 1982, causing severe capital flight and several years of inflation and devaluation. The dollar again rose from 23 to 150 pesos that year, causing any company with loans in USD and contracts in MXP to have their financial position weakened by the devaluation, the result becoming high unemployment and pressure on remaining employees to pick up the increased workloads and putting strain on economic hardships. Government attempts to fix the economy with an inward-looking industrialization strategy were only sustainable with severe economic imbalances that needed large inward capital flows that could not be maintained, and an abrupt process of stabilization and adjustment followed that saw a recession in 1983, stabilizing only in the early 1990s at above 3,000 MXP/USD when a government economic strategy called the "Stability and Economic Growth Pact" (Pacto de estabilidad y crecimiento económico, PECE) was adopted under President Carlos Salinas.

==== New peso, 1993 ====
On January 1, 1993, the Bank of Mexico introduced a new currency, the nuevo peso ("new peso", or MXN), written "N$" followed by the numerical amount. One new peso, or N$1.00, was equal to 1,000 of the obsolete MXP pesos.

==== New peso notes and coins ====
Series A and B banknotes

MXP $20000 (Series A, 1985)

MXN $20 (Series B, 1993)

The transition was done with minimal confusion by issuing the Series B "nuevo peso" banknotes in N$10, $20, $50, and $100 denominations with designs nearly identical to the corresponding banknote in the preceding Series A, which were labelled in old pesos (MXP $10,000, $20,000, $50,000, and $100,000, respectively); for Series B, the equivalent nuevo peso face value was 1/1000 of the old peso face value for Series A. For example, the Series A old peso MXP$20,000 and the Series B nuevo peso MXN$20 banknotes share the same design, aside from the updated face value. Old and new pesos circulated simultaneously between 1993 and 1995, but old peso Series A banknotes were gradually retired at this time, and newly designed Series C "nuevo peso" banknotes commenced in 1994. From January 1, 1996, the "nuevo peso" was simply renamed to "peso", and new Series D banknotes were issued identical to Series C except for the word "nuevo" dropped. The ISO 4217 code remained unchanged as MXN. Series A and AA banknotes were demonetized and no longer legal tender as of January 1, 1996. Although they remain legal tender, Series B, C, D, and D1 banknotes are in the process of being withdrawn from circulation; in addition, the MXN$1000 Series F banknote is being withdrawn. The most commonly circulated banknotes in Mexico are MXN$20 and above in Series F and G.

Similarly, Series B coins in nuevo peso denominations were circulated starting from 1993 and Series A and AA coins were demonetized starting from November 15, 1995. Unlike the notes, Series B coins differed in size and design from the Series A coins. Series C coins (which dropped the "N$" prefix on the MXN$1, N$5, N$10, N$20, and N$50 coins) were circulated starting in 1996 following the withdrawal of Series A and AA coins. Series B and C coins in uncommon denominations (10-centavo and MXN$20 and greater) are gradually being withdrawn from circulation. Although they remain legal tender, they are set aside when they arrive at commercial banks. The most commonly circulated coins in Mexico are MXN$10 and below in Series C and D.

==== Economic effects ====
The government's operational balances had been predicted to remain stable as the country was operating in a surplus between 1990 and 1994. This crisis was seen as the fault of the Mexican government in its signing of NAFTA at the beginning of 1994. The volatility of MXN increased after the ratification of NAFTA, when the annualized standard deviations seem to be highest post-1994, especially in terms of USD, compared to the United States, which experienced the lowest annualized standard deviation during that same period. Still, several contemporary economists of the time noted the unexpected shocks to the economy during 1994, which exacerbated the situation, starting with the assassination of presidential candidate Luis Donaldo Colosio, causing a ripple effect on the exchange rate and interest rates that resulted in increased capital leaving the country. The result was the devaluation of MXN because of a domestic recession and an avalanche of investor withdrawals due to concern about the government's inability to remain liquid in its international debt repayments. The international outlook, particularly in Wall Street, on the MXN peso crisis was affected by the lack of information on Mexico's financial reserves from the Banco de Mexico, which only released information on Mexico's reserves three times a year, and the speed of reserve depletion to stabilize the MXN finally resulted in a 15% devaluation by 20 December 1994 and a lack of clear announcements on how the Mexican government was going to handle the crisis. In one day, Banco de Mexico lost US$4 billion in holdings. The 1994 crisis was more devastating as it was released on a new peso currency. The adoption of MXN in 1993 was meant to balance the economy, and MXP 1000 was the same as MXN 1 upon its 1993 introduction. The MXN crisis let investors in 1995 see a failure of Mexican authorities to act with a lack of preparation to soften the devaluation with a more substantial commitment to maintaining the stability of the exchange rates and questioning further investment in the economy. As the GNP fell by 9.2% in 1995, the panic of the MXN devaluation was significant to Mexican citizens, as the peso depreciated against the USD by 82.9%, while the interest rates rose from 10.5 to 42.7%. The unemployment rates of married male employees increased significantly in urban areas of Mexico, resulting in married women and teenagers from the same households finding employment to prevent the financial collapse of domestic quality of life. Married women with an unemployed husband experienced an employment rate of 33.84% and an unemployment rate of 1.62% compared with unmarried women during this period. The unexpected increase in Mexican immigration, both legal and illegal, in 1995 resulted from the MXN devaluation, pushing Mexican citizens to seek better employment opportunities in the United States. Migration in 1995 was 40% higher than the average level of the rest of the 1990s, with 200,000 to 300,000 more Mexicans immigrating over the border, increasing a labour shock in Mexico that also affected parts of the southwestern United States. There was a significant decline in Mexican household expenditure during this time, where durable and semidurable commodities like televisions, glassware, clothing, and other goods that could be postponed fell between 1996 and 1998, while household food expenditure increased, with lower income households seeing an increase of 3.5% and middle-class households seeing a 2.4% increase, due to the resulting inflation of prices. MXN finally started to see a stabilization between 1996 and 1998, once the Mexican government had enacted banking rescue packages to prevent further collapse, resulting in state control over a large majority of the Mexican financial sector, which led to a renewed growth in the economy that saw more stability by the turn of the millennium.

==== Subsequent exchange rates ====
- Following the revaluation in 1993, the official exchange rate was MXN$3 against the U.S. dollar.
- After the Mexican peso crisis of December 1994, the peso sharply depreciated from MXN$3.4 to MXN$7.2 in 1995.
- It then traded between MXN$8 and MXN$11 from 1998 to 2008, depreciated to MXN$15.56 in March 2009 due to the 2008 financial crisis before appreciating to MXN$12–MXN$14 in the early 2010s.
- The peso depreciated from MXN$14.78 in 2014 to MXN$17 in 2015.
- Since 2016 the peso has been trading between MXN$17 and MXN$21, but sometimes it deviated outside of this range.
  - Amidst the COVID-19 pandemic, it depreciated to its all-time low of MXN$25 per dollar.
  - From 2020 to 2024, it appreciated by over 30%, reaching a near nine-year high of MXN$16.31 per dollar in April 2024. This was mostly attributed to the growth of "near-shoring" strategies, growing foreign investment, as well as the strict monetary policy adopted by the Bank of Mexico in attempts to curb inflation following the COVID pandemic and the Russian Invasion of Ukraine.

== Coins ==
=== Real ===
Coins issued from the 16th to 19th centuries under the Spanish American system of reales and escudos included

- in gold: 1/2, 1, 2, 4 and 8 escudos, with 1 escudo ≈ 2 pesos or 16 reales.
- in silver: 1/2, 1, 2, 4 and 8 reales, with 1 peso = 8 reales.

Additionally, Mexico issued copper coins denominated in tlacos or 1/8 real (1/64 peso). Post-independence silver coins were of the cap and ray design showing a radiant Phrygian cap marked "Libertad" (liberty), which became familiar to East Asian traders. This design ended in 1872 with the minting of "centavo" coins except for the silver 8-reales which was revived as a trade coin from 1873 to 1897.

=== Peso, 19th century ===
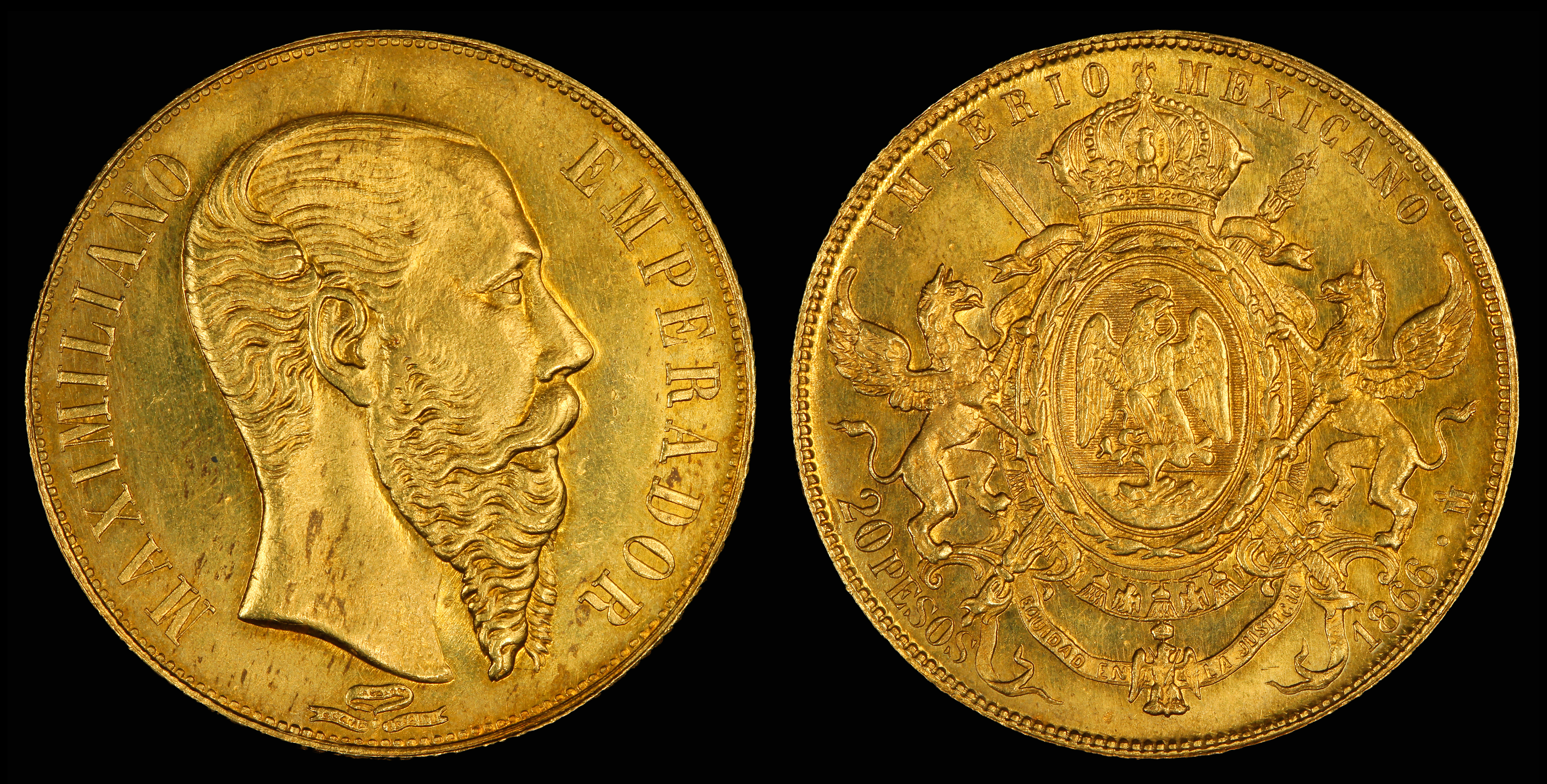
Front and back of an 1866 twenty-peso gold coin, depicting Maximilian I of Mexico

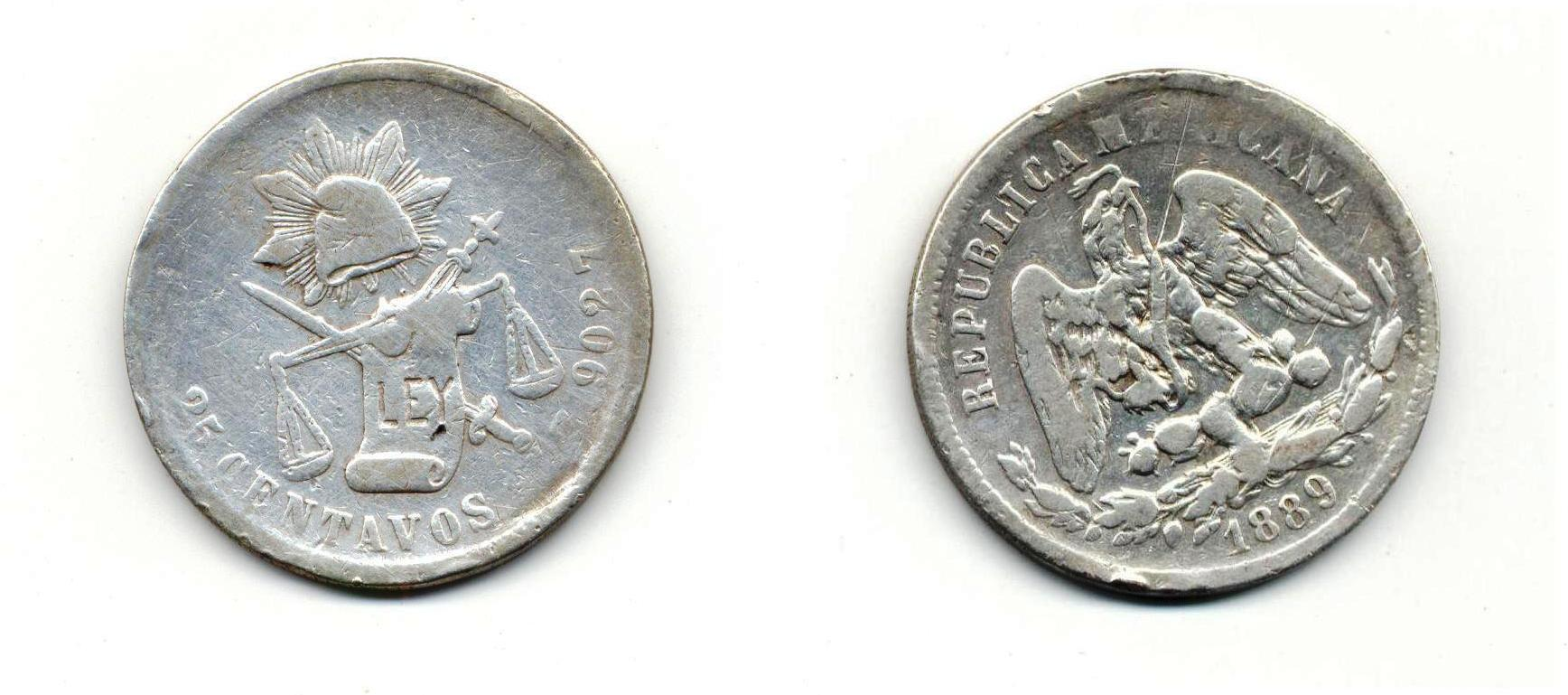
Peseta or 25 centavos, 1889

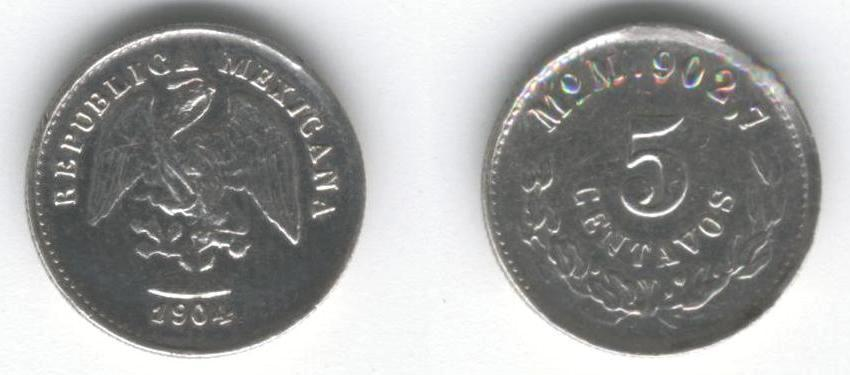
Quinto or 5 centavos, 1904

The Second Mexican Empire of 1863-1867 commenced the minting of coins denominated in pesos and centavos, minting the copper 1-centavo, silver 5, 10 and 50 centavos, the silver 1-peso and the gold 20-peso. The last two coins featured the portrait of Emperor Maximilian on the obverse, and the imperial arms of the short-lived empire on the reverse.

The Restored Mexican republic of 1867 continued the minting of coins in pesos and centavos. The copper 1-centavo coin was continued; silver (.9027 fine) coins of 5, 10, 20, 25 and 50 centavos and 1 peso commenced in 1867; and gold coins of 1, 2 1/2, 5, 10 and 20 pesos commenced in 1870. The obverses featured the Mexican 'eagle' and the legend "Republica Mexicana". The reverses of the larger coins showed a pair of scales; those of the smaller coins, the denomination.

In 1882, cupro-nickel 1, 2 and 5 centavos coins were issued but they were only minted for two years. Despite the discontinuation of the newly designed silver peso in 1873, in 1898 the denomination on the "cap-and-ray" coin was successfully revised from "8 reales" to "1 peso" without being rejected in China; this continued to be minted as trade coinage until 1909. From 1900 the market value of the gold coins have approximately doubled versus their face values.

=== Peso, 20th century ===
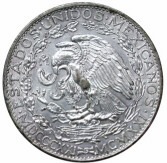
Two-peso centennial commemorative, 1921

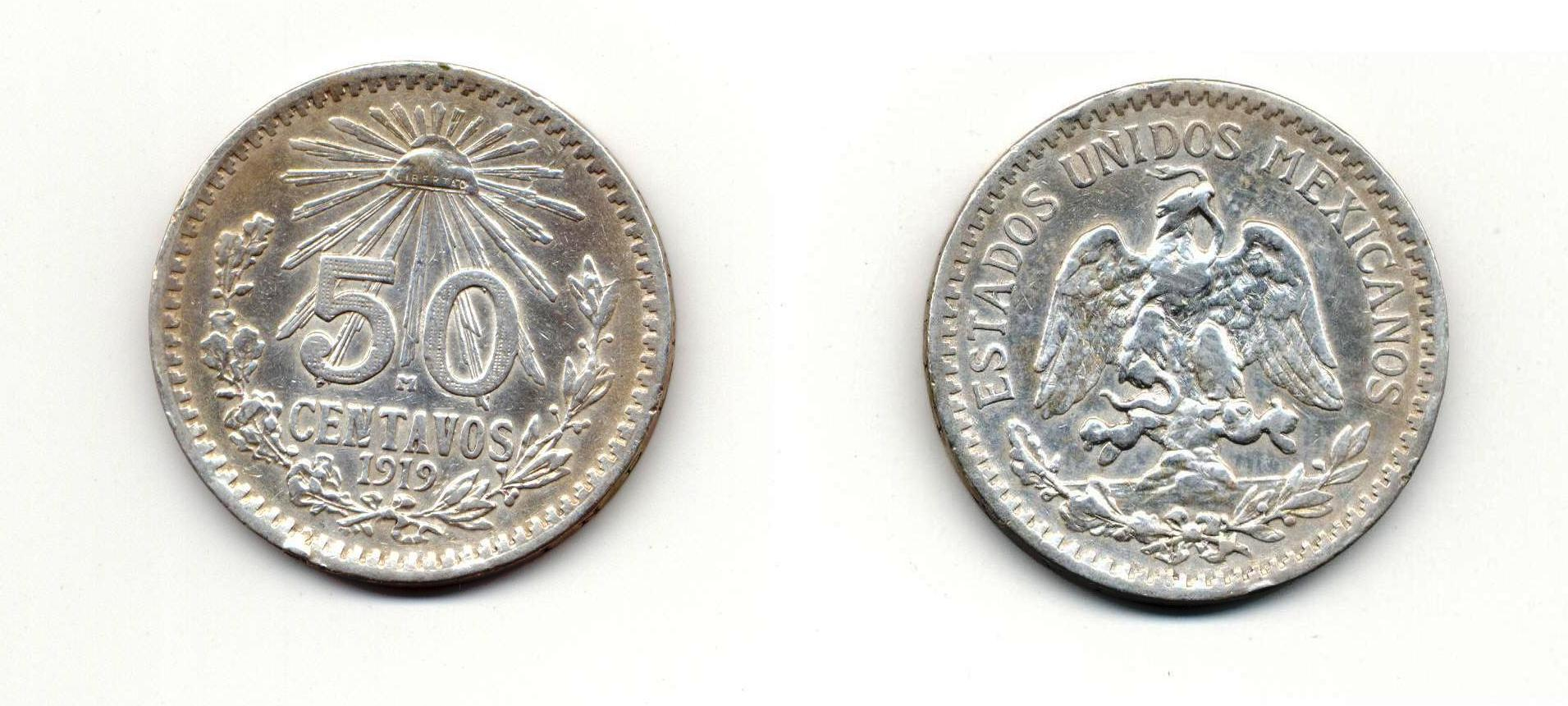
Tostón, or 50 centavos, 1919

In 1905 a monetary reform was carried out in which the gold content of the peso was reduced by 49.36% and the silver coins were (with the exception of the 1-peso) reduced to token issues. Bronze 1 and 2 centavos, nickel 5 centavos, silver 10, 20, and 50 centavos and gold 5 and 10 pesos were issued.

In 1910, a new peso coin was issued, known as the Caballito. The obverse had the Mexican official coat of arms (an eagle with a snake in its beak, standing on a cactus plant) and the legends "Estados Unidos Mexicanos" and "Un Peso". The reverse showed a woman riding a horse, her hand lifted high in exhortation holding a torch, and the date. These were minted in .903 fineness silver from 1910 to 1914.

In 1947, a new issue of silver coins was struck, with the 50 centavo and 1 peso in .500 fineness and a new 5-peso coin in .900 fineness. A portrait of José María Morelos appeared on the 1 peso, with Cuauhtémoc appearing on the 5-peso; and this was to remain a feature of the 1 peso coin until its demise. The silver content of this series was 5.4 g to the peso. This was reduced to 4 g in 1950, when .300 fineness 25 and 50 centavo, and 1 peso coins were minted alongside .720 fineness 5 pesos. A new portrait of Morelos appeared on the 1 peso, with Cuauhtemoc now on the 50 centavo and Miguel Hidalgo on the 5 peso coins. No reference was made to the silver content except on the 5 peso coin. During this period 5 peso, and to a lesser extent, 10 peso coins were also used as vehicles for occasional commemorative strikings.

100 pesos of the old Mexican peso, 1988 (Series A)

Between 1960 and 1971, new coinage was introduced, consisting of brass 1 and 5 centavos, cupro-nickel 10, 25, and 50 centavos, 1, 5, and 10 pesos, and silver 25 pesos (only issued 1968 and 1972). In 1977, silver 100 pesos were issued for circulation. In 1980, smaller 5 peso coins were introduced alongside 20 pesos and (from 1982) 50-pesos in cupro-nickel. Between 1978 and 1982, the sizes of the coins for 20 centavos and above were reduced. Base metal 100, 200, 500, 1,000, and 5,000 peso coins were introduced between 1984 and 1988.

==== Series AA coins ====
c. 1970 (Series AA)
Value	Images		Technical parameters			Description			Minting history	
Value	Obverse	Reverse	Diameter	Weight	Composition	Edge	Obverse	Reverse	Year	Quantity
MXP 1¢			19.5 mm	3 g	Copper (95%)	Plain	State title, coat of arms	Denomination	1905	
MXP 1¢			13.0 mm	1.50 g	Brass	Plain	State title, coat of arms	Three ears of wheat	1970	
MXP 2¢			25 mm	6 g	Copper (95%)	Plain	State title, coat of arms	Denomination	1905	
MXP 5¢			20 mm	5 g	Nickel	Milled	State title, coat of arms	Denomination	1905	
MXP 5¢			28 mm	9 g	Copper (95%)	Milled	State title, coat of arms	Denomination	1914	
MXP 5¢			18.0 mm	2.75 g	Brass	Plain	Josefa Ortiz de Domínguez, La Corregidora	Denomination	1970	
MXP 10¢			30.5 mm	12 g	Copper (95%)	Milled	State title, coat of arms	Denomination	1919	
MXP 10¢			15.0 mm	1.5 g	Cupronickel	Reeded	State title, coat of arms	Ear of corn	1974	
MXP 20¢			28.5 mm	10.0 g	Copper (95%)	Plain	State title, coat of arms	Phrygian cap, Pyramid of the Sun	1943	
MXP 20¢			20.0 mm	3.0 g	Cupronickel	Milled	State title, coat of arms	Don Francisco I. Madero	1974	
MXP 20¢			20.0 mm	2.97 g	Brass	Milled	State title, coat of arms	Olmec colossal head	1983	
MXP 50¢			25.0 mm	6.5 g	Cupronickel	Milled	State title, coat of arms	Cuauhtémoc in ceremonial helmet	1970	
MXP 50¢			22.0 mm	4.1 g	Stainless steel	Plain	State title, coat of arms	Profile of Kʼinich Janaabʼ Pakal	1983	
MXP $1			29.0 mm	9.0 g	Cupronickel	Milled	State title, coat of arms	General Don José María Morelos	1970	
MXP $5			33.0 mm	14.0 g	Cupronickel	Plain with inscription "INDEPENDENCIA Y LIBERTAD"	State title, coat of arms	General Vicente Guerrero	1971	
MXP $5			27.0 mm	10.2 g	Cupronickel	Plain with inscription "INDEPENDENCIA Y LIBERTAD"	State title, coat of arms	Feathered serpent sculpture from the Temple of the Feathered Serpent	1980	
MXP $10			30.5 mm, seven-sided	10.0 g	Cupronickel	Plain	State title, coat of arms	Miguel Hidalgo y Costilla	1974	
MXP $20			32.0 mm	15.1 g	Cupronickel	Plain with inscription "INDEPENDENCIA Y LIBERTAD"	State title, coat of arms	Cultura Maya, sculpture of Mesoamerican ballgame player	1980	
MXP $50			35.0 mm	19.8 g	Cupronickel	Milled	State title, coat of arms	Coyolxauhqui Stone	1982	
MXP $200			29.5 mm	17.0 g	Cupronickel	Plain with inscription "INDEPENDENCIA Y LIBERTAD"	State title, coat of arms	175th anniversary of independence, Angel of Independence and portraits of Ignacio Allende, Miguel Hidalgo y Costilla, José María Morelos y Pavón, and Vicente Guerrero	1985	
MXP $200			29.5 mm	17.0 g	Cupronickel	Plain with inscription "TIERRA Y LIBERTAD"	State title, coat of arms	75th anniversary of Revolution, Monumento a la Revolución and portraits of Don Venustiano Carranza, Emiliano Zapata, Francisco I. Madero, and Francisco Villa	1985	
MXP $200			29.5 mm	17.0 g	Cupronickel	Milled	State title, coat of arms	Copa Mundial	1986	
These images are to scale at 2.5 pixels per millimetre. For table standards, see the coin specification table.

==== Series A coins ====
c. 1984 (Series A)
Value	Images		Technical parameters			Description			Minting history	
Value	Obverse	Reverse	Diameter	Weight	Composition	Edge	Obverse	Reverse	Year	Quantity
MXP $1			24.5 mm	5.9 g	Stainless steel	Interrupted milled	State title, coat of arms	General Don José María Morelos	1984	
MXP $5			17.0 mm	3.1 g	Brass	Milled	State title, coat of arms	Value & date of minting	1985	
MXP $10			19.0 mm	3.8 g	Stainless steel	Interrupted milled	State title, coat of arms	Miguel Hidalgo	1985	
MXP $20			21.0 mm	6.0 g	Brass	Milled	State title, coat of arms	Guadalupe Victoria	1985	
MXP $50			23.5 mm	8.6 g	Cupronickel	Milled	State title, coat of arms	Benito Juárez	1984	
MXP $50			23.5 mm	7.3 g	Stainless steel	Milled	State title, coat of arms	Benito Juárez	1984	
MXP $100			26.5 mm	11.8 g	Brass-aluminum	Milled	State title, coat of arms	Venustiano Carranza	1984	
MXP $500			28.5 mm	12.7 g	Cupronickel	Milled	State title, coat of arms	Don Francisco I. Madero	1986	
MXP $1000			31.0 mm	14.9 g	Brass-aluminum	Milled	State title, coat of arms	Juana de Asbaje	1988	
MXP $5000			33.5 mm	17.3 g	Cupronickel	Milled	State title, coat of arms	50th anniversary of the nationalization of petroleum production	1988	
These images are to scale at 2.5 pixels per millimetre. For table standards, see the coin specification table.

=== New peso coins ===
As noted above, the nuevo peso ("new peso") was the result of elevated rates of inflation in Mexico during the 1980s. In 1993, President Carlos Salinas de Gortari stripped three zeros from the peso, creating a parity of 1 new peso for 1,000 of the old ones. The prior coins, issued in the 1970s and 1980s, were designated A-type or AA-type and are no longer valid.

Coins of the new currency (dated 1992) were introduced in 1993 as the B-type or Series B in the following denominations:

- 5 and 10 centavos in stainless steel;
- 20 and 50 centavos in aluminum bronze (switched to stainless steel in 2009);
- Bimetallic 1, 2 and 5 nuevos pesos, with aluminum bronze centers and stainless steel rings; and
- Bimetallic 10, 20 and 50 nuevos pesos, with sterling silver (0.925 fine) centers and aluminum bronze rings.

In 1996, the word nuevo was removed from the coins, which are designated as the C-type or Series C. In 1997 regular-issue 10-peso coins were minted with base metal replacing the silver center. In 2000, commemorative 20-peso coins also began to be minted without silver. Though the 50- and 100-peso coins are the only currently circulating coinage in the world to contain any silver, they rarely circulate because their silver content of 1/2 troy ounce have exceeded 100 pesos in value since around 2010.

In 2003 the Banco de México began the gradual launch of a new series of bimetallic $100 coins. These number 32 – one for each of the nation's 31 states, plus Mexico City. While the obverse of these coins bears the traditional coat of arms of Mexico, their reverses show the individual coats of arms of the component states. The first states to be celebrated in this fashion were Zacatecas, Yucatán, Veracruz, and Tlaxcala. In circulation, they are extraordinarily rare, but their novelty value offsets the unease most users feel at having such a large amount of money in a single coin. Although the Bank has tried to encourage users to collect full sets of these coins, issuing special display folders for this purpose, the high cost involved has worked against them. Bullion versions of these coins are also available, with the outer ring made of gold instead of aluminum bronze.

The first C1-type coins were issued in 2020; in general, these are commemorative $20 coins. As of 2020, the coins most commonly encountered in circulation have face values of 50¢, $1, $2, $5, $10 and $20. The 5¢ coin has been withdrawn from circulation in 2002, while the 10¢, 20¢ and 50¢ coins have gradually dropped out of circulation due to their low value. Some commodities are priced in multiples of 10¢, but stores may choose to round the total prices to 1 peso. There is also a trend for supermarkets to ask customers to round up the total to the nearest 1 peso to automatically donate the difference to charities.

==== Series B coins ====
1992 (Series B)
Value	Images		Technical parameters			Description			Minting history	
Value	Obverse	Reverse	Diameter	Weight	Composition	Edge	Obverse	Reverse	Year	Quantity
5¢			15.5 mm	1.58 g	Stainless steel 16% ~ 18% chromium 0.75% nickel, maximum 0.12% carbon, maximum 1% silicon, maximum 1% manganese, maximum 0.03% sulfur, maximum 0.04% phosphorus, maximum remaining of iron	Plain	State title, coat of arms	Stylized image of the solar rays of the "Ring of the Quincunxes of the Sun Stone"	1992	136,800,000
10¢			17 mm	2.08 g	Stainless steel 16% ~ 18% chromium 0.75% nickel, maximum 0.12% carbon, maximum 1% silicon, maximum 1% manganese, maximum 0.03% sulfur, maximum 0.04% phosphorus, maximum remaining of iron	Plain	State title, coat of arms	Stylized image of the "Ring of the Sacrifice of the Sun Stone"	1992	
20¢			19.5 mm (shortest); Dodecagon	3.04 g	Aluminium bronze 92% copper 6% aluminium 2% nickel	Plain	State title, coat of arms	Stylized image of the "Thirteenth Acatl Day of the Sun Stone"	1992	
50¢			22 mm Dodecagon, notched	4.39 g	Aluminium bronze 92% copper 6% aluminium 2% nickel	Plain	State title, coat of arms	Stylized image of the "Ring of Acceptance of the Sun Stone"	1992	
N$1			21 mm	3.95 g R: 2.14 g C: 1.81 g	Ring: Stainless steel (as 10¢); Center: Aluminium bronze (as 50¢)	Plain	State title, coat of arms	Stylized image of the "Ring of Splendor of the Sun Stone"	1992	
N$2			23 mm	5.19 g R: 2.81 g C: 2.38 g	Ring: Stainless steel (as 10¢); Center: Aluminium bronze (as 50¢)	Plain	State title, coat of arms	Stylized image of the "Ring of the Days of the Sun Stone"	1992	
N$5			25.5 mm	7.07 g R: 3.82 g C: 3.25 g	Ring: Stainless steel (as 10¢); Center: Aluminium bronze (as 50¢)	Plain	State title, coat of arms	Stylized image of the "Ring of the Serpents of the Sun Stone"	1992	
N$10			28 mm	11.183 g R: 5.579 g C: 5.604 g	Ring: Aluminium bronze (as 50¢); Center: 92.5% silver (1/6 oz); 7.5% copper	Reeded edge	State title, coat of arms	Circle of the Sun Stone representing Tonatiuh with the fire mask.	1992	
$20			32 mm	16.996 g R: 8.59 g C: 8.406 g	Ring: Aluminium bronze (as 50¢); Center: 92.5% silver (1/4 oz); 7.5% copper	Segmented reeding	State title, coat of arms	Miguel Hidalgo	1993	
These images are to scale at 2.5 pixels per millimetre. For table standards, see the coin specification table.

==== Series C coins ====
1996 (Series C)
Value	Images		Technical parameters			Description			Minting history	
Value	Obverse	Reverse	Diameter	Weight	Composition	Edge	Obverse	Reverse	Year	Quantity
5¢			15.5 mm	1.58 g	Stainless steel	Plain	State title, coat of arms	Stylized image of the solar rays of the "Ring of the Quincunxes of the Sun Stone"	1996	
10¢			17 mm	2.08 g	Stainless steel	Plain	State title, coat of arms	Stylized image of the "Ring of the Sacrifice of the Sun Stone"	1996	
20¢			19.5 mm (shortest); Dodecagon	3.04 g	Aluminium bronze 92% copper 6% aluminium 2% nickel	Plain	State title, coat of arms	Stylized image of the "Thirteenth Acatl Day of the Sun Stone"	1996	
50¢			22 mm Dodecagon, notched	4.39 g	Aluminium bronze 92% copper 6% aluminium 2% nickel	Plain	State title, coat of arms	Stylized image of the "Ring of Acceptance of the Sun Stone"	1996	
$1			21 mm	3.95 g R: 2.14 g C: 1.81 g	Ring: Stainless steel (as 10¢); Center: Aluminium bronze (as 50¢)	Plain	State title, coat of arms	Stylized image of the "Ring of Splendor of the Sun Stone"	1996	
$2			23 mm	5.19 g R: 2.81 g C: 2.38 g	Ring: Stainless steel (as 10¢); Center: Aluminium bronze (as 50¢)	Plain	State title, coat of arms	Stylized image of the "Ring of the Days of the Sun Stone"	1996	
$5			25.5 mm	7.07 g R: 3.82 g C: 3.25 g	Ring: Stainless steel (as 10¢); Center: Aluminium bronze (as 50¢)	Plain	State title, coat of arms	Stylized image of the "Ring of the Serpents of the Sun Stone"	1996	
$10			28 mm	10.329 g R: 5.579 g C: 4.75 g	Ring: Aluminium bronze (as 50¢); Center: 65% copper 25% zinc 10% nickel	Reeded edge	State title, coat of arms	Circle of the Sun Stone representing Tonatiuh with the fire mask.	1997	
$20			32 mm	15.945 g R: 8.59 g C: 7.355 g	Ring: Aluminium bronze (as 50¢); Center: Cupronickel; 75% copper 25% nickel	Segmented reeding	State title, coat of arms	Octavio Paz	2000	
These images are to scale at 2.5 pixels per millimetre. For table standards, see the coin specification table.

==== Series D coins ====
Series D coins, introduced in 2009, replace the prior 10-, 20-, and 50-centavo coins from Series B and C; compared to the prior coinage, the Series D counterparts are made from the punched out cores of the rings used to make the 1-, 2- and 5-peso coins, hence their smaller size and stainless steel composition. This measure is designed to save money and resources in production. The edge of each denomination is different to aid in distinguishing them by touch.

2009 (Series D)
Value	Images		Technical parameters			Description			Minting history	
Value	Obverse	Reverse	Diameter	Weight	Composition	Edge	Obverse	Reverse	Year	Quantity
10¢			14 mm	1.755 g	Stainless steel 16% ~ 18% chromium 0.75% nickel, maximum 0.12% carbon, maximum 1% silicon, maximum 1% manganese, maximum 0.03% sulfur, maximum 0.04% phosphorus, maximum remaining of iron	Slotted	State title, coat of arms	Stylized image of the "Ring of the Sacrifice of the Sun Stone"	2009	
20¢			15.3 mm	2.258 g	Stainless steel 16% ~ 18% chromium 0.75% nickel, maximum 0.12% carbon, maximum 1% silicon, maximum 1% manganese, maximum 0.03% sulfur, maximum 0.04% phosphorus, maximum remaining of iron	Segmented reeding	State title, coat of arms	Stylized image of the "Thirteenth Acatl Day of the Sun Stone"	2009	
50¢			17 mm	3.103 g	Stainless steel 16% ~ 18% chromium 0.75% nickel, maximum 0.12% carbon, maximum 1% silicon, maximum 1% manganese, maximum 0.03% sulfur, maximum 0.04% phosphorus, maximum remaining of iron	Reeded edge	State title, coat of arms	Stylized image of the "Ring of Acceptance of the Sun Stone"	2009	
These images are to scale at 2.5 pixels per millimetre. For table standards, see the coin specification table.

==== Special and commemorative coins ====
Commemorative Coins (selected)
Value	Images		Technical parameters			Description			Minting history	
Value	Obverse	Reverse	Diameter	Weight	Composition	Edge	Obverse	Reverse	Year	Quantity
$5 (C)			25.5 mm	7.07 g R: 3.82 g C: 3.25 g	Ring: Stainless steel (as 10¢); Center: Aluminium bronze (as 50¢)	Reeded edge	State title, coat of arms	2010 Bicentennial (Independence) & Centennial (Revolution) series	2008–2010	
$10 (C)			28 mm	10.329 g R: 5.579 g C: 4.75 g	Ring: Aluminium bronze (as 50¢); Center: 65% copper 25% zinc 10% nickel	Inscription	State title, coat of arms	Value, Tonatiuh from the Aztec sun stone at the center, "AÑO 2000" or "AÑO 2001" instead of "DIEZ PESOS" as commemorative legend	2000	
$20 (C)			32 mm	15.945 g R: 8.59 g C: 7.355 g	Ring: Aluminium bronze (as 50¢); Center: Cupronickel; 75% copper 25% nickel	Milled	State title, coat of arms	Xiuhtecuhtli Year 2000, Aztec "New Fire" ceremony	2000	
$20 (C1)			30 mm Dodecagon	12.67 g R: 7.16 g C: 5.51 g	Ring: Aluminium bronze (as 50¢); Center: Cupronickel; 65% copper 10% nickel 25% zinc	Milled	State title, coat of arms	700th anniversary of the lunar foundation of the city of Mexico-Tenochtitlan; Eagle from the Teocalli of the Sacred War and moon	2021	
$20 (C1)			30 mm Dodecagon	12.67 g R: 7.16 g C: 5.51 g	Ring: Aluminium bronze (as 50¢); Center: Cupronickel; 65% copper 10% nickel 25% zinc	Milled	State title, coat of arms	500th anniversary of historical memory of Mexico-Tenochtitlan; Mexico City Metropolitan Cathedral and Templo Mayor	2021	
$20 (C1)			30 mm Dodecagon	12.67 g R: 7.16 g C: 5.51 g	Ring: Aluminium bronze (as 50¢); Center: Cupronickel; 65% copper 10% nickel 25% zinc	Milled	State title, coat of arms	Bicentennial of Mexico's Independence; profiles of Miguel Hidalgo, Jose Maria Morelos, and Vicente Guerrero	2021	
N$50 (B)			39 mm	33.967 g R: 17.155 g C: 16.812 g	Ring: Aluminium bronze (as 50¢); Center: 92.5% silver (1/2 oz); 7.5% copper	Reeded edge	State title, coat of arms	Value, the Hero Cadets of the Battle of Chapultepec	1993	
$100 (C)			39 mm	33.967 g R: 17.155 g C: 16.812 g	Ring: Aluminium bronze (as 50¢); Center: 92.5% silver (1/2 oz); 7.5% copper	Intermittent milling	State title, coat of arms	Coats of arms of the 31 States of Mexico and the Federal District (In reverse alphabetical order)	2003–2005	
$100 (C)			39 mm	33.967 g R: 17.155 g C: 16.812 g	Ring: Aluminium bronze (as 50¢); Center: 92.5% silver (1/2 oz); 7.5% copper	Intermittent milling	State title, coat of arms	Culture of the states (e.g. architecture, wildlife, flora, art, science, dances) (In normal alphabetical order)	2005–2007	
These images are to scale at 2.5 pixels per millimetre. For table standards, see the coin specification table.

== Banknotes ==
=== First ===
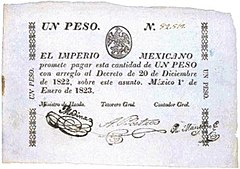
Front of the Imperial Mexican Peso

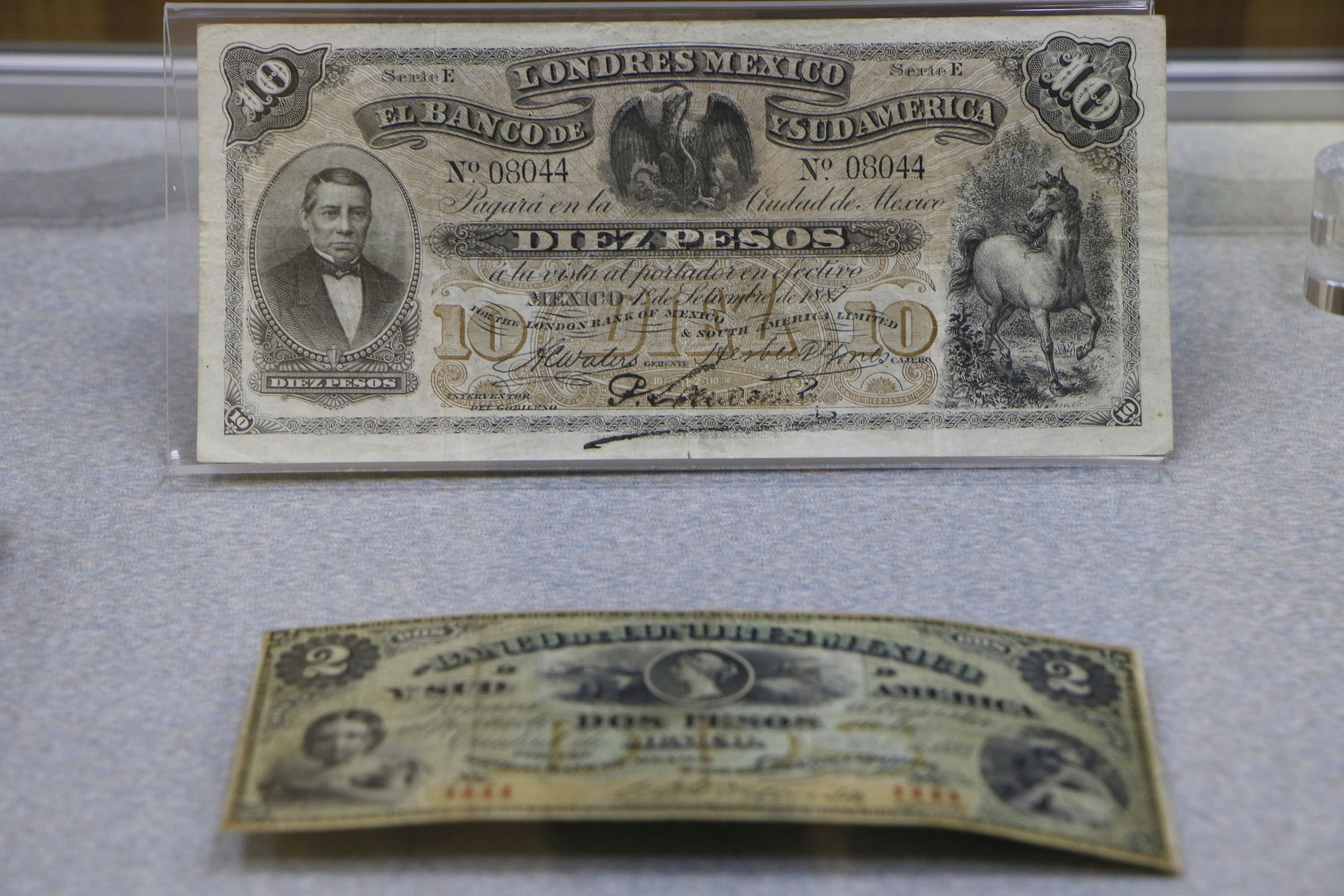
A ten-peso banknote of the London Bank of Mexico and South America at the National Numismatic Museum, Mexico City

The first banknotes issued by the Mexican state were produced between 1822 and 1823 by Emperor Agustin de Iturbide in denominations of 1, 2 and 10 pesos. Similar issues were made by the republican government later in 1823. Ten-pesos notes were also issued by Emperor Maximilian in 1866 but, until the 1920s, banknote production lay entirely in the hands of private banks and local authorities.

In 1920, the Monetary Commission (Comisión Monetaria) issued 50-centavos and 1-peso notes whilst the Bank of Mexico (Banco de México) issued 2-pesos notes. From 1925, the Bank issued notes for 5, 10, 20, 50 and 100 pesos, with 500 and 1000 pesos following in 1931. From 1935, the Bank also began issuing a new series of banknotes (Series AA) including 1-peso notes and, from 1945, 10,000 pesos. These notes were printed by the American Bank Note Company. The banknote of 10,000 pesos was kept in circulation between 1945 and 1956 and was put into circulation again in 1979, being replaced by the 10,000 banknotes that would come into circulation in 1982.

A new series of notes were printed and issued by the Bank of Mexico, starting in 1969 (again as Series AA) with 10 pesos, followed by 5 pesos in 1971, 20 and 50 pesos in 1973, 100 pesos in 1975, 1,000 pesos in 1978, 500 pesos in 1979 and 10,000 pesos in 1982. These were the first notes to be printed directly by Banco de México.

Production of 1-peso notes ceased in 1970, followed by 5 pesos in 1972, 10 and 20 pesos in 1977, 50 pesos in 1984, 100 pesos in 1985, 500 pesos in 1987 and 1,000 pesos in 1988. A new series (Series A) were issued starting from 1980: 5,000-pesos notes were introduced in 1980, followed by 2,000 pesos in 1983, 20,000 pesos in 1985, 50,000 pesos in 1986 and 100,000 pesos in 1991.

==== Series AA ====
Series AA banknotes printed by the American Bank Note Company (1936)
Image		Value	Dimensions (millimeters)	Design		Date of	
Obverse	Reverse	Value	Dimensions (millimeters)	Obverse	Reverse	issue	withdrawal
		MXP $1	157 × 67 mm	Aztec sun stone	Angel of Independence	1936	1970
		MXP $5	157 × 67 mm	Portrait of an Algerian young woman, popularly known as "the gipsy"	Angel of Independence	1937	1971
		MXP $10	157 × 67 mm	Portrait of a young woman wearing the typical costume of Zapotec women from Oaxaca, known as "la Tehuana"	Landscape painting of the City of Guanajuato by Carl Nebel	1937	1969
		MXP $20	157 × 67 mm	Josefa Ortiz de Domínguez	Cloister of the Convent of San Agustín in Querétaro	1937	1973
		MXP $50	157 × 67 mm	Ignacio Allende	Angel of Independence	1941	1973
		MXP $100	157 × 67 mm	Miguel Hidalgo	Coat of arms of Mexico	1945	1975
		MXP $500	157 × 67 mm	José María Morelos	Façade of the Palace of Mines in Mexico City	1936	1979
		MXP $1,000	157 × 67 mm	Cuauhtémoc	El Castillo at Chichen Itza	1936	1978
		MXP $10,000	157 × 67 mm	Matías Romero	Façade of the National Palace and Zócalo	1943	1982

Series AA banknotes printed by the Bank of Mexico (1969)
Value	Dimensions (millimeters)	Design		Date of
Value	Dimensions (millimeters)	Obverse	Reverse	issue
MXP $5	157 × 67 mm	Josefa Ortiz de Domínguez, eagle devouring a rattlesnake	Querétaro Aqueduct	19 July 1971
MXP $10	157 × 67 mm	Miguel Hidalgo, bell of Dolores	Dolores Hidalgo parish	15 December 1969
MXP $20	157 × 66 mm	José María Morelos, Colegio de San Nicolás Obispo	Temple of the Feathered Serpent in Teotihuacan	28 May 1973
MXP $50	157 × 67 mm	Benito Juárez, National Palace	Zapotec funerary urn and temple at Mitla.	15 November 1973
MXP $100	157 × 67 mm	Venustiano Carranza, fragment of La trinchera by José Clemente Orozco	Chacmool	19 November 1975
MXP $500	157 × 67 mm	Francisco I. Madero	Aztec sun stone	19 November 1979
MXP $1,000	157 × 67 mm	Sor Juana Inés de la Cruz	Plaza de Santo Domingo, Mexico City	11 December 1978

==== Series A ====
Series A banknotes (1980)
Value	Dimensions (millimeters)	Design		Date of issue
Value	Dimensions (millimeters)	Obverse	Reverse	Date of issue
MXP $2,000	157 × 67 mm	Justo Sierra, UNAM's Central Library	Royal and Pontifical University of Mexico during the 19th century.	28 November 1983
MXP $5,000	157 × 67 mm	Niños Héroes, emblem of the San Blas Battalion	Chapultepec Castle, badge of the Heroic Military Academy	12 September 1980
MXP $10,000	157 × 67 mm	Lázaro Cárdenas, La Cangrejera refinery	Templo Mayor discoveries, Coyolxauhqui	18 March 1982
MXP $20,000	157 × 67 mm	Andrés Quintana Roo, Tulum	Mural of Bonampak, Yaxchilan Lintel 25	13 November 1985
MXP $50,000	157 × 67 mm	Cuauhtémoc	The fusion of two cultures by Jorge González Camarena	2 December 1986
MXP $100,000	157 × 67 mm	Plutarco Elías Calles, façade of the Bank of Mexico building	Guaymas Bay and white-tailed deer	2 September 1991

=== Second peso ===
==== Series B ====
In 1993, notes were introduced in the new currency for 10, 20, 50, and 100 nuevos pesos. These notes are designated series B by the Bank of Mexico (Banco de México). (This series designation is not the 1 or 2 letter series label printed on the banknotes themselves.) All were printed with the date July 31, 1992. The designs were carried over from the corresponding notes of the old peso.

Value	Dimensions (millimeters)	Design		Date of issue
Value	Dimensions (millimeters)	Obverse	Reverse	Date of issue
MXN N$10	155 × 66 mm	Lázaro Cárdenas, La Cangrejera refinery	Templo Mayor, Coyolxauhqui	1 January 1993
MXN N$20	155 × 66 mm	Andrés Quintana Roo, Tulum	Mural of Bonampak, Yaxchilan Lintel 25	1 January 1993
MXN N$50	155 × 66 mm	Cuauhtémoc	The fusion of two cultures by Jorge González Camarena	1 January 1993
MXN N$100	155 × 66 mm	Plutarco Elías Calles, façade of the Bank of Mexico building	Guaymas Bay and white-tailed deer	1 January 1993

==== Series C ====
All Series C notes had brand new designs and were printed with the date December 10, 1993, but they were not issued until October 1994. The word "nuevos" remained, and banknotes in denominations of 200 and 500 nuevos pesos were added. The 500 nuevos pesos note was worth more than US$100 when it was introduced, but its value dropped to almost equal to $100 by the end of 1994.

Value	Dimensions (millimeters)	Design		Date of issue
Value	Dimensions (millimeters)	Obverse	Reverse	Date of issue
MXN N$10	129 × 66 mm	Emiliano Zapata, hands holding ears of maize	Statue of Zapata in Cuautla, Popocatépetl and Iztaccíhuatl	3 October 1994
MXN N$20	129 × 66 mm	Benito Juárez, coat of arms of the Second Federal Republic of Mexico	Benito Juárez Hemicycle, Mexico City	3 October 1994
MXN N$50	129 × 66 mm	José María Morelos, flag used by Morelos at the Mexican War of Independence	Scene from Lake Pátzcuaro, Michoacán	3 October 1994
MXN N$100	155 × 66 mm	Nezahualcóyotl	Sculpture of Xōchipilli, sculpture of Xiuhcoatl	3 October 1994
MXN N$200	155 × 66 mm	Sor Juana Inés de la Cruz, a book, an inkwell and her library	Façade of the Temple of San Jerónimo	3 October 1994
MXN N$500	155 × 66 mm	Ignacio Zaragoza, fragment of Fuertes combates sostenidos en los cerros de Loreto y Guadalupe by Josep Cusachs	Puebla Cathedral	3 October 1994

==== Series D ====
The next series of banknotes, designated Series D, was introduced in 1996. It is a modified version of Series C with the word "nuevos" dropped, the bank title changed from "El Banco de México" to "Banco de México" and the clause "pagará a la vista al portador" (Pay at sight to the bearer) removed. While series D includes the $10 note and is still legal tender, they are no longer printed, are seldom seen, and the coin is more common. $10 notes are rarely found in circulation. There are several printed dates for each denomination.

In 2000, a commemorative series was issued which was based on Series D with the additional text "75 aniversario 1925-2000" under the bank title, which refers to the 75th anniversary of the establishment of the Bank.

Starting from 2001, each denomination in the series was updated. MXN $50, $100, $200, and $500 were the first to be upgraded starting from October 15, 2001; in an effort to combat counterfeiting, these notes were modified with the addition of an iridescent strip. On notes of 100 pesos and greater, the denomination is printed in color-shifting ink in the top right corner. On September 30, 2002, a new $20 note was introduced. The new $20 is printed on longer-lasting polymer plastic rather than paper, and lacks the iridescent strip, but includes a clear window. A new $1000 note was issued on November 15, 2004, which was worth about US$88 upon introduction. The Bank of Mexico refers to these upgraded banknotes during this wave of change as "Series D1".

Series D
Value	Dimensions (millimeters)	Main Color	Design		Dates of		
Value	Dimensions (millimeters)	Main Color	Obverse	Reverse	Printing	Issue	Withdrawal
MXN $10	129 × 66 mm	Aqua	Emiliano Zapata, hands holding ears of maize	Statue of Zapata in Cuautla, Popocatépetl and Iztaccíhuatl	6 May 1994	1 January 1996	1997
MXN $20	129 × 66 mm	Blue	Benito Juárez, coat of arms of the Second Federal Republic of Mexico	Benito Juárez Hemicycle in Mexico City	6 May 1994; 17 May 2001 (polymer)	1 January 1996; 30 September 2002	current
MXN $50	129 × 66 mm	Magenta	José María Morelos, flag used by Morelos at the Mexican War of Independence	Scene from Lake Pátzcuaro, Michoacán	6 May 1994; 18 October 2000 (iridescent)	1 January 1996; 15 October 2001	current
MXN $100	155 × 66 mm	Red	Nezahualcóyotl	Sculpture of Xōchipilli, sculpture of Xiuhcoatl	6 May 1994; 18 October 2000 (color shifting) ? (raised ink)	1 January 1996; 15 October 2001; 19 December 2005	current
MXN $200	155 × 66 mm	Green	Sor Juana Inés de la Cruz, a book, an inkwell and her library	Façade of the Temple of San Jerónimo	7 February 1995; 18 October 2000 (color shifting) ? (raised ink)	1 January 1996; 15 October 2001; 19 December 2005	current
MXN $500	155 × 66 mm	Brown	Ignacio Zaragoza, fragment of Fuertes combates sostenidos en los cerros de Loreto y Guadalupe by Josep Cusachs	Puebla Cathedral	7 February 1995; 18 October 2000 (color shifting) ? (raised ink)	1 January 1996; 15 October 2001; 19 December 2005	current
MXN $1,000	155 × 66 mm	Purple	Miguel Hidalgo, bell of Dolores	University of Guanajuato, Baratillo Fountain	26 March 2002	15 November 2004	current

On April 5, 2004, the Chamber of Deputies approved an initiative to demand that the Bank of Mexico produce by January 1, 2006, notes and coins that are identifiable by the blind population (estimated at more than 750,000 visually impaired citizens, including 250,000 who are completely blind).

Value	Image	Description of pattern	Series	
Value	Image	Description of pattern	D1	F
$100		Five parallel diagonal lines, with a negative slope, each broken up into three segments.	Yes	Yes
$200		Broken square pattern with outlines at each corner.	Yes	Yes
$500		Four parallel horizontal lines, each broken up into three segments.	Yes	Yes
$1000		Two concentric circles, each formed by four broken lines, and a central dot.	No	Yes

On December 19, 2005, $100, $200, and $500 MXN banknotes in Series D1 were printed, including raised, tactile patterns, meant to make them distinguishable for people with vision incapacities. This system has been questioned and many demand that it be replaced by actual Braille so it can be used by foreign visitors to Mexico not used to these symbols. The Banco de México said will continue issuing the symbol bills. The tactile patterns would be continued for Series F and a fourth pattern was added to the MXN $1,000 note.

==== Series F ====
In September 2006, the gradual introduction of a new family of banknotes (known as Series F or Type-F) was announced. The 50-peso denomination was launched in November 2006. The 20-peso note was launched in August 2007. The 1,000-peso note was launched in March 2008. The $200 was issued in 2008, and the $100 and $500 notes were released in August 2010. In Series F, the 20 and 50-peso notes are printed on polymer and include clear windows; all denominations include a color-shifting element. For 100-peso notes and greater, a 3D/dynamic thread is included; this thread has holographic images of snails which shift orthogonally relative to the motion of the note, so they will move side to side if the bill is moved up and down, for instance.

Series F included the tactile patterns created by intaglio printing from Series D to distinguish denominations starting at 100 pesos; the 20 and 50-peso notes had the value embossed directly in the clear windows. In addition, Series F denominations are distinguishable by length. Each denomination is longer than the lower by 7 mm (0.28 in), and a plastic clipboard was distributed free of charge starting in November 2012, which included raised measurement marks and Braille characters to assist the visually impaired.

A revised $50 note, with improved security features, was released on May 6, 2013, and is known as Type F1.

Series F
Image		Value	Dimensions (millimeters)	Main color	Description		Dates of		
Obverse	Reverse	Value	Dimensions (millimeters)	Main color	Obverse	Reverse	Printing	Issue	Withdrawal
		$20	120 × 66 mm	Blue	Benito Juárez, balancing scale and book	Monte Albán, mask of Cocijo	19 June 2006	20 August 2007	current
		$50	127 × 66 mm	Magenta	José María Morelos, flag used by Morelos at the Mexican War of Independence	Aqueduct of Morelia	5 November 2004; 12 June 2012 (F1)	21 November 2006; 6 May 2013 (F1)	current
		$100	134 × 66 mm	Red	Nezahualcóyotl	Representation of Templo Mayor aqueduct and central plaza of Tenochtitlan, glyph of Nezahualcóyotl		9 August 2010	current
		$200	141 × 66 mm	Green	Sor Juana Inés de la Cruz, books, an inkwell, two pens and a library window	Hacienda Panoaya in Amecameca, baptismal font and view of the Popocatépetl and Iztaccíhuatl	15 February 2008	8 September 2008	current
		$500	148 × 66 mm	Brown	Diego Rivera, Rivera's painting Desnudo con alcatraces, brushes and a palette	Frida Kahlo; Kahlo's painting The Love Embrace of the Universe, the Earth (Mexico), Myself, Diego, and Señor Xolotl		30 August 2010	current
		$1,000	155 × 66 mm	Purple	Miguel Hidalgo, bell of Dolores	University of Guanajuato		7 April 2008	current

==== Commemorative banknotes ====
On September 29, 2009, The Bank of Mexico unveiled a set of commemorative banknotes. The 100-peso denomination note commemorates the centennial of the Beginning of the Mexican Revolution (1910–1920). The 200-peso denomination note commemorates the bicentennial of the start of the Mexican War for Independence which began in 1810. There was a printing error in the $100 notes, in the small letters (almost unnoticeable, as they are very small and the same color as the waving lines), near the top right corner, just above the transparent corn, from the side of the "La Revolución contra la dictadura Porfiriana", it is written: "Sufragio electivo y no reelección" (Elective suffrage and no reelection), this supposed to be a quote to Francisco I. Madero's famous phrase, but he said "Sufragio efectivo no reelección" (Valid Suffrage, No Reelection). President Felipe Calderón made a newspaper announcement in which he apologized for this, and said that the notes were going to continue in circulation, and that they would retain their value.

Likewise, a 100-peso banknote that commemorates the 100th anniversary of the enactment of the Constitution of Mexico was unveiled and issued in 2017.

In 2019, the Bank of Mexico issued a new 200-peso banknote of the Series G issues, but containing a special overprint referencing the 25th Anniversary of the Bank of Mexico's Autonomy from the Federal Government.

Commemorative notes from Series F and G
Images		Value	Dimensions (millimeters)	Main Color	Design		Date of		
Obverse	Reverse	Value	Dimensions (millimeters)	Main Color	Obverse	Reverse	Printing	Issue	Withdrawal
		$100	134 × 66 mm	Red	Steam locomotive	Del Porfirismo a la Revolución (From the Dictatorship of Porfirio Díaz to the Revolution) by David Alfaro Siqueiros		23 September 2009	current
		$200	141 × 66 mm	Green	Miguel Hidalgo carrying a banner that became the flag of the Insurgents	Angel of Independence located in Mexico City on the Paseo de la Reforma		23 September 2009	current
		$100	134 × 66 mm	Red	President Venustiano Carranza and Chairman of Congress Luis Manuel Rojas being sworn in before the Constituent Assembly after amending the Constitution (1917).	Congressmen swearing to observe and enforce the Mexican Constitution.		5 February 2017	current

==== Series G ====
In August 2018 a new series of notes started circulating. New anti-counterfeiting measures were implemented. The obverse of the notes portrays important historical eras and individuals. The reverse of the notes portrays the various ecosystems of the country through one of the World Heritage sites of Mexico.

This series was not originally intended to include a $20 note, since it would gradually be replaced by a coin, but a $20 note to commemorate the bicentennial of Mexican independence was issued in September 2021. Prior to the introduction of the $20 note, each denomination corresponded to a different era in Mexican history, progressing chronologically as the value increased. The 20, 50, and 100-peso notes are produced in polymer, while the other banknotes are printed on paper. Should there be a need, Banco de México will introduce a $2,000 note.

The previous intaglio symbols were dropped from Series G. Instead, the upper left and right edges of the 200, 500, and 1000-peso notes have tactile parallel horizontal lines for identification by touch. 200-peso notes have two lines; 500 and 1000-peso notes have three and four, respectively. The value of the 20, 50, and 100-peso notes are embossed in the clear windows of the corresponding notes, along with a distinctive pattern.

Series G notes also retain the same 7 mm (0.28 in) incremental length increase between denominations from Series F, starting with the MXN $50 note, which is 125 mm (4.9 in) long; exceptions include the commemorative MXN $20 Series G note, which is 120 mm (4.7 in) long, and the planned $2,000 note, which will be 6 mm (0.24 in) longer than the $1,000 note. A new version of the sizing clipboard, compatible with both Series F and G, was issued starting in September 2019.

This series of banknotes became popular collectibles with the general public due to their design. The $50 banknote proved particularly popular, driven primarily by the inclusion of an axolotl on the reverse. As of 2025, the Bank of Mexico estimated that collectors were keeping $12.5 million worth of $50 banknotes out of circulation.

Series G banknotes (2018)
Image		Value	Dimensions (millimeters)	Main color	Design		Dates of		
Obverse	Reverse	Value	Dimensions (millimeters)	Main color	Obverse	Reverse	Printing	Issue	Withdrawal
		$20	120 × 65 mm	Red and green	Bicentennial of Mexican Independence; triumphant Army of the Three Guarantees entering Mexico City	Mangrove ecosystem represented by the Mexican crocodile, roseate spoonbill, and Sian Ka'an Biosphere Reserve.	6 January 2021	24 September 2021	current
		$50	125 × 65 mm	Magenta	Pre-Hispanic Mexico; Foundation of Tenochtitlan	Riparian and lake ecosystems represented by the axolotl and Xochimilco	31 March 2021	28 October 2021	current
		$100	132 × 65 mm	Red	New Spain; Sor Juana Inés de la Cruz	Temperate forest ecosystems represented by the monarch butterfly and the Monarch Butterfly Biosphere Reserve	8 May 2020	12 November 2020	current
		$200	139 × 65 mm	Green	Independent Mexico; Miguel Hidalgo and José María Morelos y Pavón	Desert and matorral ecosystems represented by the golden eagle and El Pinacate y Gran Desierto de Altar Biosphere Reserve	28 November 2018	2 September 2019	current
		$500	146 × 65 mm	Blue	La Reforma and restoration of the Republic; Benito Juárez	Coastal, marine and insular ecosystems represented by the gray whale and El Vizcaíno Biosphere Reserve	19 May 2017	27 August 2018	current
		$1,000	153 × 65 mm	Gray	Mexican Revolution; Francisco I. Madero, Hermila Galindo and Carmen Serdán	Tropical humid-forest ecosystems represented by the jaguar and Calakmul Biosphere Reserve	10 June 2019	19 November 2020	current
		$2,000	159 × 65 mm	Yellow	Contemporary Mexico; Octavio Paz and Rosario Castellanos	Dry forest ecosystems represented by the Mexican long-nosed bat and Tequila agave landscape		Only if necessary	current

== Use outside Mexico ==
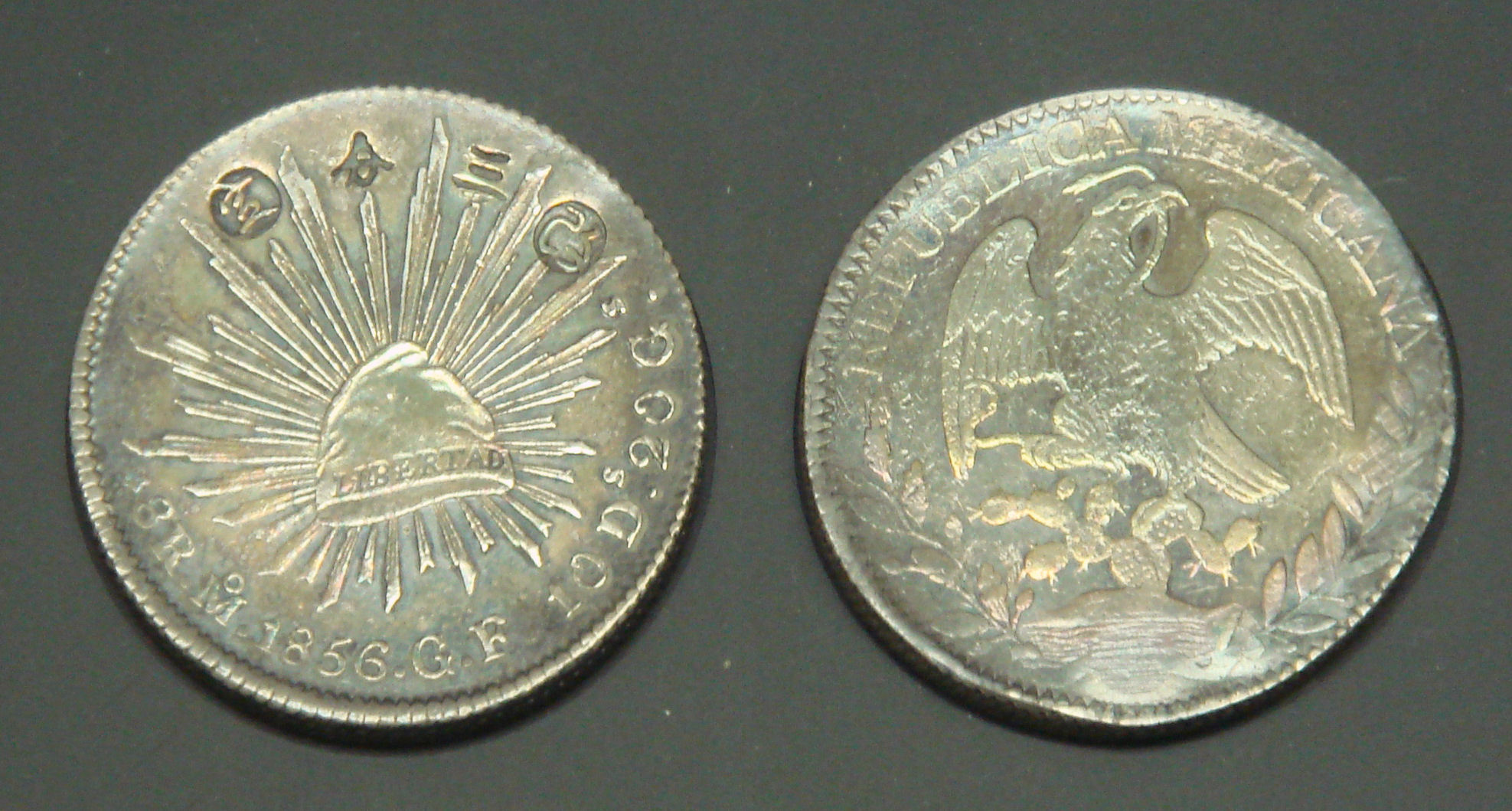
A Mexican dollar used as currency in Tokugawa Japan, countermarked with "Aratame sanbu sadame" (改三分定, fixed to the value of 3 bu)

=== 19th century ===
The Spanish dollar and Mexican peso served as a global silver standard reserve currency, recognized all over Europe, Asia and the Americas from the 16th to 20th centuries. They were legal tender in the United States until 1857 and in China until 1935.

The 18th and 19th century Spanish dollar and Mexican peso were widely used in the early United States. On July 6, 1785, the value of the United States dollar was set by decree to approximately match the Spanish dollar. Both were based on the silver content of the coins.

The first U.S. dollar coins were not issued until April 2, 1792, and the peso continued to be officially recognized and used in the United States, along with other foreign coins, until February 21, 1857. In Canada, it remained legal tender, along with other foreign silver coins, until 1854 and continued to circulate beyond that date.

The Mexican peso also served as the model for the Straits dollar (now the Singapore dollar/Brunei dollar), the Malaysian ringgit, the Hong Kong dollar, the Japanese yen, the Korean won, and the Chinese yuan. The Chinese word "yuan" means "round", describing the Spanish dollars, Mexican "cap-and-ray" pesos and other silver dollars used in China from the 18th to 20th centuries. The Mexican peso was also briefly legal tender in 19th century Siam, where government mints were unable to accommodate a sudden influx of foreign traders, and was exchanged at a rate of three pesos to five Thai baht.

=== 21st century ===
Some establishments in border areas of the United States accept Mexican pesos as currency, such as certain border Walmart stores, certain border gas stations such as Circle K, and the La Bodega supermarkets in San Ysidro on the Tijuana border. In 2007, Pizza Patrón, a chain of pizza restaurants in the southwestern part of the U.S., started to accept the currency, sparking controversy in the United States.

Current MXN exchange rates
From Google Finance:	AUD CAD CHF CNY EUR GBP HKD JPY USD CAD EUR JPY
From Yahoo! Finance:	AUD CAD CHF CNY EUR GBP HKD JPY USD CAD EUR JPY
From XE.com:	AUD CAD CHF CNY EUR GBP HKD JPY USD CAD EUR JPY
From OANDA:	AUD CAD CHF CNY EUR GBP HKD JPY USD CAD EUR JPY

== See also ==
- Cash
- Colombian peso
- Economy of Mexico
- Inflation hedge
- Mexican peso crisis
- Mexican Gold and Silver Libertad coins
- Peso
