= Simó Gómez =

Spanish painter

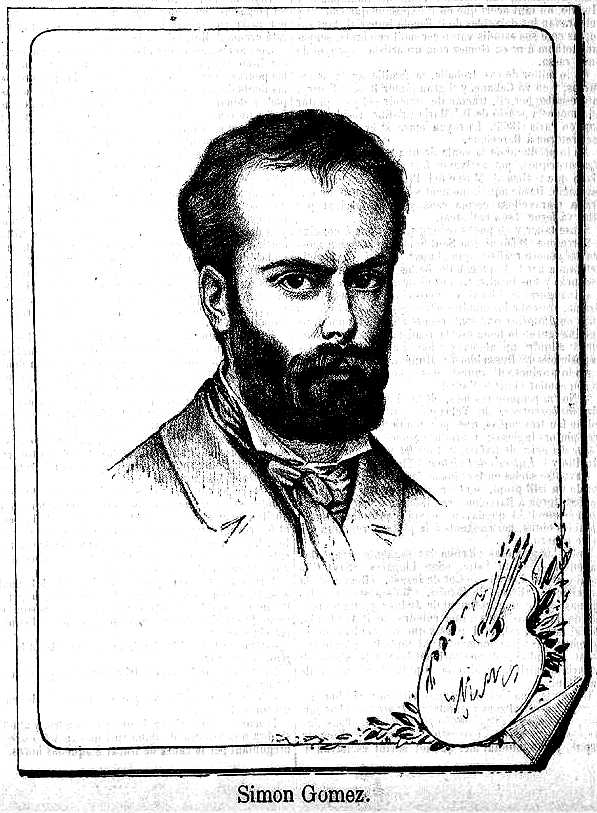
Simó Gómez. From L'Esquella de la Torratxa (1880)

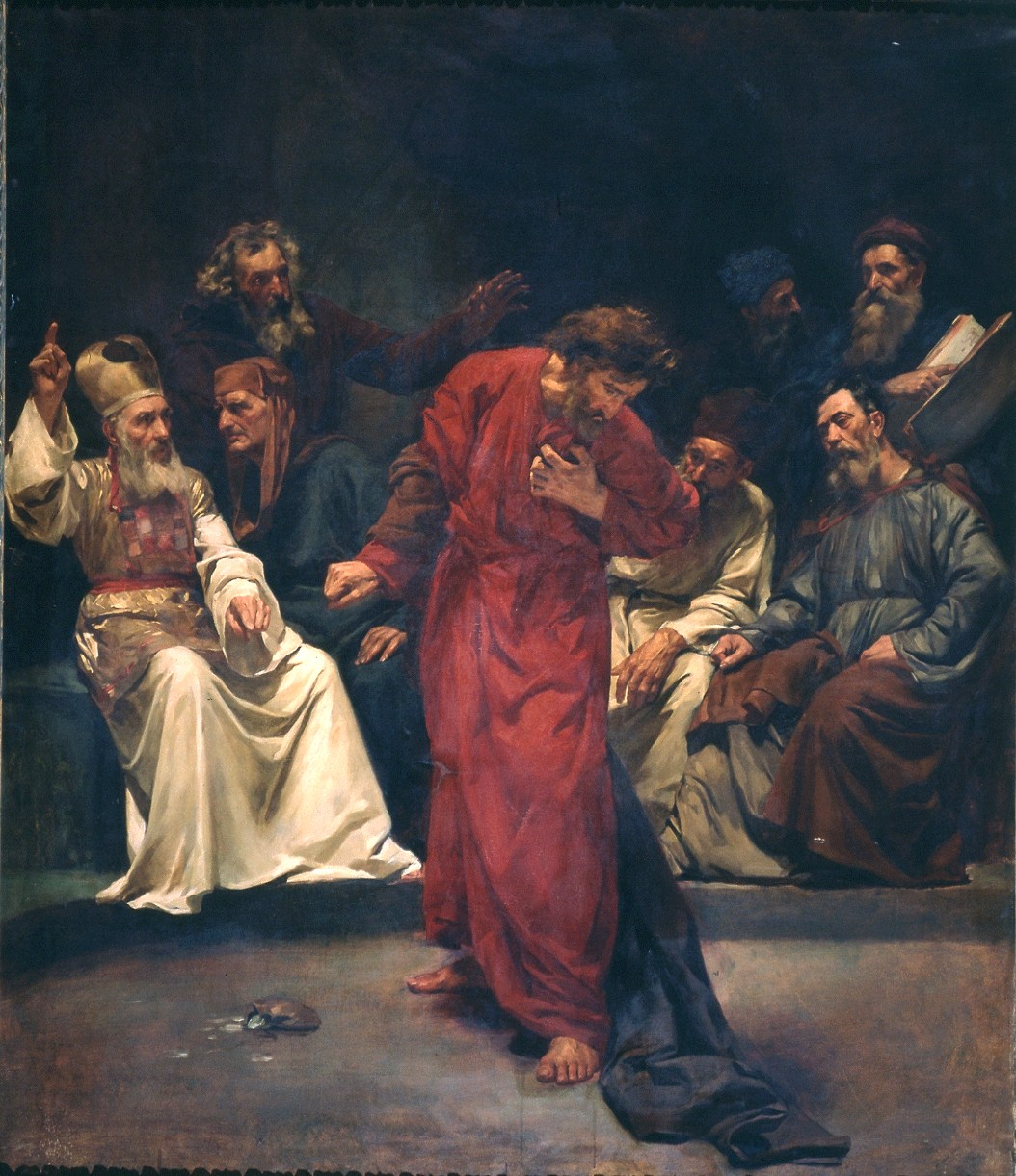
The Repentance of Judas (1874)

Simó Gómez Polo (11 November 1845 – 11 June 1880) was a Spanish painter and engraver in the Realist style.

== Biography ==
He was born in Barcelona, and studied at the Escola de la Llotja under Ramón Martí Alsina and in the lithography workshop of Eusebi Planas. At the age of seventeen, he travelled to Paris with his brother Enric, who was also an engraver, with the intention of finding employment in the workshop of the French lithographer Alfred Lemercier. However, once there, he decided to become a painter and enroll at the École des Beaux-arts. To prepare for his entrance exam, he worked in the studios of Alexandre Cabanel and Tony Robert-Fleury. Meanwhile, he went through the museums of Paris, copying the classics. During this time, he gave up the Academicism of his early years and embraced Realism. He was also heavily influenced by the works of Édouard Manet and Eugène Delacroix.

After his family's ability to provide financial assistance was exhausted, Cabanel and Fleury were sufficiently impressed with his abilities to petition Queen Isabella II (who visited Paris in 1865) to provide a stipend so Gómez could continue his studies. Unfortunately, the petition was dismissed on the grounds that too many stipends had already been given, so he and Enric had to return to Spain.

After a few years in Barcelona, they lived in Madrid for a year and a half, where Simó frequented the Museo del Prado, copying the masters. He received several commissions at that time, including a project to decorate the Palace of the Marqués de Portugalete, together with the painter José Marcelo Contreras. Upon returning home, he opened a studio in the Poble Sec district, which served as a meeting place for the local art community. Lluís Graner, Josep Cusachs and Joan Brull were among those who had their first art lessons there.

In 1874, he presented his painting Arrepentimiento de Judas (The Repentance of Judas) as part of his application for a professorship at the Escola de la Llotja, but Antoni Caba was chosen for the position instead. Gómez died in Barcelona, aged 34, from unspecified causes.
