= Fish-Fin =

"Fish-Fin" is a designation or nickname given by Mayanist epigraphers (inscription scholars) to a personage whose undeciphered name-glyph appears in the epigraphic record in association with the Emblem glyph of Bonampak, a pre-Columbian Maya civilization site in present-day Chiapas, Mexico.

This individual, identified as a ruler of the Bonampak polity or government, is mentioned in the Maya inscriptions at Yaxchilan, another Maya site located some 30 km to the north of Bonampak.

== Occurrence ==
On the inscription from a lintel in the building known as Yaxchilan Structure 12, Fish-Fin is named in association with "Knot-eye Jaguar", the ninth king in Yaxchilan's dynastic succession who reigned from about 508–518 CE. There is some dispute as to whether the context of this association places Fish-Fin as either a received visitor, or as a captive of the Yaxchilan ruler.

Fish-Fin may also be named in two looted and unprovenanced inscription panels, the Houston Panel and the Po Panel, which are suspected to have originated from Bonampak. The Houston Panel carries a Long Count date of 9.3.0.14.13 (equating to November 19, 495), and the other panel bears the long count date 9.4.8.14.9 (June 22, 523).
