= Alfred Lemercier =

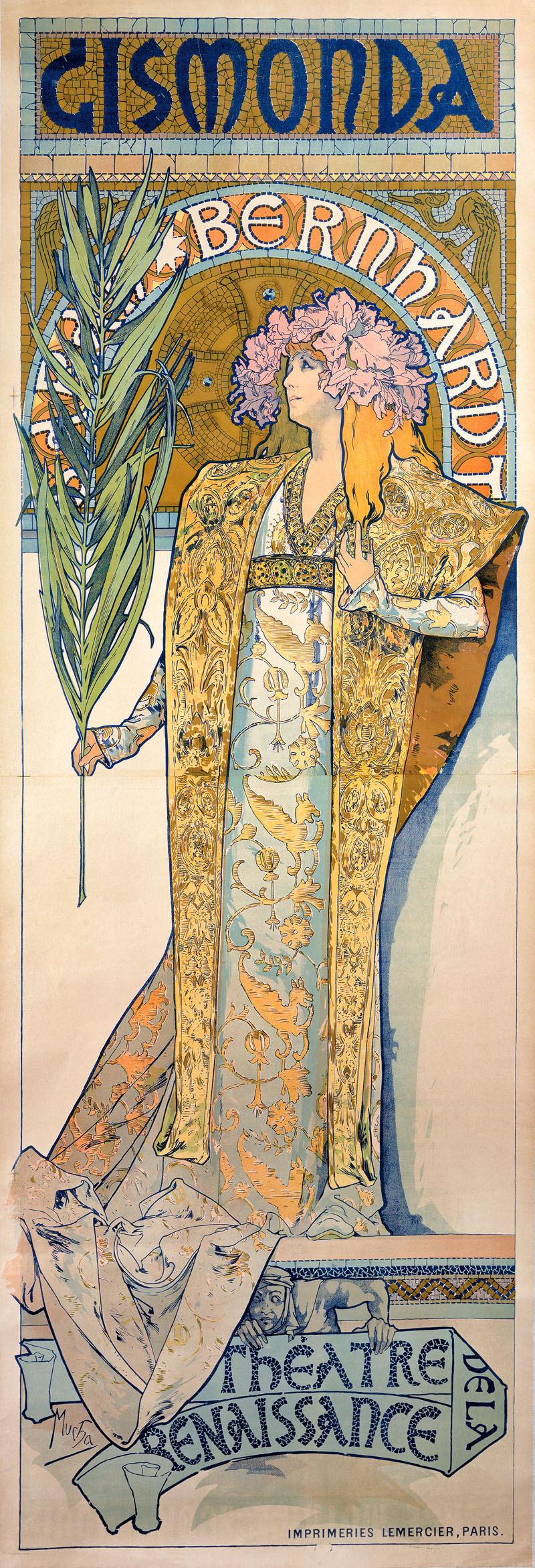
Alfons Mucha's poster for Gismonda

Alfred Léon Lemercier (29 July 1831, in Paris – 15 September 1900, in Nanterre) was a French publisher, editor and lithographer.

== Biography ==
He was born to a family of lithographers; including his father, Ambroise Lemercier (1807-1889), and his uncle, Joseph-Rose Lemercier who, in 1828, established a printing company that would become the largest in Paris. In 1852, he began an apprenticeship there, under the direction of Jacques-François Llanta. After that, he studied in the workshops of Jean Gigoux and Émile Lassalle. He had his first showing, along with other lithographers, at the Salon in 1863.

Toward the end of the 1870s, he took over management of the printing business, and brought in his son Léon as an associate. He also began employing the new process of Woodburytype.

In 1884, together with Paul Maurou, he founded the "Société des artistes lithographes français", and served as its Chairman until 1891, when they filed for bankruptcy. The following year, he had his last showing at the Salon.

He also produced posters designed by Jules Chéret, Henri Boutet, Manuel Orazi, and many others. In 1894, he printed over 4,000 posters for the play, Gismonda, designed by Alfons Mucha, and commissioned by Sarah Bernhardt, the play's director at the Théâtre de la Renaissance. Passersby tore most of them off, as souvenirs, leading to a costly lawsuit against the firm. This resulted in the loss of that contract, and several related ones, to other firms. A bankruptcy filing led to the company's closure in 1901; the year following Lemercier's death.
