= Josep Cusachs =

Spanish painter

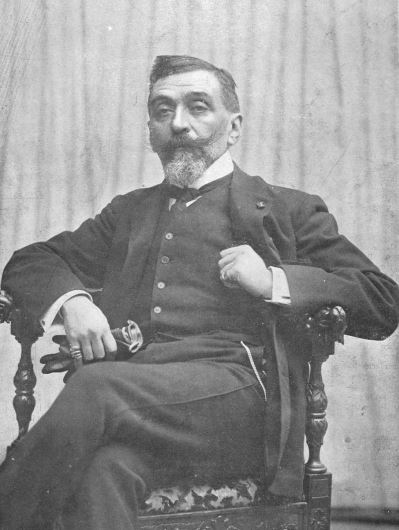
Photographed in 1908 by the Napoleon Photographic Company.

José Cusachs y Cusachs (19 July 1851, Montpellier – 1908, Barcelona) was a Spanish soldier and painter.

== Biography ==
He was born in France, while his parents were travelling, but spent most of his life in the area between Barcelona and Mataró. In 1865, he enrolled at the "Academia Militar de Artillería" in Segovia, became a Captain, and fought in the Third Carlist War. He retired with the rank of Commander in 1882 to dedicate himself to art. His army experience was still an important part of his life, however, and his paintings were mostly on military subjects, especially the cavalry, due to his love for horses. He studied locally with Simó Gómez, and in Paris with Édouard Detaille, an expert on military art.

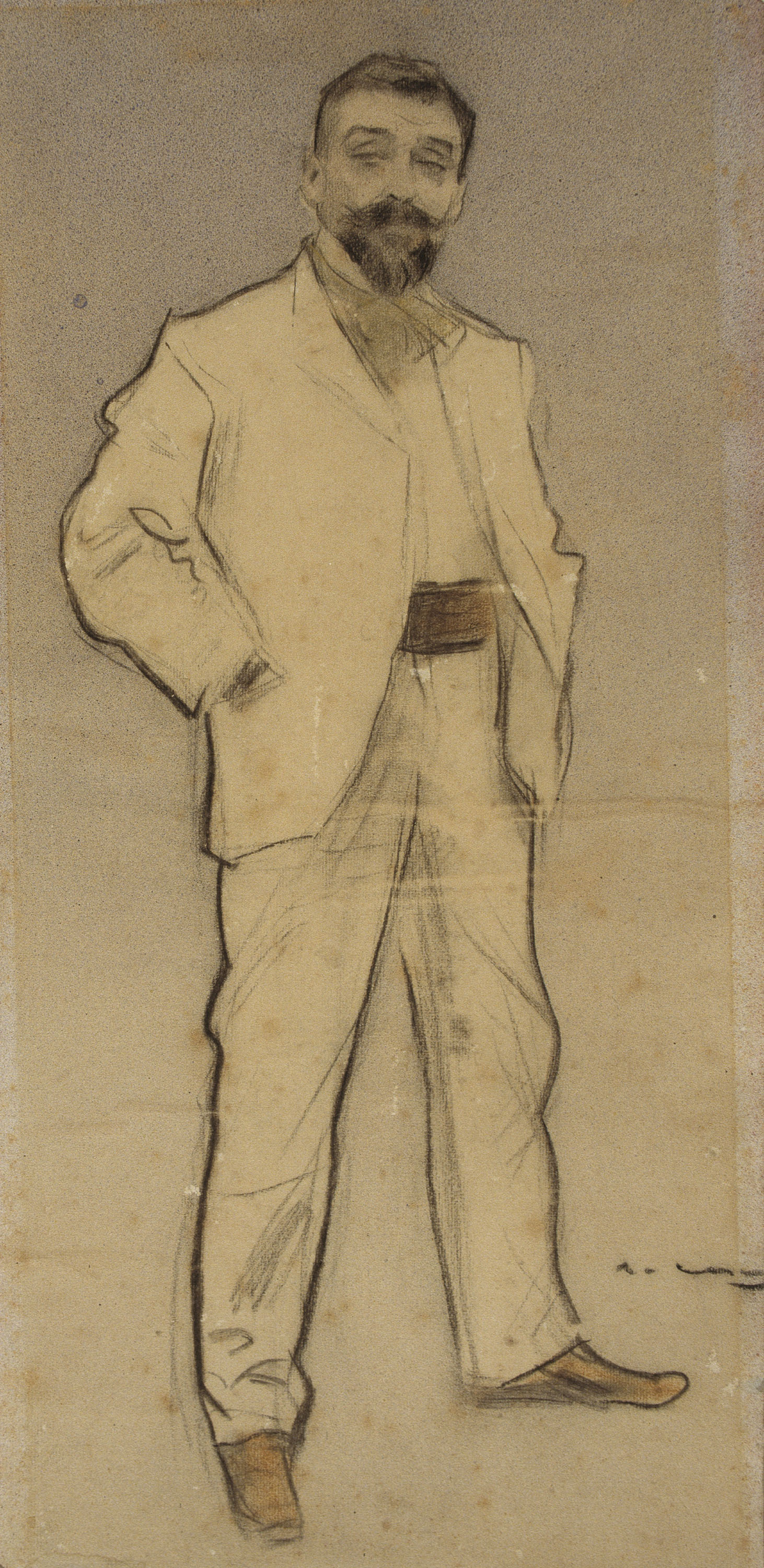
Josep Cusachs, by Ramon Casas (date unknown)

His first exhibition came in 1884 at the Sala Parés, a major art gallery in Barcelona, where he continued to exhibit regularly, with great critical and financial success. Three years later, he participated in an exposition in Madrid, where his painting En el campo de maniobras (Maneuvers in the Field), was purchased by Queen María Cristina. In 1891, he won a gold medal at the International Exposition in Berlin with Maniobras de división (Divisional Maneuvers).

In addition to his military art, he stood out as a portrait painter, with such notable sitters as King Alfonso XIII, General Juan Prim and Mexican President Porfirio Díaz, (on display at the State Art Museum of Veracruz in Orizaba). He also dealt with religious themes, including his well-known La huída a Egipto (The Flight from Egypt), which is in the Santa Maria de Montserrat Abbey.

In later years, he specialized in paintings of sport riding. The landscapes in many of his works were often entrusted to other painters, as he felt that he lacked the training to execute them properly. A good selection of his illustrations may be found in Military Life in Spain by Francesc Barado (Ramirez, 1888).

He died in 1908 (some sources say 1909) in Barcelona.

== Selected paintings ==
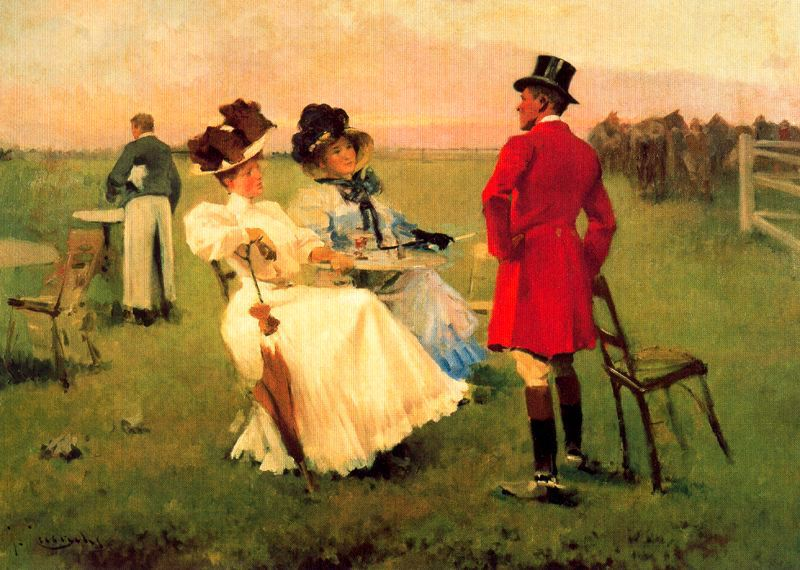
At the Racecourse

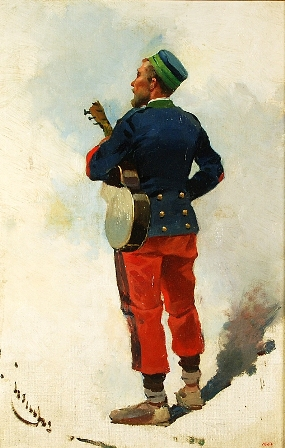
Soldier

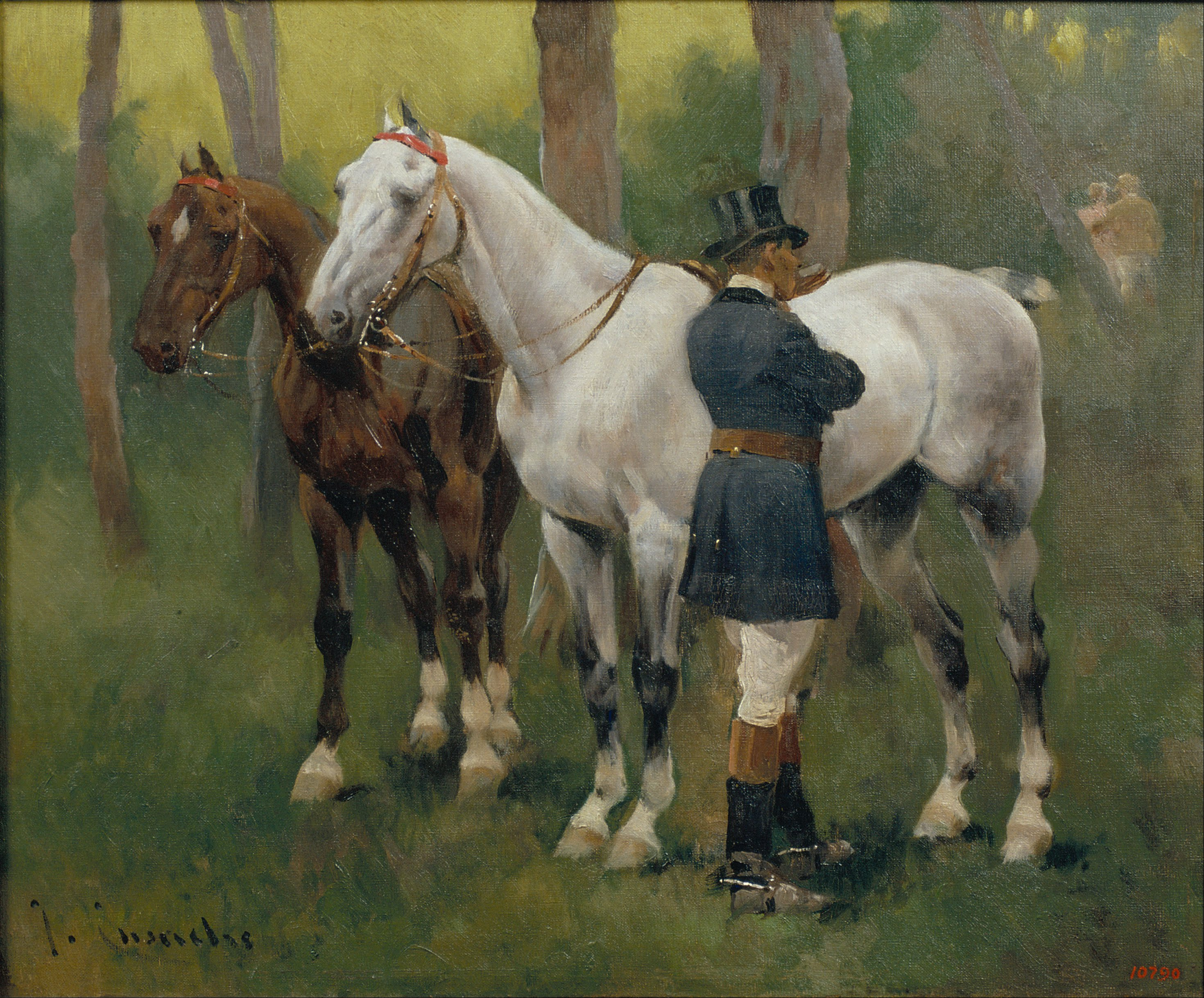
Awaiting the Return

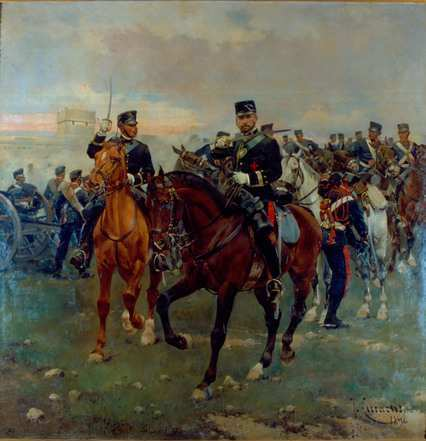
Artillery Regiment

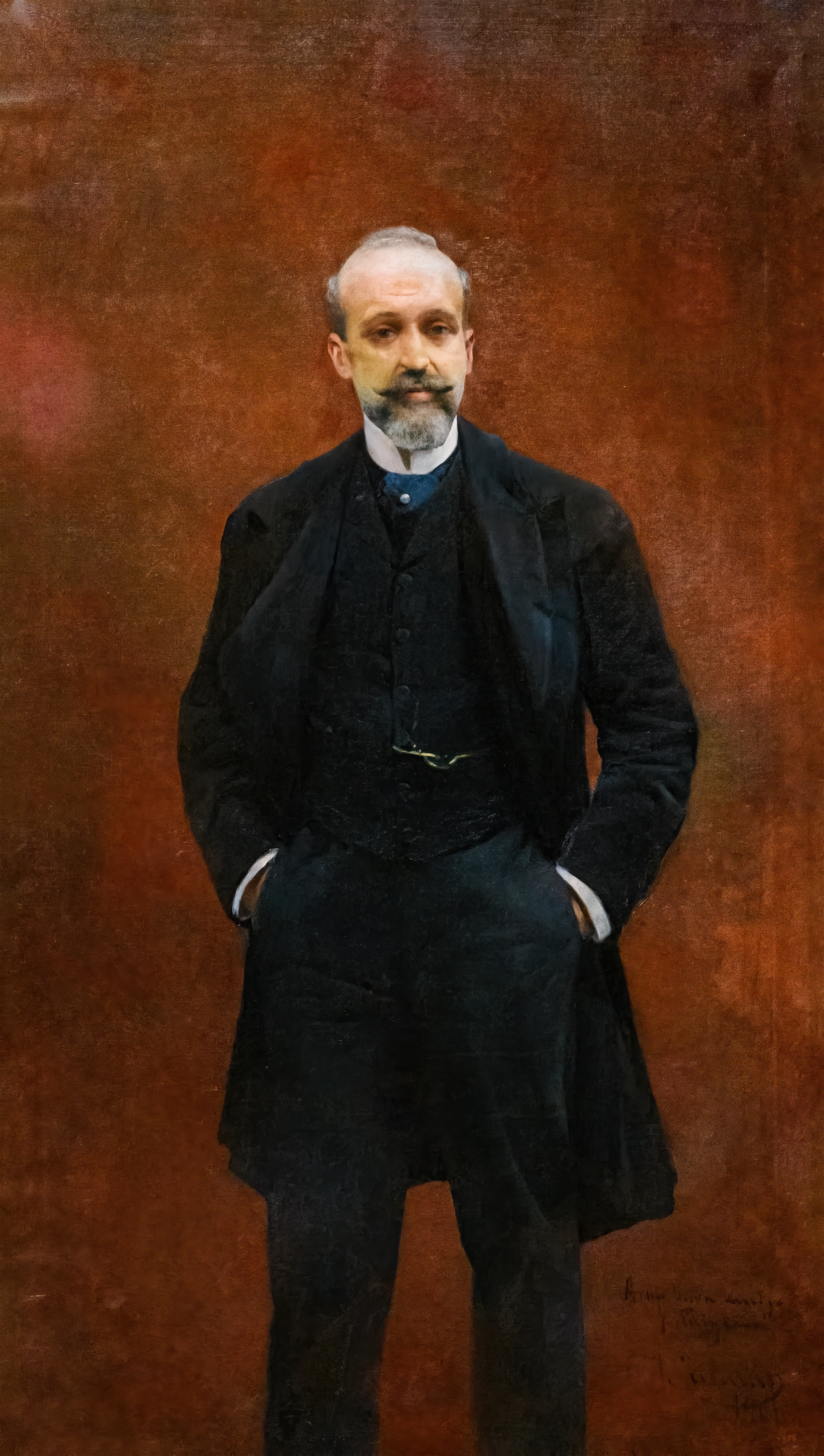
Josep Puigcarbó by Josep Cusachs
