= Women rulers in Maya society =

During the 6th and 7th centuries in Mesoamerica, there was an evident shift in the roles women played in ancient Maya society as compared with the previous two centuries. It was during this time that there was a great deal of political complexity seen both in Maya royal houses as well as in the Maya area. Warfare was a significant factor in political competition and marriage was one of the ways that alliances were made between the different polities. This was accompanied by a shift in women's roles from wife and mother to playing integral parts in courtly life, such as participating in rituals involving the supernatural world and at times ruling individual polities.

A handful of women are described and depicted on monuments taking on roles and titles that were usually reserved for men. High-ranking titles that both men and women could hold included Ajaw and Kaloomteʼ. The title of Ajaw was seen as "the most general title" that persons of nobility could have if they were born into the right social ranking; meanwhile, the title Kaloomte' has an unclear meaning but it is at the site of Tikal where the title is used as the highest rank.

Among the high-ranking women in ancient Maya society during the Classic Period were several who rose to the position of ruler. Some ruled in their own right, as monarch, due to the lack of a male heir. These women included:

- Unen Bahlam of Tikal
- Lady of Tikal
- Yohl Ikʼnal of Palenque
- Muwaan Mat of Palenque
- Ix Ch'ak Ch'een of Cobá
- Lady Yopaat of Cobá
- Lady Kʼawiil Ajaw of Cobá
- Lady Chaak of La Florida
- Lady K'awiil Yopaat of Toniná
- Lady Ich’aak K’inich of Pusilha
- Lady K'abel of the Wak kingdom

Others ruled as regent until their sons were old enough to rule. These women included:

- Lady Six Sky of Naranjo
- Lady K'awill Chan of Toniná
- B'aah Pahk of Edzná
- Lady Eveningstar of Yaxchilan

== Tikal ==
=== Unen Bahlam ===
Unen Bahlam (fl. c. 317) was a queen regnant of the Maya city-state of Tikal in circa 317. Although the sex of this ruler has been contested and is not fully confirmed, she is generally assumed to be female.

=== Lady of Tikal ===
"Lady of Tikal" assumed a leadership role at the age of six but did not rule on her own. She co-ruled with an individual named Kaloomteʼ Bahlam in 511-527. The daughter of Chak Tok Ichʼaak II, Lady of Tikal was depicted on Stela 23, which was broken and later re-erected incomplete. Her relationship to Bird Claw, who may have been her successor is unknown due to problems deciphering the text of Stela 8, but Bird Claw does not carry the Tikal emblem.

Monuments that refer to the Lady of Tikal are: Stelae 6, 12, and 23.

== Palenque ==
=== Lady Yohl Ikʼnal ===
Lady Yohl Ikʼnal took the throne at Palenque in 583 when Kan Bahlam I, the 7th ruler, died and left no heir. The relationship between her and the previous king remains undetermined, though she appears to have been either his daughter or sister. She ruled for more than 20 years. She also carried full royal titles, an uncommon occurrence for women. According to the sarcophagus of Kʼinich Janaabʼ Pakal, Yohl Ikʼnal was the mother of Lady Sak Kʼukʼ, making Lady Yohl Ikʼnal the grandmother of Kʼinich Janaab Pakal.

Lady Yohl Ikʼnal appears on the side of the sarcophagus of Kʼinich Janaab Pakal.

=== Muwaan Mat ===
Muwaan Mat (also known as Lady Sak Kʼukʼ or "Lady Beastie") ruled for a short time after the death of Aj Neʼ Yohl Mat in 612 before Kʼinich Janaabʼ Pakal took the throne in 615.

It was probably Sak Kʼukʼ and her consort Kʼan Moʼ Hix who held most of the power during the childhood of Kʼinich Janaabʼ Pakal. There is an image of Lady Sak K'uk handing him what had been termed the "drum major" crown at his accession.

== Naranjo ==
=== Lady Six Sky ===
Lady Six Sky
- Reign: 682 – 741
- Predecessor: Kʼahk Skull Chan Chaak
- Successor: Kʼahk Tiliw Chan Chaak
- Born: Dos Pilas?
- Died: February 10 or 11, 741
Names
- Lady Six Sky, also known as Lady Wac Chanil Ahau, Lady of Dos Pilas, Lady of Tikal
- Father: Bajlaj Chan Kʼawiil of Dos Pilas
- Mother: Lady Buluʼ

Of the female monarchs, Lady Six Sky's reign was the most impressive. She was the daughter of Bajlaj Chan Kʼawiil of Dos Pilas and arrived at Naranjo in the position of ruling queen and established a "new dynasty." Lady Six Sky commissioned monuments that note she performed important calendric rituals, some shortly after her arrival. Additionally, she is shown on monuments taking on the role of a warrior-king by standing over a trampled captive, an unusual representation for a woman. Naranjo Stela 24 is one such depiction. Scholars suspect that Kʼahkʼ Tiliw Chan Chaak, the king who succeeded her, was the son of Lady Six Sky. He was born five years after her arrival at Naranjo.

Monuments that refer to Lady Six Sky are: Stelae 3, 18, 24, 29, and 31. She died on February 10 or 11, 741.

== Yaxchilan ==
=== Lady Ikʼ Skull ===
Lady of Ikʼ Skull
- 'Ix Ajaw'
- Reign: as possible regent
- Predecessor: Itzamnaaj Bahlam III
- Successor: Bird Jaguar IV
- Born: September 1, 704; Calakmul
- Died: 751
- Spouse: Itzamnaaj Bahlam III
Names
- Lady of Ikʼ Skull, AKA Lady Eveningstar

Lady Ikʼ Skull, also known as Lady Eveningstar, came to Yaxchilan from Calakmul. She was a secondary wife to Itzamnaaj Bahlam III (also referred to as Shield Jaguar II, Shield Jaguar the Great or Itzamnaaj Bʼalam II). Although a secondary wife, Lady Ikʼ Skull may have ruled for a short time in Yaxchilan's history until her son Bird Jaguar IV was old enough to take the throne. A review of the dynastic history of Yaxchilan during Itzamnaaj Bahlam III's reign indicates that he had three wives: Lady Kʼabʼal Xook (also written as Lady Xoc or Lady Xok), Lady Sak Bʼiyaan and Lady Ikʼ Skull of Calakmul, with Lady Kʼabʼal Xook as the primary wife. Upon the death of Itzamnaaj Bahlam, the right to the throne would traditionally have gone to his heir through the Lady Kʼabʼal Xook; however, this was not what happened, and nearly ten years after his death, his son Bird Jaguar IV by Lady Ikʼ Skull took the throne.

There is a great deal of speculation as to why the son of a secondary wife took the throne and did so after the king had been dead for ten years. Current thinking is that the rightful heir through Lady Kʼabʼal Xook's lineage may have been her son, or perhaps a nephew or brother, but that this individual was captured during a conflict with Dos Pilas in 745. Information regarding this "interregnum" period tends to be conflicting. In their second revised edition Martin and Grube note that at Piedras Negras there is mention of a new king at Yaxchilan, Yopaat Bahlam II, who may have ruled for part or all of this period. However, supporting evidence for this is unknown from Yaxchilan. On the other hand, Josserand notes that Lady Ikʼ Skull ruled as regent during this time and that it was not until her death that Bird Jaguar IV took the throne.

A monument which refers to Lady Ikʼ Skull is stela 35.

== See also ==
- Gender in Mesoamerican cultures

== Notes ==
Information regarding monuments in which the above individuals are noted was obtained from Martin and Grube 2008: 38, 74, 129, 160, and 161.
