= Lady Pacal =

Lady Pakal
- Ajaw

Queen consort of Yaxchilán
- Tenure: ?-681
- Successor: Lady K'ab'al Xook (sister)
- Born: 607; Yaxchilán
- Died: 705 (aged 97–98); Yaxchilán
- Spouse: Yaxun Bahlam III
- Issue: Itzamnaaj Bahlam III
- Mother: Lady Xibalba
- Religion: Maya religion

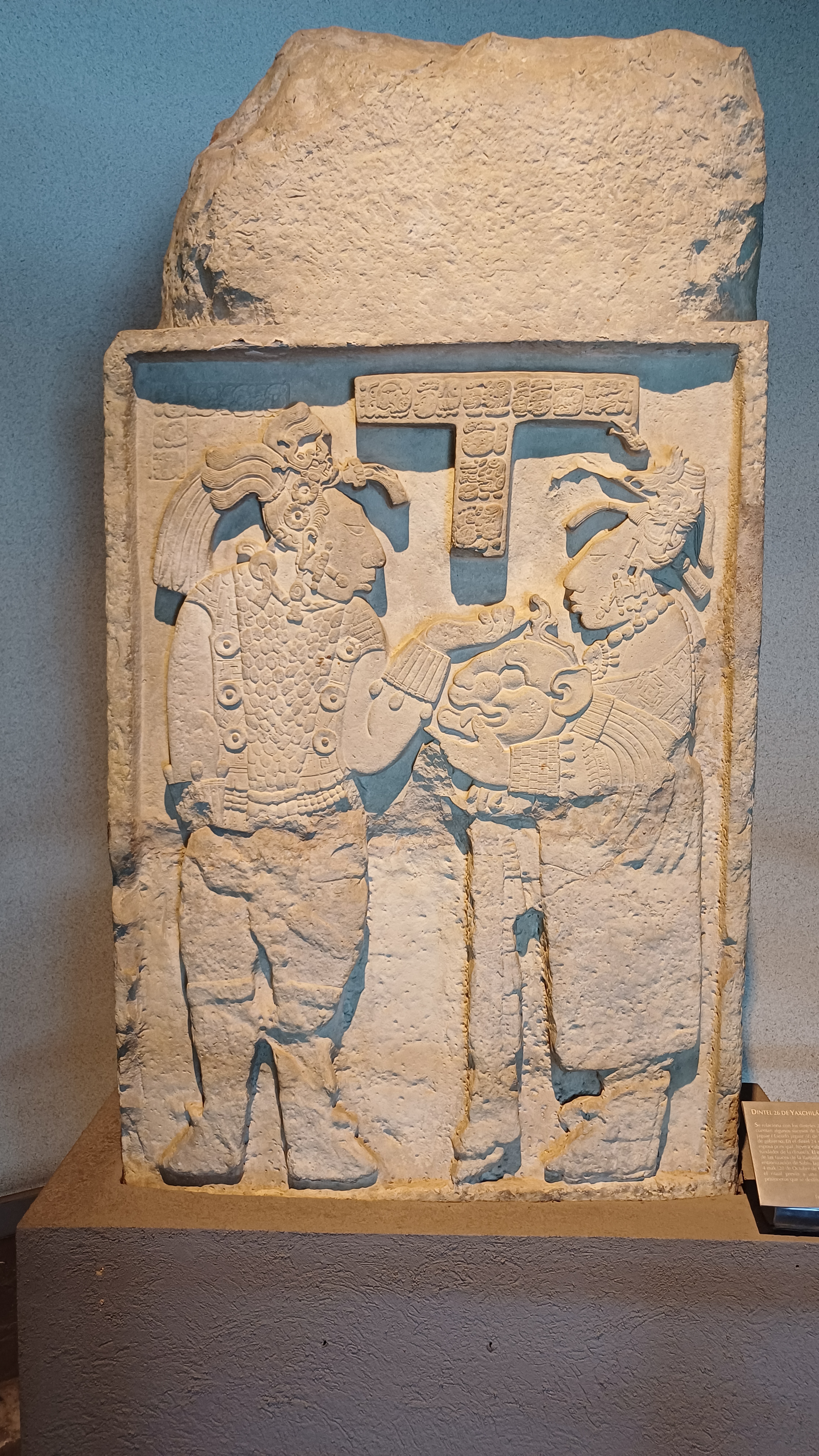
Son of Lady Pacal, king Itzamnaaj B'alam II and her sister, Lady Xoc

Lady Pakal (or Lady Pacal; Mayan Ix Pacal) was a Maya Queen consort of Yaxchilan in Mexico.

It is said that she lived into her sixth k'atun, meaning that she was at least ninety-eight when she died in 705.

Her name means "shield".

== Family ==
Lady Pacal was a daughter of Lady Xibalba and wife of the king (ajaw) Yaxun B'alam III and mother of Itzamnaaj B'alam II.

Her grandson was Yaxun B'alam IV (752–768).

Her possible sister was Lady Xoc and her daughter-in-law was Lady Eveningstar of Calakmul.

== See also ==
- Yaxchilan rulers
