= Yaxun Bʼalam III =

Yaxun Bahlam III
- High King of Yaxchilan, Ajaw
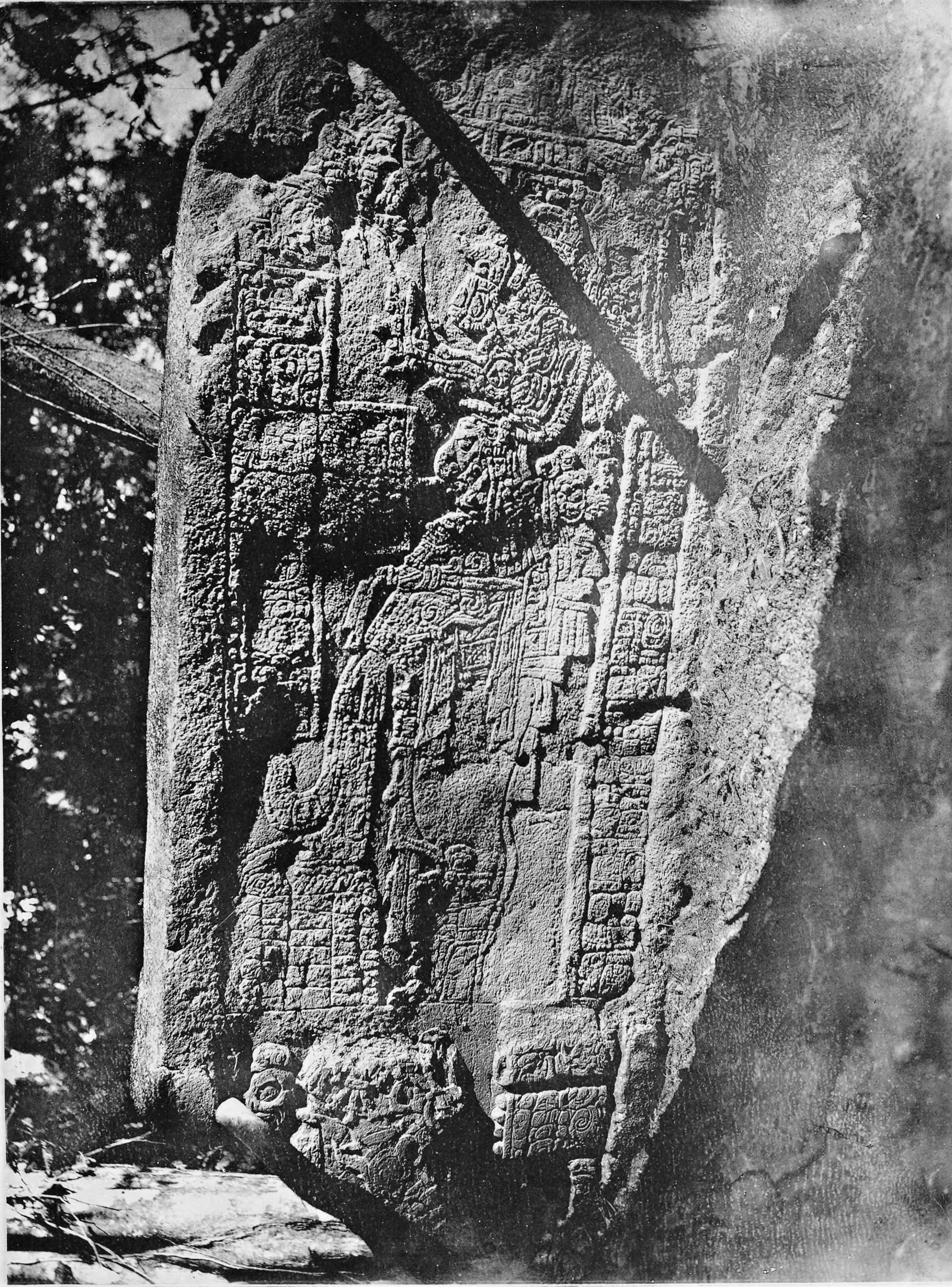
- Yaxun Bahlam III's portrait on Stela 6

King of Yaxchilán
- Reign: 631 – 681
- Predecessor: K'inich Tat'bu Jol III
- Successor: Itzamnaaj Bahlam III
- Born: Yaxchilán
- Died: 681; Yaxchilán
- Spouse: Lady Pacal
- Issue: Itzamnaaj Bahlam III
- Father: Kʼinich Tatbu Skull III
- Religion: Maya religion

Yaxun Bʼalam III (also known as 6-Tun-Bird-Jaguar) was a high king of the Mayan city Yaxchilan from 631 until 681.

== Family and Name ==
Yaxun Bʼalam's father was Kʼinich Tatbu Skull III. The name of his mother is unknown.

Yaxun married Lady Pacal (sister of Lady Xoc), and their son, Itzamnaaj Bʼalam III, succeeded him as king.

It is generally believed that Bʼalam is the third Yaxun Bʼalam; "6-Tun" was later added to the glyph of his name, distinguishing him from his grandson, Yaxun Bʼalam IV (also known as Bird Jaguar IV).

== Reign ==
Bʼalam ruled Yaxchilan from 631 to 681.

On the stairs of Temple 33, he is depicted as being on the eighth step playing ball on the date August 27, 636.

In either 646 or 647, Bʼalam captured a lord from the Hix Witz polity, a Maya center. He noted the capital of the Hix Witz polity was located at Zapote Bobal during that time.

== Bibliography ==
- Schele, Linda; David Freidel (1992). A Forest of Kings: The Untold Story of the Ancient Maya (pbk reprint ed.). New York: Harper Perennial. ISBN 0-688-11204-8. OCLC 145324300.

Preceded by Ah Kan-Xoc?	High King of Yaxchilan; 631 – 681	Succeeded by Itzamnaaj Bʼalam II
