= Désiré Charnay =

French archaeologist and explorer (1828–1915)

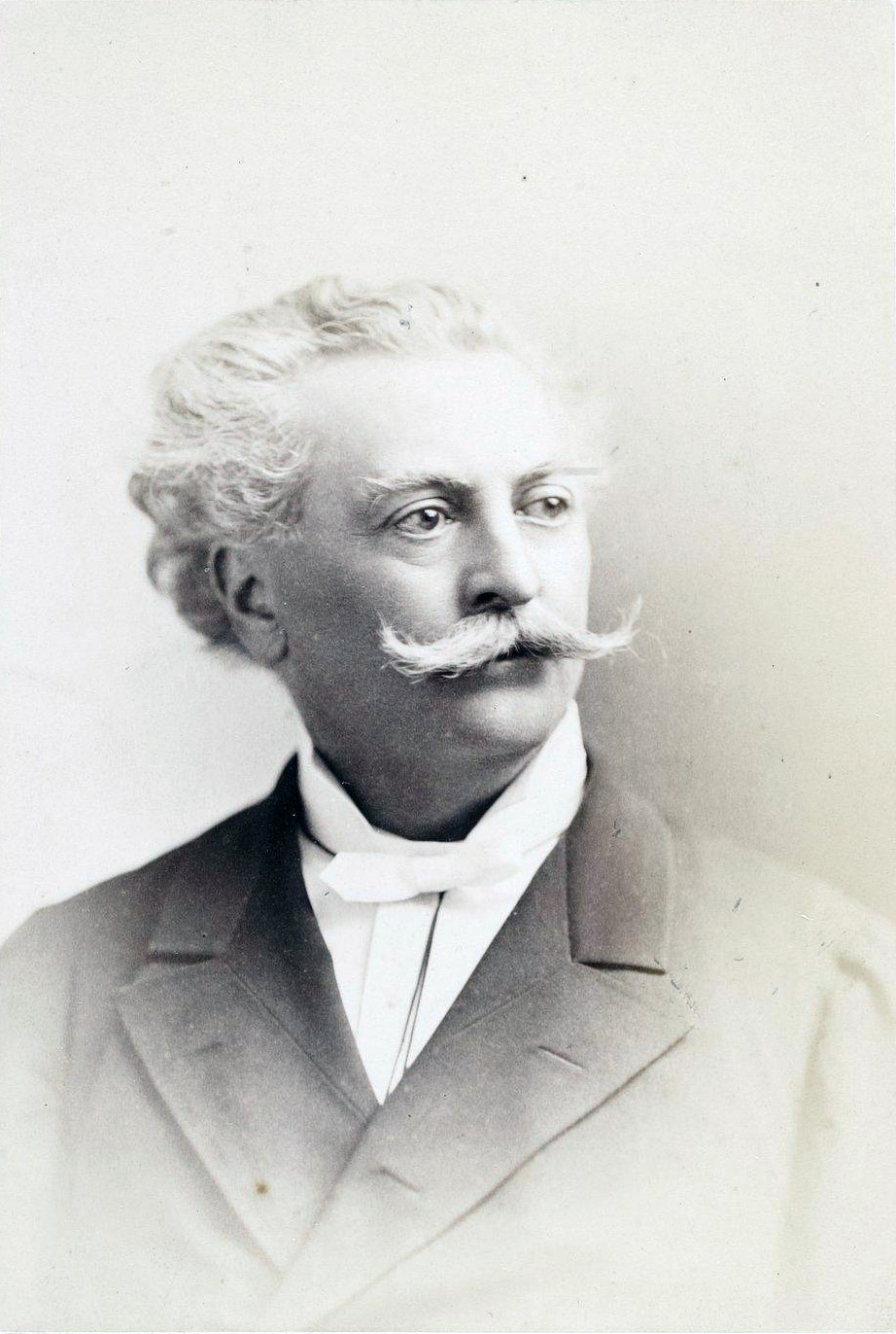
- Charnay in 1878
- Born: 2 May 1828; Fleurie, France
- Died: 24 October 1915 (aged 87); Paris, France
- Scientific career
- Fields: Archaeology

Claude-Joseph Désiré Charnay (2 May 1828 – 24 October 1915) was a French traveller and archaeologist notable both for his explorations of Mexico and Central America, and for the pioneering use of photography to document his discoveries.

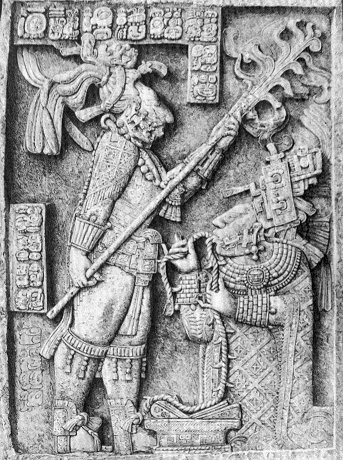
Lintel 24, Structure 23, Yaxchilan, as drawn by Désiré Charnay. The sculpture depicts a sacred bloodletting ritual which occurred 28 October 709. Yaxchilan ruler Shield Jaguar is shown holding a torch, while his wife Lady Xoc draws a rope through her pierced tongue. (109.7 x 77.3 cm)

== Biography ==
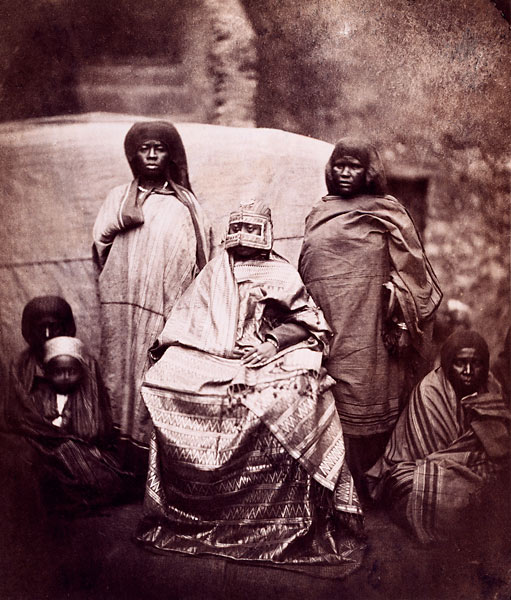
Queen Jumbe-Souli of Moheli

Désiré Charnay was born in Fleurie, and studied at the Lycée Charlemagne. In 1850, he became a teacher in New Orleans, Louisiana, a partly French-speaking community, and there became acquainted with John Lloyd Stephens's books of travel in Yucatan. He travelled in Mexico, by commission from the French ministry of education, during 1857–1861. In Madagascar during 1863, he visited many parts of the island and also spent time in the Comoros. He was present there in 1863 when the French government made a deputation to Queen Jumbe-Souli and photographed the event.

He returned to Mexico in 1864, with the French troops of Emperor Maximilian, in South America, particularly Chile and Argentina, in 1875; and in Java and Australia during 1878. During 1880–1883, he again visited the ruined cities of Mexico. Pierre Lorillard IV of New York City contributed to defray the expense of this expedition, and Charnay named a great ruined city near the Guatemalan boundary line "Ville Lorillard" in his honor; the name did not become popular and the site is more commonly known as Yaxchilan. Charnay went to Yucatan in 1886.

Charnay was aware of new legislation in Mexico that attempted to protect its archeological sites and treasures, and obtained a license from the government in July 1880. By its terms, he could explore widely and remove artifacts but they had to be sent to the National Museum first. The museum could keep the majority, but the rest could be sent to France. Despite the contract, members of the Mexican Congress objected, and there were impassioned speeches by Vicente Riva Palacio, liberal general who had fought the French, and liberal intellectual Guillermo Prieto. Justo Sierra, later a major official during the regime of Porfirio Díaz, was in favor of the contract. In the end the Charnay contract was rejected 114–6. He had, however, already violated the terms of the contract, hiding smaller artifacts from Mexican officials and only submitting to inspection those that were too big to hide.

The more important of his publications are Le Mexique, souvenirs et impressions de voyage (1863), being his personal report on the expedition of 1857–1861, of which the official report is to be found in Viollet-le-Duc's Cités et ruines américaines: Mitla, Palenqué, Izamal, Chichén-Itzá, Uxmal (1863), vol. 19 of Recueil des voyages et des documents; Les Anciennes villes du Nouveau Monde (1885; English translation, The Ancient Cities of the New World, 1887, by Mmes. Gonino and Conant); a romance, Une Princesse indienne avant la conquête (1888); À travers les forêts vierges (1890); and Manuscrit Ramirez: Histoire de l'origine des Indiens qui habitent la Nouvelle Espagne selon leurs traditions (1903).

He translated Hernán Cortés's letters into French, with the title Lettres de Fernand Cortès à Charles Quint sur la découverte et la conquête du Mexique (1896). He elaborated a theory of Toltec migrations and considered the prehistoric Mexican to be of Asiatic origin, because of supposed observed similarities to Japanese architecture, Chinese decoration, Malaysian language and Cambodian dress, and so on.
