= Ah Ahaual =

7th-century captive recorded in Maya inscriptions

Ah-Ahaual was a 7th-century captive of noble lineage recorded in pre-Columbian Maya inscriptions. The particular Maya civilization polity or city-state he came from is unidentified. According to inscriptions at the Maya site of Yaxchilan, Ah-Ahaual was captured by the Yaxchilan's ruler known as Shield Jaguar in the year 680. Shield Jaguar was asked by the lords of Yaxchilan to take an important official captive before he could become ruler and chose to take Ah-Ahaual. Ah-Ahaual was most likely killed in the same year at Yaxchilan. He is mentioned on Lintel 24 found on Structure 23 in Yaxchilan.
