= Itzamnaaj Bahlam III =

- Ajaw
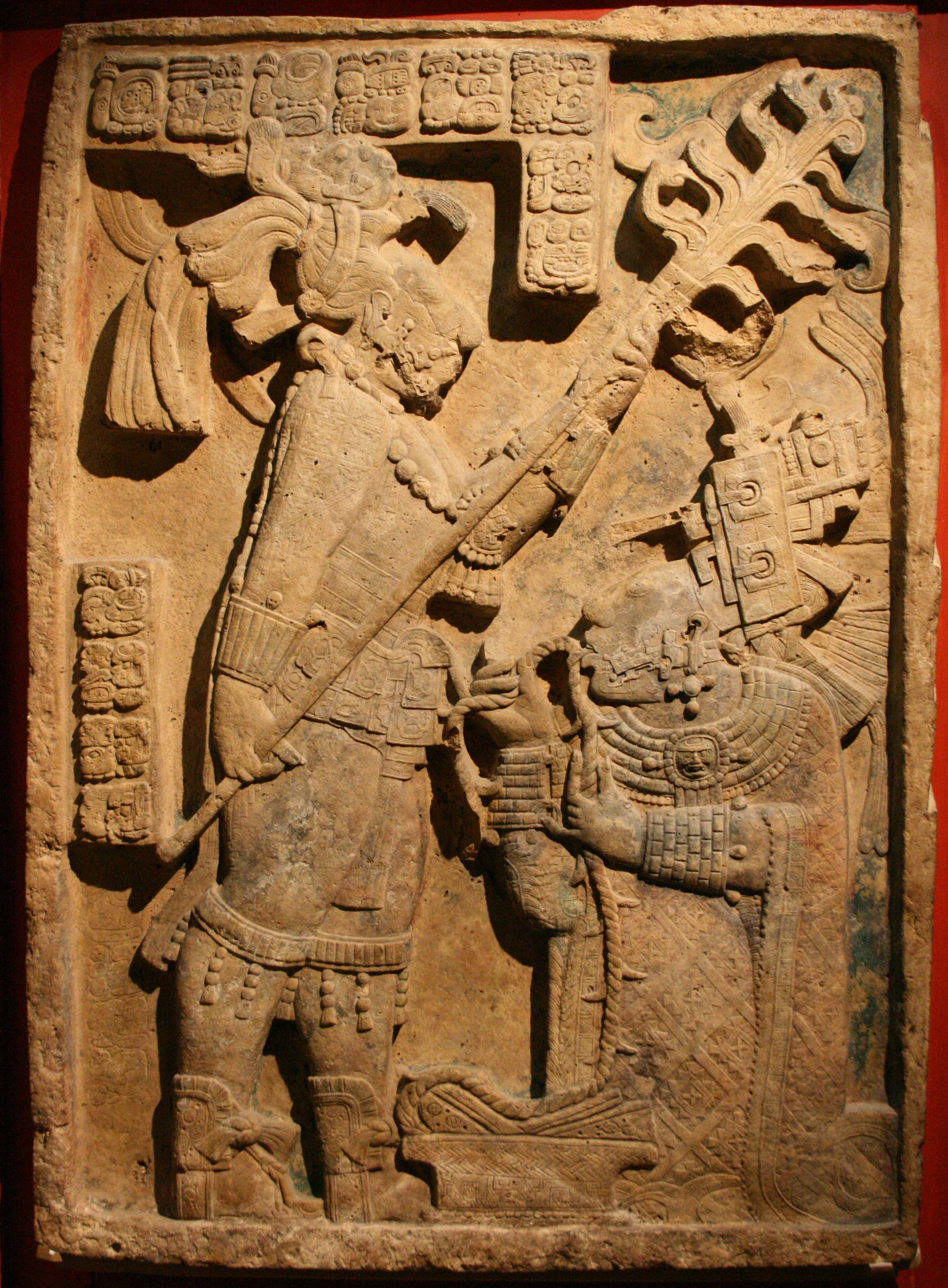
- Itzamnaaj Bahlam III (standing left) on Lintel 24 with his aunt-wife, Lady Xoc

King of Yaxchilan
- Reign: 23 October 681–15 June 742
- Predecessor: Yaxun Bʼalam III
- Successor: Yaxun Bʼalam IV
- Born: 647
- Died: 15 June 742 (aged 94–95)
- Consort: Lady Xoc (aunt); Lady Eveningstar of Calakmul; Lady Sak Bʼiyaan
- Issue: Yaxun Bʼalam IV
- Father: Yaxun Bʼalam III
- Mother: Lady Pacal
- Religion: Maya religion

Itzamnaaj Bahlam III (also styled Itzamnaaj B'alam, Shield Jaguar) (647 - June 15, 742) was a Mayan king of the city of Yaxchilan which is now located in Chiapas, Mexico. He rose to power in October 681 and continued to rule until his death in June 742. Itzamnaaj Bahlam III is best known for the many buildings and stelae he commissioned during his rule, many of which are still found at Yaxchilan today. He was spouse to Lady Ik' Skull who herself ruled for a time.

== Family ==
Itzamnaaj Bʼalam was born in 647 to Lady Pacal and Yaxun Bʼalam III and later had a son named Yaxun Bʼalam IV who ascended to the throne after Itzamnaaj Bʼalam's death.

His grandmother was Lady Xibalba, noblewoman of Yaxchilan.

== Early life ==
Little is known of Itzamnaaj Bʼalam's early life except that when he was eleven years old one of his siblings participated in a war that involved Pacal, the famous king of Palenque.

== Accession and reign ==
Shortly before he became king, Itzamnaaj Bahlam defeated Ah Ahaual (a Mayan noble) in war and took him captive to Yaxchilan. At the age of around 34 on October 23, 681, he became king of Yaxchilan. He was married to his aunt, Lady Xoc, and she held a great amount of power.

One of Itzamnaaj Bahlam's greatest accomplishments was the construction of what is now called Temple 23. At Temple 23, Lady Xook is shown performing a bloodletting ritual for three occasions: Itzamnaaj Bahlam's accession to the throne, the birth of Yaxun Bahlam, and the dedication of Temple 23.

== Preparing for an heir ==
Itzamnaaj Bʼalam had a second wife named Lady Eveningstar of Calakmul with whom he had a son named Yaxun Bʼalam. He chose Yaxun Bʼalam to be his successor despite the fact that Lady Xoc, his other wife, had a strategically important bloodline.

It is believed by Linda Schele and David Freidel that Itzamnaaj Bʼalam had Temple 23 in Yaxchilan constructed to honor Lady Xoc while also gaining public support for his son to become king.

He also married Lady Sak Bʼiyaan, but she was not of so high status as his aunt.

== End of the reign ==
The majority of the buildings constructed during Itzamnaaj Bʼalam's reign occurred in the last third of his life. He was still leading his troops to battle in his eighties.

Itzamnaaj Bʼalam died at the age of around 95.

== Bibliography ==
- Martin, Simon; Nikolai Grube (2008). Chronicle of the Maya Kings and Queens: Deciphering the Dynasties of the Ancient Maya (2nd, revised ed.). London and New York: Thames & Hudson. ISBN 978-0-500-28726-2. OCLC 191753193.
- Schele, Linda; David Freidel (1992). A Forest of Kings: The Untold Story of the Ancient Maya (pbk reprint ed.). New York: Harper Perennial. ISBN 0-688-11204-8. OCLC 145324300.
- Sharer, Robert J.; Loa P. Traxler (2006). The Ancient Maya (6th, fully revised ed.). Stanford, CA: Stanford University Press. ISBN 0-8047-4816-0. OCLC 28067148.

| Preceded by Yaxun Bʼalam III | High Kings of Yaxchilan; 681–742 | Succeeded by Yaxun Bʼalam IV |
