= El Chicozapote =

Maya site in Chiapas, Mexico

Coordinates: 16°57′N 91°06′W

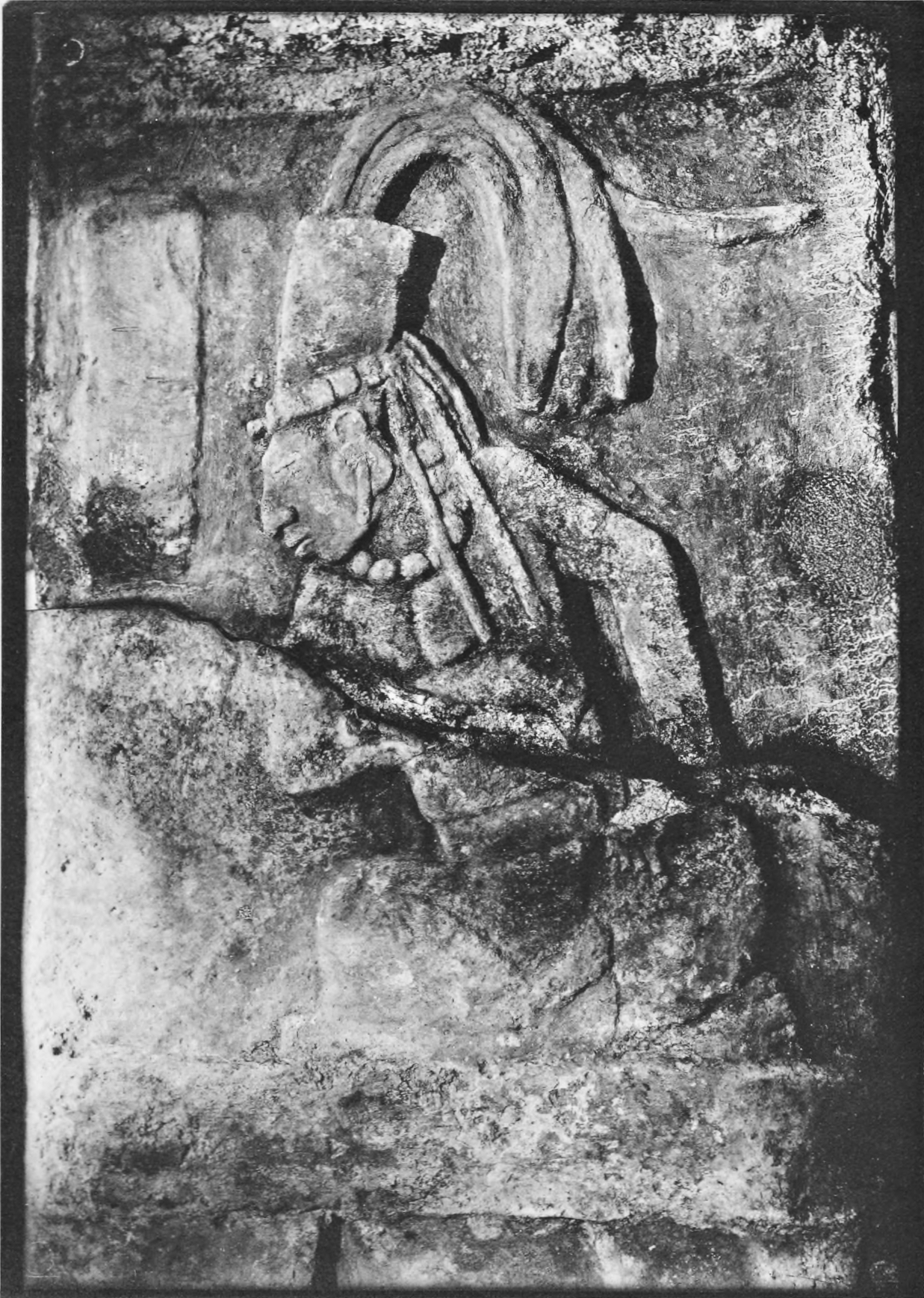
- El Chicozapote lintel 4
- Interactive map of El Chicozapote
- Type: Ancient Maya site
- Periods: Classic
- Cultures: Maya civilization
- Location: Mexico
- Region: Usumacinta

Site notes
- Architectural style: Usumacinta

El Chicozapote is a Pre-Columbian archaeological Maya site in the Usumacinta River Basin region of the Mexican state of Chiapas. The site dates from the Classic period of the Maya civilization and it developed as a vassal state subordinated to the kingdom of Yaxchilan. The site discoveries include a group of carved lintels conserving remains of the original paint.

== History ==
El Chicozapote developed during the middle and late classic period of Mesoamerica in the Usumacinta Basin. It was under the domain of Yaxchilan. Numerous defensive walls have been found along the site, this type of structures have been commonly identified in other vassal sites of Yaxchilan, the function was to contain and resist the attacks of Piedras Negras during the constant war conflicts with Yaxchilan to dominate the Usumacinta region, showing that the site faced constant attacks and wars.

Inside the Temple of the Four Lintels, a group of carved and painted monuments was discovered depicting high-ranking individuals dressed as priests performing ceremonies. The lintels have preserved the original paint used at the time of their creation, between 600 and 850. Visible colours have been identified, including white, red, green, and blue. El Chicozapote lintel 1 has a carved image of a ruler, a vassal of the king of Yaxchilan Yaxun Bʼalam IV, with the title sajal (a title given to a ruler subordinate to a larger capital), sitting on a mythological concept known as Witz (mountain) with the figure of a skull.

El Chicozapote was discovered in June 1897 by archaeologist Teobert Maler during an archaeological expedition on the Usumacinta River, where Maler also documented the existence of nearby sites such as El Chile and Anaité. At the site, he described and photographed the main structures, including the temples and lintels. The site remained unexplored until 1960, when an intense archaeological looting affected several forgotten and abandoned Maya sites along both sides of the Usumacinta. At an unknown date, the lintels were removed from their original site; decades later, they were found on display in various museums and private collections.
