= Vision Serpent =

Creature in Pre-Columbian Maya mythology

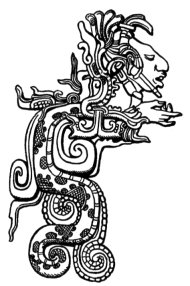
A Vision Serpent, detail of Lintel 15 at the Classical Maya site of Yaxchilan

The Vision Serpent is an important creature in Pre-Columbian Maya mythology, although the term itself is now slowly becoming outdated.

The serpent was a very important social and religious symbol, revered by the Maya. Maya mythology describes serpents as being the vehicles by which celestial bodies, such as the sun and stars, cross the heavens. The shedding of their skin made them a symbol of rebirth and renewal.

They were so revered, that one of the main Mesoamerican deities, Quetzalcoatl, was represented as a feathered serpent. The name means "Precious/feathered serpent" (from Nahuatl, "quetzalli" is used to describe the bird, its feathers, or something precious depending on the context and "coatl" meaning snake or serpent.).

The Vision Serpent is thought to be the most important of the Maya serpents. "It was usually bearded and had a rounded snout. It was also often depicted as having two heads or with the spirit of a god or ancestor emerging from its jaws." During Maya bloodletting rituals, participants would experience visions in which they communicated with the ancestors or gods. These visions took the form of a giant serpent which served as a gateway to the spirit realm. The ancestor or god who was being contacted was depicted as emerging from the serpent's mouth. The vision serpent thus came to be the method in which ancestors or gods manifested themselves to the Maya. Thus for them, the Vision Serpent was a direct link between the spirit realm of the gods and the physical world.

The Vision Serpent goes back to earlier Maya conceptions and lies at the center of the world as they conceived it. "It is in the center axis atop the World Tree. Essentially the World Tree and the Vision Serpent, representing the king, created the center axis which communicates between the spiritual and the earthly worlds or planes. It is through ritual that the king could bring the center axis into existence in the temples and create a doorway to the spiritual world, and with it power."

The Vision Serpent is prevalent in bloodletting ceremonies, in Maya religious practices, Maya jewelry, pottery and their architecture.

== Bloodletting rituals ==
Many have attempted to explain the manifestation of the Vision Serpent in association with Maya bloodletting. One conclusion is "that massive blood loss causes the brain to release an abundance of natural endorphins, which are chemically related to opiates. As the body goes into shock, a hallucinatory vision occurs." Once the actual bloodletting was over, the blood soaked ceremonial papers were burned, releasing a column of smoke. The smoke provided the perfect medium for the Vision Serpent to appear. Every major political or religious event involved bloodletting because it provided a medium by which the gods could be called upon to witness and actually participate in the ceremony. Sometimes the spirits of ancestors were also called upon to give guidance. The Hauberg Stela (A. D. 199) from the Maya Lowlands "is one of the first dated monuments that depict the Vision Serpent's connection to bloodletting".

Lintel 25 depicts one of the bloodletting rituals. "One of Shield Jaguar's wives, is seen gazing up towards an enormous bicephalous Vision Serpent. In her left hand, she holds a bowl containing a stingray spine, an obsidian lancet, and papers spattered with blood. The Vision Serpent appears to be emanating from the bowl. From the jaws of the Vision Serpent, spews forth an ancestral Tlaloc warrior complete with spear and shield".

Lintel 17 refers to "Bird Jaguars as Blood Lord of Yaxchilan" and shows him preparing to draw blood from his penis with a stingray spine. Opposite Bird Jaguar is Lady Balam-Ix, who proceeds to pass coarse rope through a gouge in her tongue. The blood is being collected in the vessel near Bird Jaguar's feet. The Vision Serpent's mouth is green and, the trickles of blood characteristic of bloodletting are red".

Lintel 15 depicts the appearance of this Vision Serpent. "The serpent can be seen rising out of the bowl with trickles of blood along a column of blood scrolls. This lintel shows the queen of Yaxchilan involved in a visionary experience following an elaborate bloodletting ceremony. She holds the ritual paraphernalia in her arms while the vision serpent rises from a bowl of blood stained paper."

== Maya religious rites ==
There was a Vision Serpent named Och-Kan, lord of Kalak'mul.

One of the most common rituals associated with the Vision serpent involved invoking ancestral spirits. Especially during coronation rites, the kings would contact the spirits for guidance and blessings. It is the Vision Serpent who provides the medium for contacting these deities.

It is believed that Lord Pakal's sarcophagus lid, which was located at Palenque, is probably “the single most comprehensive image which relates the Vision Serpent to Maya religion.” It depicts the death of Pakal and his descent into the Underworld. “The bicepalous serpent bar is placed horizontally on the World Tree and is the conduit for this transition. In the same way that the Vision Serpent represents a conduit between the physical world and the spirit realm of the ancestors, this bicephalous serpent bar represents a conduit between the realm of the living and the realm of the dead.”

== Maya jewelry and pottery ==
A piece of Maya jewelry depicts an “anthropomorphic, bicephalous serpent.” It is believed to have been worn during a bloodletting ceremony. It clearly shows the arrival of an ancestor from the spirit realm.

The portrayal of the Vision Serpent was very prevalent in Maya pottery. Vessels used during bloodletting ceremonies, depict the Vision serpent. The vessels below are excellent examples. They are carved in stone and are “some of the earliest depiction of Vision Serpent iconography. Blood spews forth from the open jaws of the front head. Although the rear is not physically attached, it sits just above the serpent's tail and also represents blood”.

== Maya architectural motifs ==
The Vision Serpent also finds a place in Maya architecture and is especially prominent in the decoration of pillars on the interior and exterior of Maya temples.

”In the palace at Labna, serpents adorn the corners of the principle facade. Characteristic of the Vision Serpent, there appears to be either an anthropomorphic deity or the spirit of an ancestor emanating from the gaping jaws of the serpent's mouth”.

== Contemporary observances ==
Remnants of the Vision Serpent have survived until modern times. Around 1930, J.E.S. Thompson noted in San Antonio, Belize, that the Q'eqchi' Maya still performed a ritual very similar to the vision quest of the classic Maya, although in a different context. The ritual marked the initiation of a new shaman for the village. The participant came into direct contact with a giant serpent, Ochan (Och-Kan). It was through this experience that he completed his initiation rites and gained the knowledge that is needed to become a powerful shaman.
