= Maya Bridge at Yaxchilan =

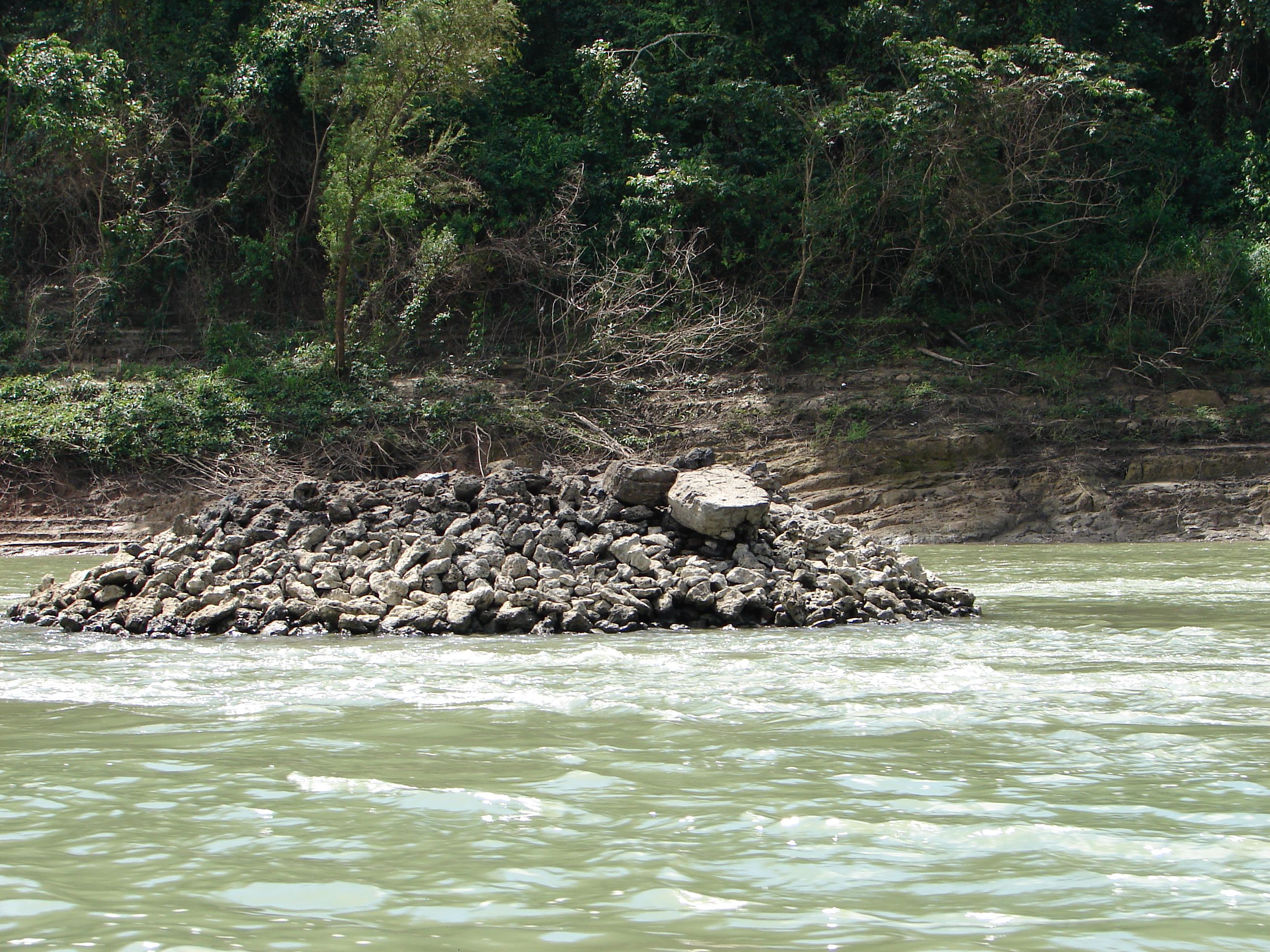
The Pile in the Usumacinta river thought to have possibly supported a suspension bridge at Yaxchilan

The Maya Bridge at Yaxchilan was a suspension bridge believed to have been built by the Maya across the Usumacinta River, Chiapas, Mexico. If so, it would have been the longest bridge discovered in the ancient world, dating from its construction by the Maya civilization in the late 7th century at Yaxchilan. It was a suspension bridge with a more or less level deck.

Now an archaeological site, Yaxchilan had long been known to include an unusual raised terrace beside the river and pier in the river; these structures were long theorized to be the remains of a bridge.

The Maya City-State of Yaxchilan, founded in the 4th century, became one of the most powerful Mayan kingdoms during the Maya Classic Period. During the height of its power the kings of Yaxchilan built temples, pyramids, and palaces clustered along the grand plaza extending along the shores of the Usumacinta River. This broad river, now separating Mexico from Guatemala, formed a large U-shaped bend (or "oxbow") that encompassed the city of Yaxchilan. This natural barrier protected the city from outside invasion but flooded heavily during the six-month rainy season, during which Yaxchilan became an island. An all-weather passage across the dangerous river was needed to gain access to the farmlands north of the city.

To survive and operate efficiently as the seat of power, Yaxchilan required a dependable passageway to provide an uninterrupted flow of traffic across the river on a year-round basis.

It was speculated that the Maya solved this problem by constructing a 100 m (330 ft)-long suspension bridge across the river in the late 7th century. The three-span bridge extended from a platform on the grand plaza of Yaxchilan crossing the river to the northern shore. The 63 m (207 ft) center span would have been the longest in the world until the construction of the Italian Trezzo sull'Adda Bridge in 1377. This would have required two piers in the river; a computer model is available illustrating this theory.

The ruins of the structure were investigated and reconstruction was created using computer simulation, remote sensing, and archaeoengineering techniques by Engineer James A O'Kon PE. The results were presented to the archaeological and engineering world in the pages of National Geographic magazine in 1995.
