= List of kings of Yaxchilan =

This is a list of kings of Yaxchilan. They were heads of state of the Maya civilization polity of Yaxchilan during its existence as a prominent city-state. The first high king (ajaw) was Yat Balam in the year 320. The dynasty probably ended in the late 9th century with the decline of Yaxchilan. The greatest of the high kings were Itzamnaaj B'alam II (commonly called Shield Jaguar) and his son Yaxun B'alam IV (commonly called Bird Jaguar).

== Known kings ==
All dates AD.

Name (or nickname)	Reign
Yopaat B'alam I	359–?
Itzamnaaj B'alam I ("Shield Jaguar I")	?–?
Bird Jaguar I	378–389
Yax Deer-Antler Skull	389–c.402
Ruler 5	c.402–?
K'inich Tatb'u Skull I	?–?
Moon Skull	-454–467
Bird Jaguar II	467–?
Knot-eye Jaguar I	-508–c.518
K'inich Tatb'u Skull II	526–537+
Knot-eye Jaguar II	-526+
Bird Jaguar III	629–669+
Itzamnaaj B'alam II ("Shield Jaguar II")	681–742
Yopaat B'alam II	-749+
Yaxun B'alam IV	752–768
Itzamnaaj B'alam III ("Shield Jaguar III")	769–800+
K'inich Tatb'u Skull III	-808+
