= Lady Eveningstar =

Ix Uhu't Chan Lem (Lady Eveningstar; Lady Ikʼ Skull)
- Ajaw
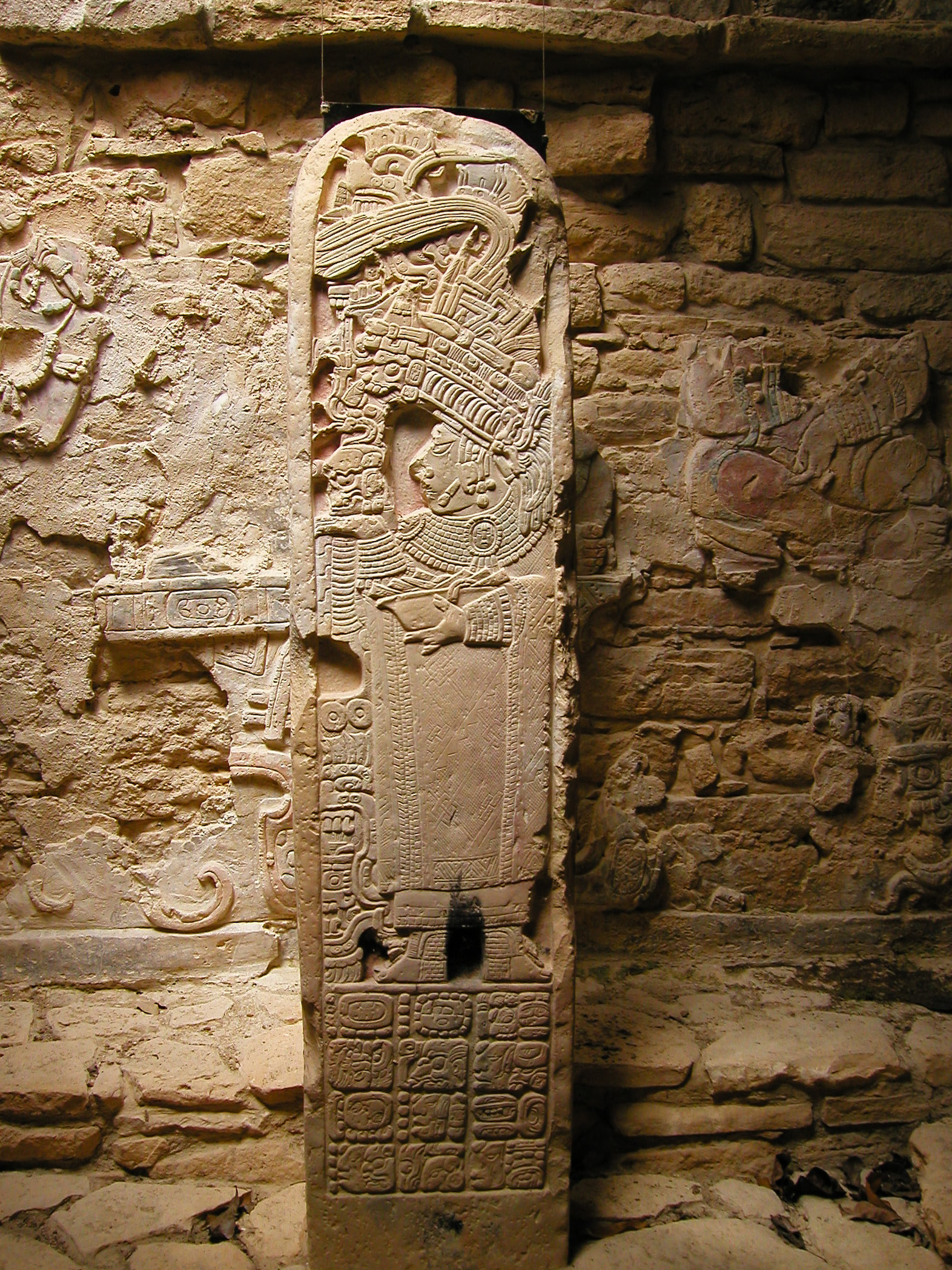
- Ix Uhu't Chan Lem's portrait on Stela 35

Queen of Yaxchilán
- Regency: 742-751 (as possible regent for her son)
- Born: 1 September 704; Calakmul
- Died: 751 (aged 46–47); Yaxchilán
- Burial: Yaxchilán
- Spouse: Itzamnaaj Bahlam III, King of Yaxchilán
- Issue: Yaxun Bahlam IV, King of Yaxchilán
- House: Snake dynasty
- Father: Yuknoom Tookʼ Kʼawiil, King of Calakmul (possibly)
- Mother: Lady of Stela 54 of Calakmul (possibly)
- Religion: Maya religion

Ix Uhu'l Chan Lem, previously nicknamed Lady Eveningstar or Lady Ikʼ Skull (704-751), was a Maya queen and possible regent, wife of Itzam Kokaaj Bʼalam III, a Maya king of Yaxchilan. Their son, Yaxun Bʼalam IV, also known as "Bird Jaguar", succeeded his father as king. She was possibly a regent between 742 and 751.

== Biography ==
Ix Uhu'l Chan Lem came to Yaxchilan from Dzibanche (because she was a "Kalo'mte' of the East", like K'ahk' Ti' Chich, king of the Kaan dynasty in Dzibanche). She was a secondary wife to Shield Jaguar the Great (Itzam Kokaaj Bʼalam III).

Although a secondary wife, Lady Ikʼ Skull may have ruled for a short time in Yaxchilan's history until her son Yaxun Bʼalam IV was old enough to take the throne. A review of the dynastic history of Yaxchilan during Itzamnaaj Bahlam's reign indicates that he had three wives: his aunt K'ab'al Xook, Lady Sak Bʼiyaan and Lady Ix Uhu'l Chan Lem, with K'ab'al Xook as the primary wife. Upon the death of Itzam Kokaaj Bahlam III, the right to the throne would traditionally go to his heir through Lady Xoc's line; however, this is not what happened and nearly ten years after his death it is his son from Lady Ikʼ Skull that took the throne.

There is a great deal of speculation as to why the son of a secondary wife took the throne and did so after the king had been dead for ten years. The current thinking is that the rightful heir through Lady Xook's lineage may have been her son, or perhaps a nephew or brother, but that this individual was captured during a conflict with Dos Pilas in 745. Information regarding this "interregnum" period tends to be conflicting. In their second revised edition, Martin and Grube note that at Piedras Negras there is mention of a new king at Yaxchilan, Yopaat Bahlam II, who may have ruled for part or all of this period. However, supporting evidence for this is unknown from Yaxchilan. On the other hand, Josserand notes that Lady Ikʼ Skull ruled as regent during this time and that it was not until her death that Bird Jaguar IV took the throne.

A monument which refers to Ix Uhu't Chan Lem is stela 35.
