= Lady Xoc =

Lady Kʼabʼal Xook
- Ajaw
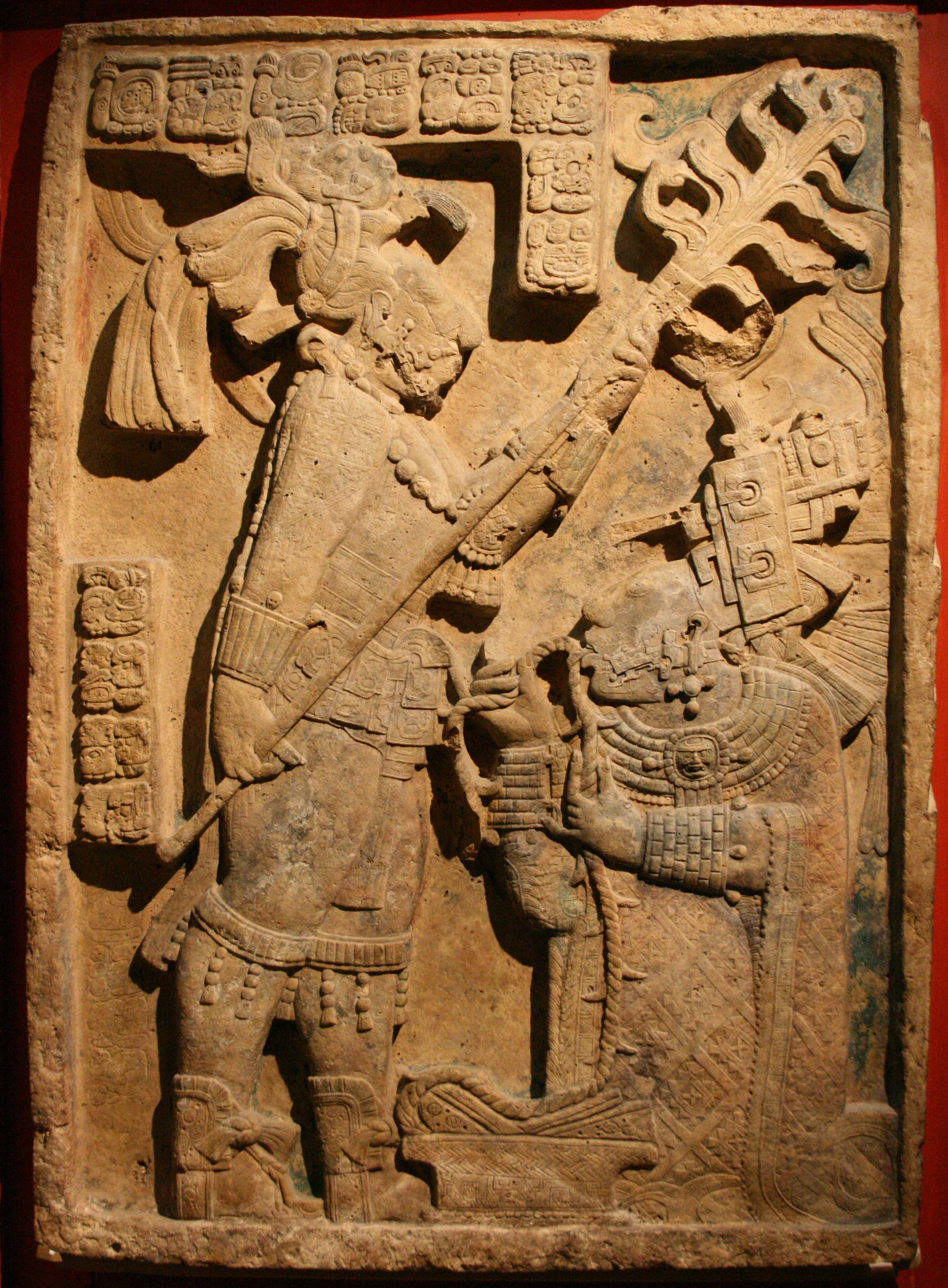
- Lintel 24 at Yaxchilan, Lady Xoc (seated) draws a barbed rope through her tongue

Queen consort of Yaxchilán
- Tenure: 23 October 681 - 15 June 742 (alongside Lady Sak B'iyaan and Lady Eveningstar of Calakmul)
- Predecessor: Lady Pakal (sister)
- Born: Yaxchilán
- Died: 3 April 749; Yaxchilán
- Spouse: Itzamnaaj Bahlam III (nephew)
- Mother: Lady Xibalba
- Religion: Maya religion

Lady Kʼabʼal Xook [kʼaɓal ʃoːk] or Lady Xoc (died 742), was a Maya queen who was the principal wife and aunt of King Itzamnaaj Bahlam III, who ruled the prominent kingdom of Yaxchilan from 681 to 742. She is believed by many to have been the sister of Lady Pacal.

Lady Xoc is best known for adorning Structure 23 in Yaxchilan with three lintels (Lintel 24, Lintel 25, and Lintel 26) that depict her performing rituals and sacrifices. Unless they were royal or deities, women were not depicted frequently in ancient Maya art. Royal Maya women may be depicted via texts and in iconography such as on lintels, but the fact that a woman appears as the central figure in these lintels is what makes them so unique and they have been of great value in reconstructing the historical role of royal women in Maya rituals and politics.

== Background ==
Lady Xoc's lineage is what led Itzamnaaj Bʼalam to his throne; for this reason, she was his principal wife. He was considered to be a great ruler of Yaxchilan. He was seen as a war leader of his time as he led many ritual battles with the surrounding city-states. He also erected many temples in Yaxchilan. Given that he was such a prominent and popular king, it is interesting to see that his principal wife, Lady Xoc, was one of the few women depicted in ancient Maya carvings. This fact alone speaks to Lady Xoc's popularity in Yaxchilan.

Most houses in Maya civilization were owned by the supernatural. Inomata and Houston identify only five structures owned by humans, and two of them were owned by women – Structure 11 and Structure 23. Structure 11 is owned by Ix Sak Biya꞉n who is also seen as a "woman of Itzamnaaj Bʼalam II". Structure 23 was owned by Lady Xoc. Structure 24, created later by King Bird Jaguar, holds the death dates of his most important ancestors: Shield Jaguar, his mother, and Lady Xoc. This structure is located near Structure 23; by recording Lady Xoc's death date, Bird Jaguar pays homage to his father's principal wife and the associated throne lineage.

== Structure 23 ==
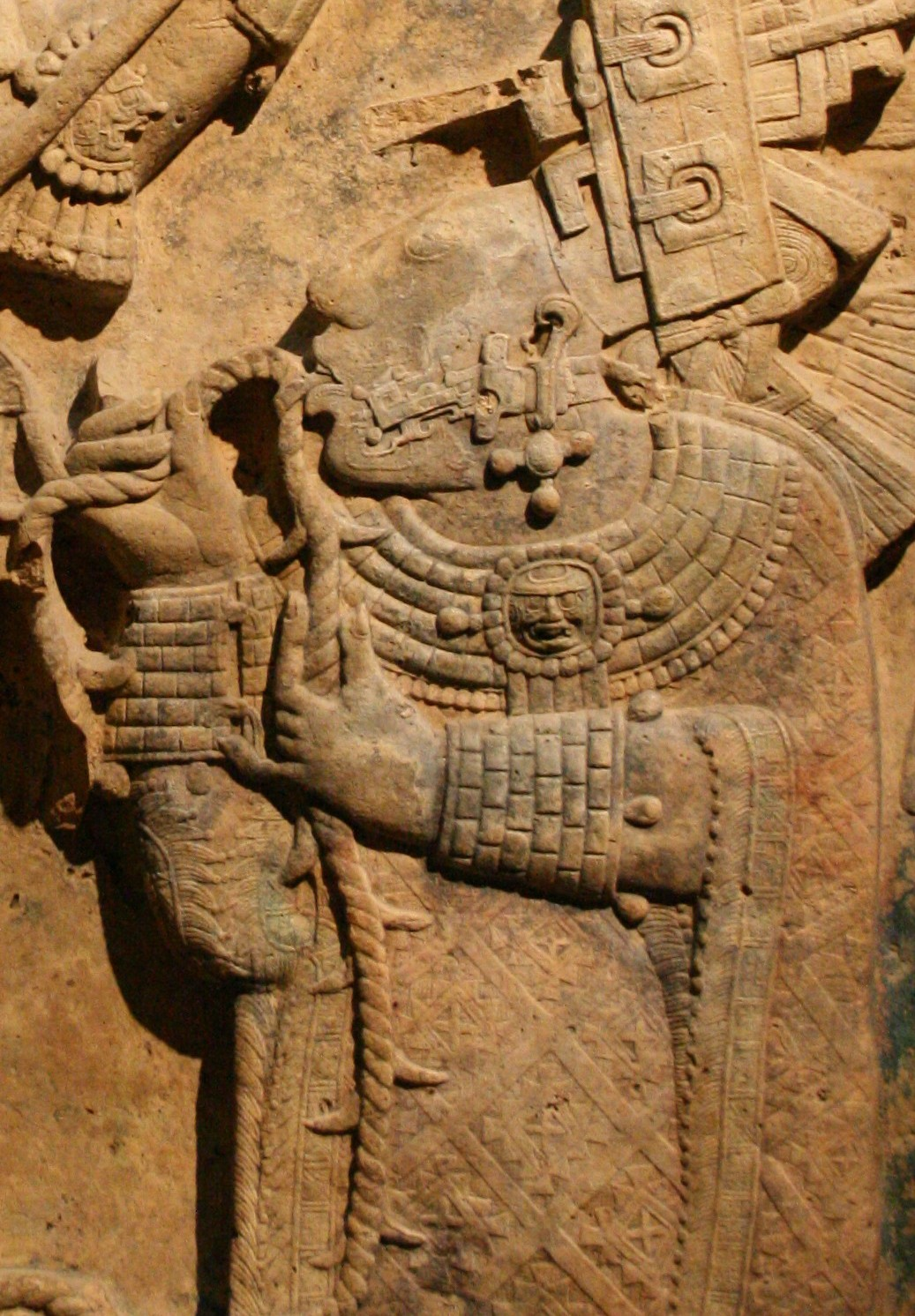
Detail of Lady Xoc on Lintel 24

Structure 23 is seen as Lady Xoc's place in Yaxchilan and, in general, a place where royal women could gather. To pay homage to Lady Xoc, Shield Jaguar dedicated Structure 23 to her. Unlike the other structures created during Shield Jaguar's time, Structure 23 does not depict warfare. Furthermore, Tate reports that "through the selection of astronomically significant dates, [the location of Structure 23] implies that the movement of the planets and sun are synchronized with the activities of the Yaxchilan kings and Lady Xoc". Many see Structure 23 as Lady Xoc's house because of the amount of privacy it provided – the four benches in the house are not located near doors. To claim Structure 23 as her own, Lady Xoc had three lintels (24, 25, and 26) placed above the doorway, thus asserting her prominence. Some historians discuss Structure 23 as queen's quarters for Lady Xoc, and it is often described as a place of great activity. Inscriptions on Lintel 25 have a term carved on it that mean "bee's house". Inomata and Houston believe that this sets up Structure 23 as a place for a woman - the queen's space. Also, Inomata and Houston report that many of the inscriptions on the lintels refer to it as Lady Xoc's "oto꞉t" which translates from Maya to "her space". By giving Lady Xoc a space of her own, Shield Jaguar put his principal wife in a place of great prominence and power in Yaxchilan.

Structure 23 has been identified as Lady Xoc's quarters because of the lintels found adorning the doorway. It has been suggested that the rituals depicted on these lintels may have occurred in Structure 23 – given that Lady Xoc is pictured in the lintels performing ritual sacrifices with her husband, this would mean Shield Jaguar entered the space of women with power.

The lintels adorning the doorways of Lady Xoc's house establishes the role of women in Yaxchilan society taking part in political, social, and ritual roles. From lintel 23 which shows Lady Xoc's genealogy and the ceremonies involving her home to the famous lintels (24, 25, and 26) that depict her taking a part of ritual and political aspects of Yaxchilan life, Lady Xoc's monuments depict her power and importance in Yaxchilan society.

Another reason Structure 23 is identified as Lady Xoc's is the fact that her tomb is held there. It is believed that the front right room of Structure 23 holds Lady Xoc's bones, as they are carved with her name. Furthermore, this burial is considered to be the most rich and elaborate in the royal household of Yaxchilan.

=== Lintels 24, 25, 26 ===
Lady Xoc donated three lintels to hang above the doors of a building in Yaxchilan's plaza. In the lintels, she is depicted performing central roles in ritual life. The lintels also were meant to show the hopes Shield Jaguar had for the kingdom. Putting up the lintels was a way for Shield Jaguar to pay respect to Lady Xoc, whose lineage made him king.

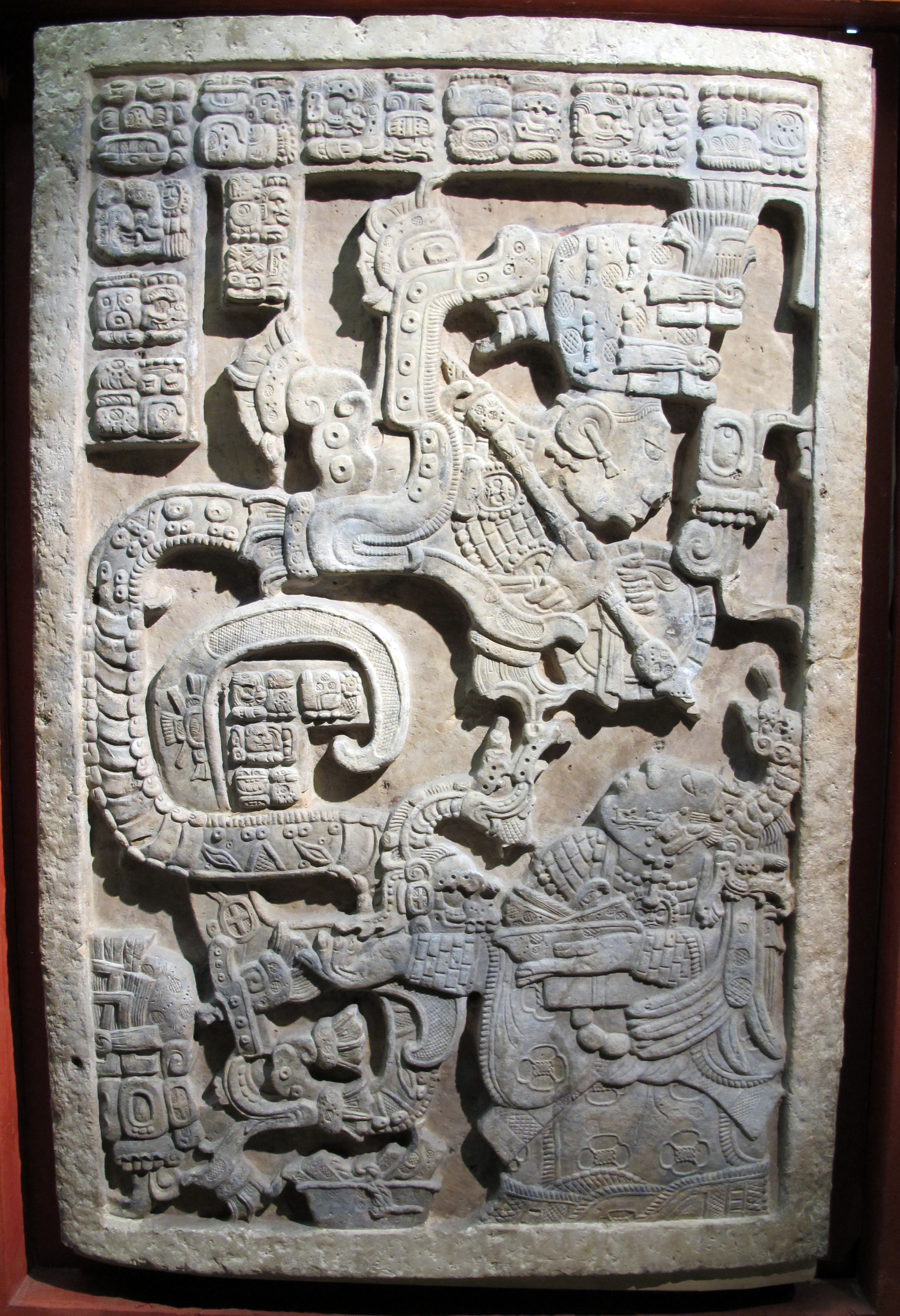
Lintel 25, Lady Xoc at lower right

Well known in the art world, lintels numbered 24, 25, and 26 are estimated to have been created in 725. In these lintels Lady Xoc is seen performing a bloodletting ritual in the presence of Shield Jaguar, communicating with a dead ancestor, and preparing the king for battle.

By looking at these lintels in order, we can see the role Lady Xoc played in war and in the ancient rituals of the Maya. In Lintel 24 Lady Xoc performs a blood sacrifice (or bloodletting ritual) by threading a thorned-rope through a hole in her tongue. In Yaxchilan, blood sacrifices were a way for kings to seek help or advice from departed ancestors. Blood sacrifices were seen as a way to gain the favor of the deities – essentially, preparing the king for battle.

In Lintel 25 we see the pinnacle of the blood sacrifice; we see that Lady Xoc places her blood beneath her in a bowl. We also see the two-headed Vision Serpent rising from the bowl of blood. Emerging from the two mouths are the bodies of a War God and the founder of Yaxchilan – Yat Balam. From this we can ascertain that King Shield Jaguar is seeking help from the deities and Yaxchilan ancestors as he prepares for battle. Lintel 25 also is reported to have inscriptions on it that indicate that the lintel is placed above the house of Lady Xoc. The phrase is translated by Inomata and Houston as: “Lady Xoc's house is the heart/center of Tan-Haʼ Yaxchilan” (p. 107).

Lintel 26 shows Shield Jaguar as he prepares for battle. Lady Xoc appears in the lintel as well, handing a helmet to the king. In this lintel Lady Xoc is wearing a headdress that Tate (1992) reports as occasionally being worn by kings on other sites at Yaxchilan. In Maya civilization the jaguar was a symbol of power. She also appears to be handing Shield Jaguar a spear. Both the spear and the jaguar helmet appear in other monuments with King Shield Jaguar (Inomata and Houston). As Shield Jaguar was a warrior king, Lady Xoc hands him a jaguar helmet for battle.

=== Lintel 23 ===
On the southwest door of Lady Xoc's house the lesser known Lintel 23 appears. It contains genealogies for Lady Xoc that were so important for the establishment of the king. That lintel was not donated by Lady Xoc. It has glyphs that further indicate Structure 23 as Lady Xoc's residence as it is inscribed to say “the opening/door of her house” (Insomata and Houston, p. 111, 2001). Lintel 23 depicts ceremonies involving Lady Xoc's house. The subjects depicted are related to two och-kʼakʼ ceremonies. These ceremonies involved modifications of the southwest doorways of the building as well as dedications of the carvings in Structure 23 (Inomata and Houston, 2001). Lintel 23 also shows that the ceremonies were attended mostly by women closely related to Lady Xoc. The fact that ceremonies were dedicated to Lady Xoc's house shows her stature in Yaxchilan. Furthermore, these ceremonies kept women involved in the social and political aspects of Yaxchilan society.
