= Yaxun Bʼalam IV =

King of the ancient Mayan city of Yaxchilan from 752 to 768

Yaxun Bʼahlam IV
- Ajaw
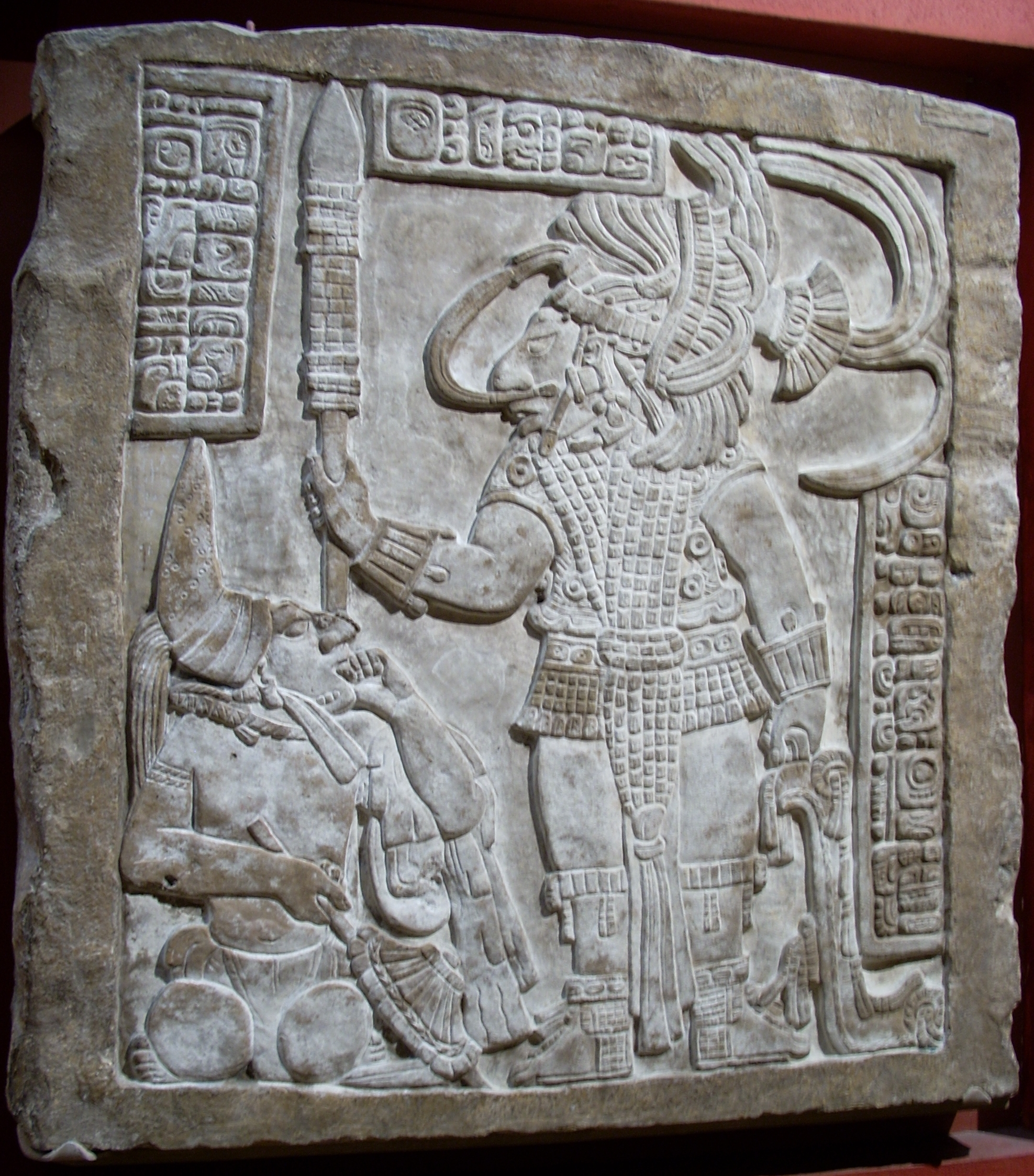
- Lintel 16 from Yaxchilan depicts king Yaxun Bʼahlam IV with his captive, king Pay Lakam Chahk of Santa Elena

King of Yaxchilan
- Reign: 3 May 752–768
- Predecessor: Itzamnaaj Bahlam III
- Successor: Itzamnaaj Bahlam IV
- Regent: Lady Eveningstar (possibly)
- Born: 27 August 709; Yaxchilán
- Died: 768 (aged 58–59); Yaxchilán
- Spouse: Lady Chak Joloom; Lady Wak Tuun of Motul de San José; Lady Wak Jalam Chan Ajaw of Motul de San José; Lady Mut Bahlam of Hix Witz
- Issue: Itzamnaaj Bahlam IV
- Father: Itzamnaaj Bahlam III
- Mother: Lady Eveningstar

Yaxun Bʼahlam IV, also called Bird Jaguar IV, was a Mayan king from Yaxchilan. He ruled from 752 until 768 AD, continuing the period of prosperity started by his father Itzamnaaj Bʼahlam III. He had to struggle to take and hold power, as he was not perceived to be the rightful heir to the throne.

== Early life ==
Yaxun Bʼahlam was the son of Itzamnaaj Bʼahlam and Lady Eveningstar. Lady Eveningstar was not the first wife of Itzamnaaj Bʼahlam and was from Calakmul.

As Bird Jaguar was not the son of Lady Xook (Itzamnaaj Bʼahlam's first wife-aunt), he was not completely of the royal blood and would have difficulty acquiring the throne. Itzamnaaj Bʼahlam commissioned a stele to be carved showing both Yaxun Bʼahlam and Lady Xook in the same panel, thus legitimating Yaxun.

== Accession ==
There is a ten-year gap between the death of Itzamnaaj Bʼahlam III and the beginning of the reign of Yaxun Bʼahlam. A contemporaneous inscription from Piedras Negras mentions a ruler named Sak Jukub Yopaat B'ahlam being in office in July 749. On that day, Sak Jukub Yopaat B'ahlam witnessed the anniversary of Piedras Negras Ruler 4's accession. Either Sak Jukub erected no monuments, or they were destroyed by Yaxun B'ahlam, as he is only mentioned one time at Piedras Negras. This may indicate a struggle for the throne. Also, as Piedras Negras and Yaxchilan were rivals, this could have meant that Piedras Negras had gained control of Yaxchilan for a short time or at least had a more peaceful dynamic during those years.

His accession was uniquely marked by a ritual dance with the K'awiil sceptre. Yaxun Bʼahlam took the throne on May 3, 752, but he had problems even after he succeeded. In order to legitimize his claim to the throne, Yaxun Bʼahlam had a series of stelae created that pictured him with his father (including Stele 11).

== Reign ==
Several buildings were constructed during the reign of Yaxun Bʼahlam, including Temple 33 and Temple 21. During his life, he captured at least 21 people, as evidenced by the statement on Yaxchilan Stela 11. His seventeen-year reign was much shorter than that of his father's, and he died in 768. Within a generation of his death, the building projects at Yaxchilan had ceased. He was succeeded by his son Itzamnaaj Bahlam IV in 769.

== Marriages ==
Yaxun Bʼahlam had married Lady Chak Joloom, Lady Wak Tuun of Motul de San José, Lady Wak Jalam Chan Ajaw of Motul de San José, Lady Mut Bahlam of Hix Witz.

Preceded by Itzamnaaj Bahlam III	High Kings of Yaxchilan; 752–768	Succeeded by Itzamnaaj Bahlam IV
