= Itzamnaaj Bahlam II =

Maya ruler of the city of Yaxchilan

- High King of Yaxchilan, Ajaw

King of Yaxchilan
- Reign: c.599-611 (possibly)
- Predecessor: Joy Bahlam II
- Successor: Kʼinich Tatʼbu Jol III
- Born: Yaxchilan
- Died: Yaxchilan
- Issue: Kʼinich Tatʼbu Jol III (possibly)
- Father: Joy Bahlam II (possibly)
- Religion: Maya religion

Itzamnaaj Bʼalam II was a Mayan king who ruled in Yaxchilan. Experts usually date his reign between the end of the 6th century and the beginning of the 7th century, around 599 or even until around 610. Very little is known of him. He is also called Shield Jaguar by modern writers, based on the name glyph before the phonetic name was deciphered.

== Bibliography ==
- Martin, Simon; Nikolai Grube (2008). Chronicle of the Maya Kings and Queens: Deciphering the Dynasties of the Ancient Maya (2nd, revised ed.). London and New York: Thames & Hudson. ISBN 978-0-500-28726-2. OCLC 191753193.
- Schele, Linda; David Freidel (1992). A Forest of Kings: The Untold Story of the Ancient Maya (pbk reprint ed.). New York: Harper Perennial. ISBN 0-688-11204-8. OCLC 145324300.
- Sharer, Robert J.; Loa P. Traxler (2006). The Ancient Maya (6th, fully revised ed.). Stanford, CA: Stanford University Press. ISBN 0-8047-4816-0. OCLC 28067148.
