= Yaxchilan =

Ancient Mayan city in Chiapas, Mexico

Q'Yaxchilan
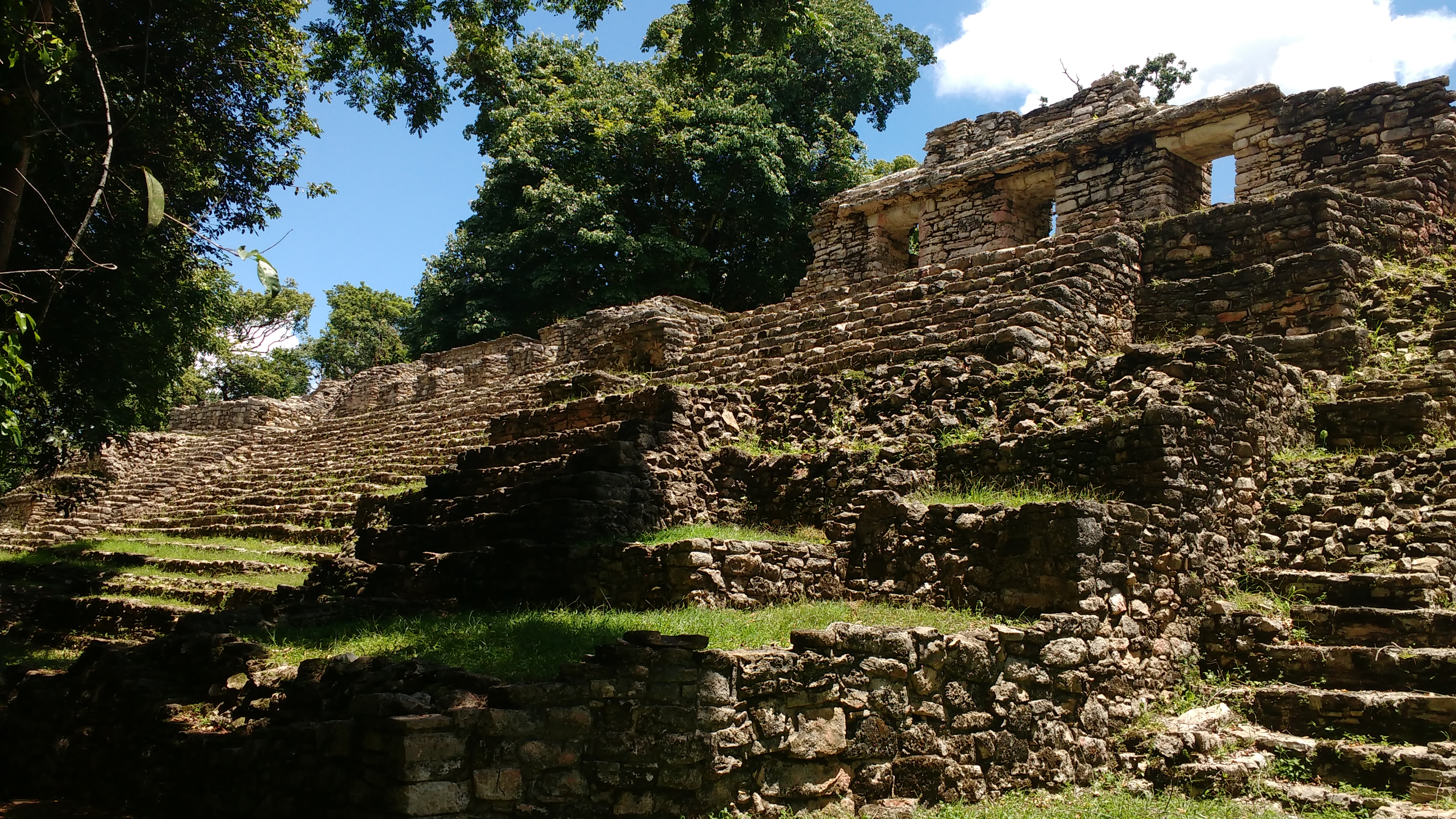
- Structure 33 at Yaxchilan

- Location of the site Yaxchilan (Mexico) Yaxchilan (Guatemala)
- 16°54′N 90°58′W
- Type: Settlement
- Cultures: Maya civilization
- Location: Chiapas, Mexico

History
- Built: 300-900 AD (Classic)
- Abandoned: 900 AD

Site notes
- Condition: In ruins

Yaxchilan (pronounced [ʝaʃtʃiˈlan]) is an ancient Maya city located on the bank of the Usumacinta River in the state of Chiapas, Mexico. In the Late Classic Period Yaxchilan was one of the most powerful Maya states along the course of the Usumacinta River, with Piedras Negras as its major rival. Architectural styles in subordinate sites in the Usumacinta region demonstrate clear differences that mark a clear boundary between the two kingdoms.

Yaxchilan was a large center, important throughout the Classic era, and the dominant power of the Usumacinta River area. It dominated such smaller sites as Bonampak, and had a long rivalry with Piedras Negras and at least for a time with Tikal; it was a rival of Palenque, with which Yaxchilan warred in 654.

The site is particularly known for its well-preserved sculptured stone lintels set above the doorways of the main structures. These lintels, together with the stelae erected before the major buildings, contain hieroglyphic texts describing the dynastic history of the city.

== Etymology ==
Epigraphers think that the ancient name for the city was probably the same as that of its realm, Pa' Chan. pronounced [paʔ tʃan], meaning "Cleft (or broken) Sky". Early archaeologist Désiré Charnay dubbed the ruins "Lorillard City" in honor of Pierre Lorillard who contributed to defray the expense of his expedition into the Maya zone, while Alfred Maudslay named it "Menché". pronounced [menˈtʃe] Teoberto Maler gave it its modern name, said to mean "Green Stones" in an unspecified Maya language. For some time, the Emblem Gylph was read as Siyaj Chan, or "Sky Born".

== Location ==
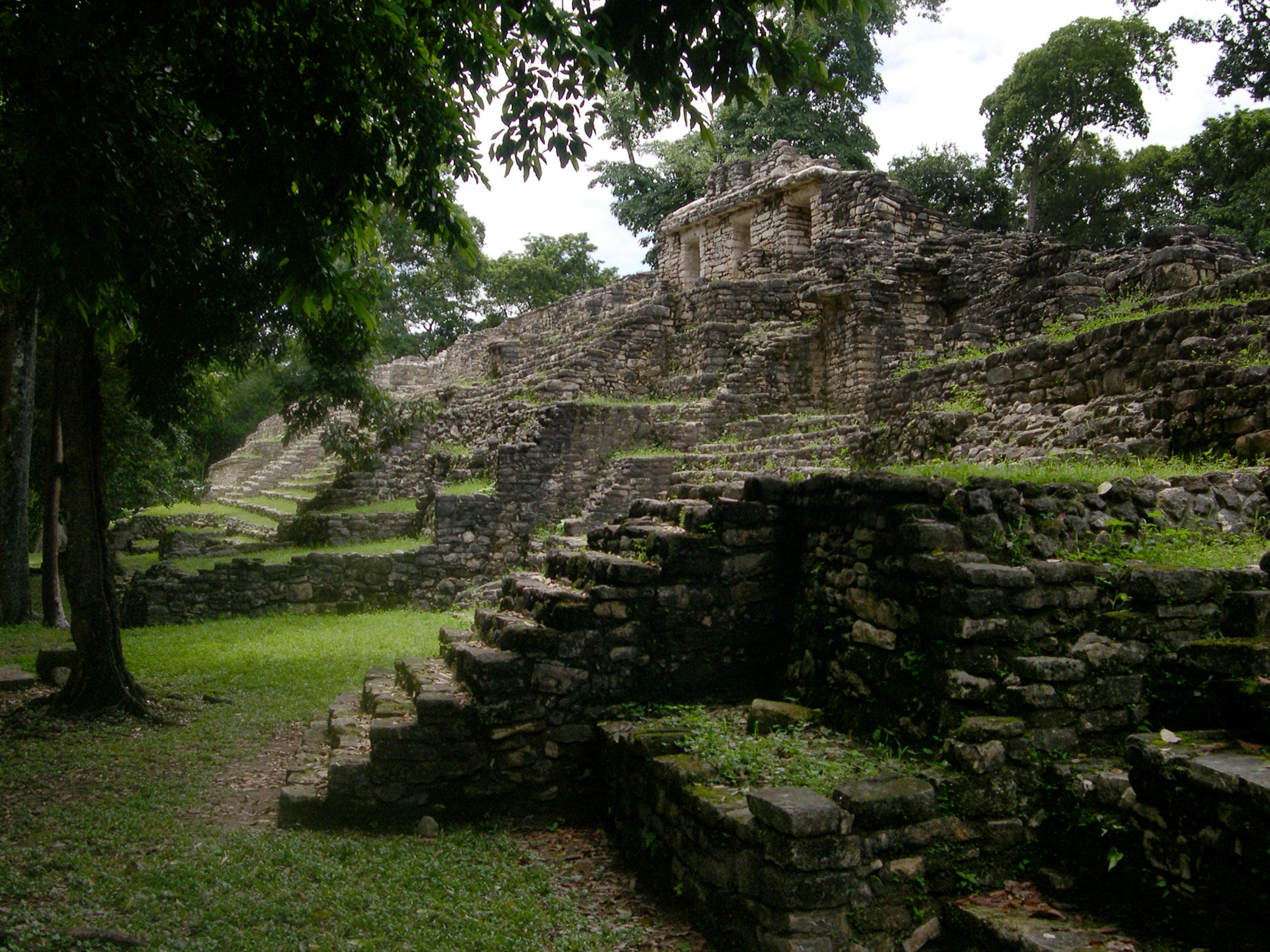
West Acropolis of Yaxchilan

Yaxchilan is located on the south bank of the River, at the apex of a horseshoe-shaped meander. This loop defends the site on all sides except for a narrow land approach from the south. The site is 40 kilometres (25 mi) upriver from the ruins of Piedras Negras, its major rival. Yaxchilan is 21 kilometres (13 mi) from the ruins of Bonampak. The site lies in Ocosingo Municipality in the state of Chiapas, on the Mexican side of the international border with Guatemala, which follows the line of river. It is 80 kilometres (50 mi) downriver from the Maya site Altar de Sacrificios.

== History ==
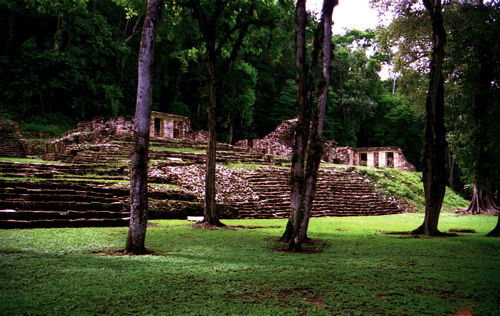
View of the Main Plaza at Yaxchilan

Yaxchilan has its origins in the Preclassic Period. A large part of what is known of the Classic Period history of the city comes from the hieroglyphic texts of the kings who ruled during its Late Classic apogee, one of the most important of which is Hieroglyphic Stairway 1. Some retrospective inscriptions appear to have been used to rewrite Yaxchilan's dynastic history to suit king Bird Jaguar IV. Before the rule of king Itzamnaaj Balam II, who reigned from 681 to 742, the city was relatively small. The city-state then grew to a regional capital and the dynasty lasted into the early 9th century.

=== Early Classic ===
The known history of Yaxchilan starts with the enthronement of Yopaat B'alam I, most likely on 23 July 359. He was the founder of a long dynasty and took the throne when Yaxchilan was still a minor site. Hieroglyphic inscriptions dating to the Late Classic describe a series of wars in the Early Classic between the city and its neighbors. K'inich Tatb'u Skull I ruled in the early 5th century and was the first of the rulers of Yaxchilan to be recorded as having taken a rival king as a war captive, his prisoner being king Bird Jaguar of Bonampak (not to be confused with the four rulers of Yaxchilan who bore the same name). The long-running rivalry with Piedras Negras had already begun by the fifth century AD, with both cities struggling to dominate the Usumacinta trade route. King Moon Skull was credited with gaining a victory over Piedras Negras in 460 and with capturing the enemy king, known only as Ruler A. By the middle of the 5th century, Yaxchilan had formal contacts with the great city of Tikal. Bird Jaguar II, the next king of Yaxchilan, captured a vassal of the king of Piedras Negras around 478.

Knot-eye Jaguar I was a warlike king who was recorded as capturing nobles from Bonampak, Piedras Negras, and the great city of Tikal. In 514, Knot-eye Jaguar I was taken captive by Ruler C of Piedras Negras, as depicted on Lintel 12 from that city, where he is shown kneeling before the enemy king with his wrists bound.

His successor, K'inich Tatb'u Skull II, was enthroned on 11 February 526. This king is notable for the series of carved lintels he commissioned, including a dynastic list that provides information on the early kings of the city. K'inich Tatb'u Skull II oversaw a revival of Yaxchilan's fortunes, and he captured lords from Bonampak, Lakamtuun and, notably, the lord of Calakmul, one of the two great Maya powers of the Classic Period, as well as a success against Tikal, the second great power.

Little is known of the history of Yaxchilan from 537 to 629, although four kings are known to have reigned in this period. Knot-eye Jaguar II is known to have captured the lord of Lacanha in 564, one of the few events that can be identified from this period. It may be that the lack of an inscribed history for this lengthy period indicates that Yaxchilan had fallen under the dominion of a more powerful neighbor, such as Piedras Negras Palenque or Toniná, all of which were powerful polities in the Usumacinta region at this time.

=== Late Classic ===
The Yaxchilano murals at Bonampak's Structure I commemorate Yaxchilan's appointment of Chan Muwaan I as subordinate ruler. Yaxchilan rebuilt the site to point back toward Yaxchilan.

In 629, Bird Jaguar III was enthroned as king of Yaxchilan. In 646 or 647 he captured a lord from the site of Hix Witz (meaning "Jaguar Hill"), somewhere on the north side of the Usumacinta, most likely Zapote Bobal or Pajaral located to the south of the San Pedro Martir river in the Petén department of Guatemala, based on the findings of epigrapher David Stuart (Mayanist).

Yaxchilan reached its greatest power during the reigns of King Itzamnaaj B'alam II, who died in his 90s in 742, and his son Bird Jaguar IV. Itzamnaaj B'alam II was enthroned in October 681 and he ruled for more than sixty years. During the last third of his reign he was responsible for a monumental building programme that included the erection of magnificent buildings with richly carved lintels, hieroglyphic stairways and carved stelae, transforming the centre of the city. During his reign, the kingdom of Yaxchilán extended to include the nearby sites of La Pasadita and El Chicozapote to the northwest of the city. At times the sites of Lacanha and Bonampak appear to have been under his domination, although this region was controlled by Toniná in 715.

In 689, relatively early in his reign, Itzamnaaj B'alam II is recorded as having captured Aj Sak Ichiy Pat. In 713 he captured Aj K'an Usja, the ajaw, or lord, of B'uktunn, an otherwise unknown site. In 726, Yaxchilan was defeated by its rival Piedras Negras, an event described on Piedras Negras Stela 8. A sajal (subordinate lord) of Itzamnaaj B'alam II was captured by the enemy city, an event that is completely absent from inscriptions at Yaxchilán itself although, importantly, there is no false claim of victory. It is after this period, over forty years into the reign of Itzamnaaj B'alam II, that this king embarked upon his impressive building programme, this may indicate that at this time Yaxchilan was able to exert independence from the hegemony of once powerful neighbours and claim greater political independence and more lucrative control of riverine trade. In 729, Itzamnaaj B'alam II captured Aj Popol Chay, the lord of Lacanha. This event, together with the other victories of Itzamnaaj Balam II's reign, is described both in the hieroglyphic texts of Structure 44 and also on a series of stelae near Structure 41. This victory over Lacanha is compared to the earlier victory of Knot-eye Jaguar II against the same city. Similarly, his capture of a lord of Hix Witz in 732 is compared to Bird Jaguar III's victory over the same site.

In 749, Yopaat B'alam II of Yaxchilan attended a ceremony to honour Itzam K'an Ahk II of Piedras Negras. If Yopaat B'alam II was king of Yaxchilan at this time, this would indicate that he was subordinate to the king of Piedras Negras. This event was recorded on Piedras Negras Panel 3; there are no records of the reign of Yopaat B'alam II at Yaxchilan itself, indicating that any records were later destroyed if he had indeed ruled there.

Yaxchilan retaliated in 759, gaining a victory over its enemy. Circa 790 CE, Yaxchilan's king Shield Jaguar III oversaw the installation of Chan Muwaan II in Bonampak, and hired Yaxchilano artisans to commemorate it (and the previous Chan Muwaan) in "Structure I"'s murals.

In 808, king K'inich Tatb'u Skull III marked his capture of K'inich Yat Ahk II, the last king of Piedras Negras, an event that probably represented the final overthrow of Yaxchilan's long running enemy, ending dynastic rule there and destroying the city as a capital.

=== Modern history ===
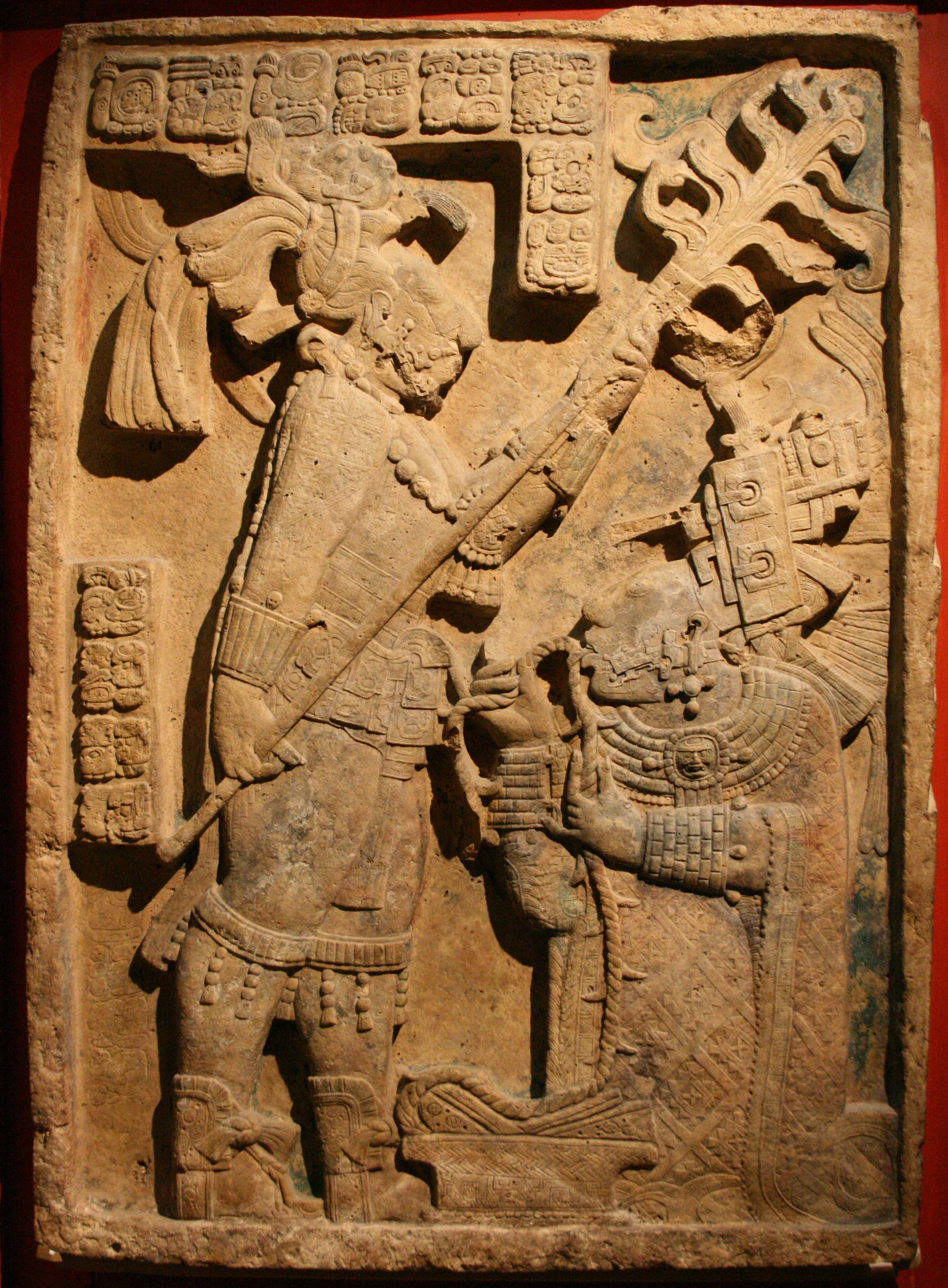
Lintel 24, structure 23, Yaxchilan. The sculpture depicts a sacred blood-letting ritual which took place on October 28, 709. King Itzamnaaj B'alam II is shown holding a torch, while his wife Lady K'ab'al Xook draws a barbed rope through her pierced tongue, British Museum.

The first published mention of the site seems to have been a brief mention by Juan Galindo in 1833, published by the Royal Geographical Society. Professor Edwin Rockstoh of the National College of Guatemala visited in 1881 and published another short account.

Explorers Alfred Maudslay and Désiré Charnay arrived here within days of each other in 1882, and they published more detailed accounts of the ruins with drawings and photographs. Maudslay ordered several lintels to be removed, and the British Museum acquired lintels 24 in 1932. Maudslay's report was published by the Royal Geographical Society in 1883. Teoberto Maler visited the site repeatedly from 1897 to 1900, his detailed two volume description of the ruins and other nearby sites was published by the Peabody Museum of Harvard University in 1903.

In 1931 Sylvanus Morley led a Carnegie Institution expedition to Yaxchilan, mapped the site and discovered more monuments.

From 1970 onwards, Ian Graham made numerous visits to Yaxchilan and recorded the inscriptions there. These inscriptions were published from 1977 onwards in the Corpus of Maya Hieroglyphic Inscriptions by the Peabody Museum of Harvard University.

The Mexican National Institute of Anthropology and History (INAH) conducted archeological research at Yaxchilan in 1972–1973, again in 1983, and further INAH work was conducted in the early 1990s. INAH has consolidated and preserved the central portion of the site.

Mayanist Tatiana Proskouriakoff did some pioneering work on deciphering Maya writing using the inscriptions of Yaxchilan, and was able to identify the glyphs for death, capture and captor. Since then Peter Mathews and others have expanded on her early work.

Since 1990, the project La Pintura Mural Prehispánica en México (Prehispanic Wall Painting in Mexico) of the Instituto de Investigaciones Estéticas of the Universidad Nacional Autónoma de México has examined and recorded precolumbian murals such as those at Yaxchilan.

Yaxchilan has long been difficult to reach other than by river. Until recently, no roads existed within 100 miles. The only ways to get to the site were hundreds of miles by boat, or else by small plane. Since the construction of the Border Highway by the Mexican Government in the early 1980s, it is possible for tourists to visit. To reach the site, it is necessary now only to take an hour-long boat ride down the Usumacinta River from Frontera Corozal.

Some Lacandon Maya still make pilgrimages to Yaxchilan to carry out rituals to the Maya gods.

== The site ==
The site contains impressive ruins, with palaces and temples bordering a large plaza upon a terrace above the Usumacinta River. The architectural remains extend across the higher terraces and the hills to the south of the river, overlooking both the river itself and the lowlands beyond. Yaxchilan is known for the large quantity of excellent sculpture at the site, such as the monolithic carved stelae and the narrative stone reliefs carved on lintels spanning the temple doorways. Over 120 inscriptions have been identified on the various monuments from the site.

The major groups are the Central Acropolis, the West Acropolis and the South Acropolis. The South Acropolis occupies the highest part of the site. The site is aligned with relation to the Usumacinta River, at times causing unconventional orientation of the major structures, such as the two ballcourts.

=== Structures ===
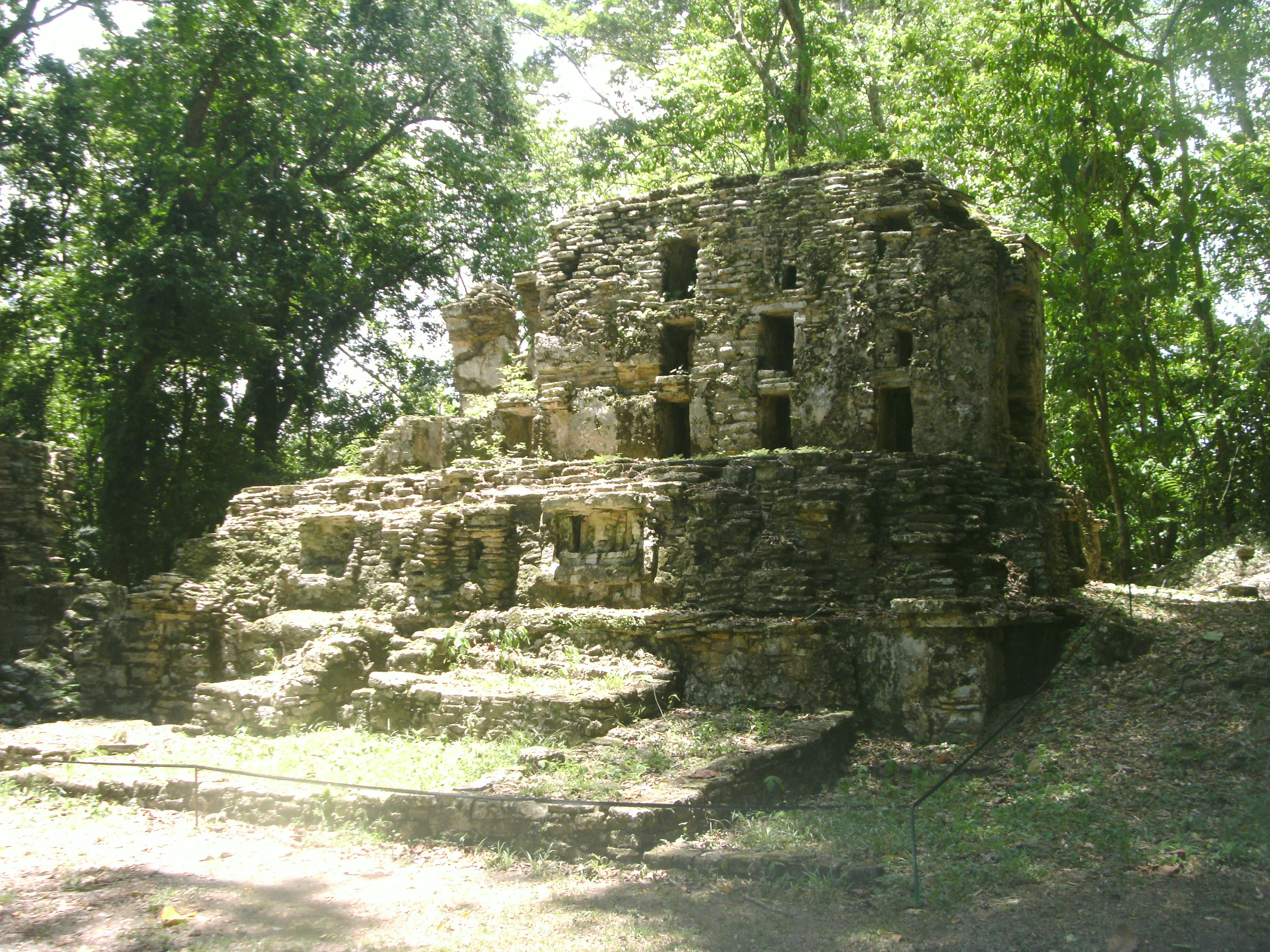
Structure 6, south façade

Structure 6 is near the Main Plaza in the Central Acropolis. It is in a good state of preservation and has six doorways, three facing the plaza and three facing the river. The doorways that open onto the plaza were blocked up in antiquity and new doorways were cut into the sides of the structure. The facade of the building facing the plaza has a surviving frieze with a sculpture of a head. The structure has a surviving perforated roof comb and is believed to date to the Early Classic.

Structure 7 is beside Structure 6 but is in a much poorer state of preservation, with its vaulted ceiling having collapsed. This structure also had doorways facing both the river and the Main Plaza.

Structure 8 is located in the Main Plaza in front of Structure 7 and divides the plaza into northwestern and southeastern sections.

Structure 9 is an unrestored mound northwest of Structure 7. Stela 27 stands in front of it.

Structure 10 shares an L-shaped platform with Structures 13 and 74, in the Central Acropolis. The structure contains a series of hieroglyphic lintels describing the birth and accession of king Bird Jaguar IV.

Structure 12 is a small structure in the Central Acropolis, close to the river. It contained eight lintels dating to the early 6th century. The structure is located in the Central Acropolis close to one of the ballcourts. The lintels record nine generations of rulers of the city. The lintels were commissioned by K'inich Tatb'u Skull II, their original location is unknown, being reset into Structure 12 in the 8th century by king Bird Jaguar IV. Some of the lintels remain in place.

Structure 13 rests on an L-shaped platform in the Central Acropolis, together with Structures 10 and 74.

Structure 14 is the northwest ballcourt. It is located on the Main Plaza of the Central Acropolis. Five sculpted ballcourt markers were found here, three of which were aligned on the playing area and one on each of the platforms to either side. One of the ballcourt markers was removed from the site, the rest are broken and eroded.

Structure 16 is close to the northwest ballcourt. It contains Lintels 38 through to 40, which have been reset in their original positions.

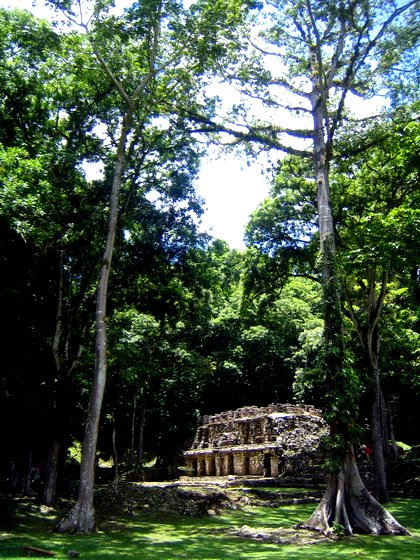
Structure 19 in the Central Acropolis.

Structure 19 is also known as the Labyrinth. It lies at the western edge of the Central Acropolis. The structure is a temple with rooms spread over three levels, linked by interior stairways. The temple facade has four doorways, with three doorway-sized niches between them. Two sculptured altars are located in front of the structure, which still has the remains of a perforated roof comb.

Structure 20 is in the Central Acropolis and has three rooms. The three doorways to this structure once supported sculpted Lintels 12, 13 and 14, although only two now remain. A small amount of the roof comb of the building remains, and the sloped roof still has surviving friezes containing niches. Structure 20 was excavated by Ian Graham in 1982, during the excavations a hieroglyphic step was found in front of the building, it was reburied in order to preserve it.

Structure 21 is on a terrace below Structure 25 and 26. The three lintels over the doorways in this structure were Lintels 15 through to 17, although they were removed in the 19th century and are now in the British Museum in London. Structure 21 was excavated in 1983. The vaulted roof of the structure had already collapsed before 1882, filling the rooms with rubble that has now been removed, uncovering several important monuments, including Stela 35 and the remains of life size stucco figures on the back wall behind the stela itself.

Structure 22 is on a terrace in the Central Acropolis near the Main Plaza. It still has sculptured lintels in place.

Structure 23 is in the Central Acropolis, overlooking the Main Plaza. It was built during the reign of Itzamnaaj B'alam II and is especially significant because it was the first major construction undertaken after a lapse of 150 years. Structure 23 is dedicated to Lady K'ab'al Xook, a wife of the king. It originally had three lintels set above its doorways that appear to mark the re-founding of Yaxchilan in an effort to reinforce the lineage and right to rule of king Itzamnaaj B'alam II. Lintels 24 and 25 were removed at the end of the 19th century and are now in the British Museum, while Lintel 26 is in the Museo Nacional de Antropología in Mexico City. This series of lintels are among the finest relief sculpture surviving in the Maya region.

Structure 24 is on a terrace near the Main Plaza in the Central Acropolis. It still has sculptured lintels in place.

Structure 25 is in the Central Acropolis close to the approach to Structure 33. It has not been excavated or restored, although it has some intact vaulting.

Structure 26 is located beside Structure 25 in the Central Acropolis and has not been excavated. It is the least well preserved of the two structures.

Structure 30 is in the Central Acropolis, it has three doorways facing onto the Plaza. The structure has two parallel rooms with well-preserved vaulting.

Structure 33, in the Central Acropolis, has been described as a masterpiece in stone and was probably dedicated in 756 by Bird Jaguar IV. The structure overlooks the plaza and the river and would have been prominent to river traffic in the 8th century. It has plain lower walls with three doorways, each of which supports a well-preserved lintel (Yaxchilan Lintels 1 to 3). In the centre of the back wall of the structure, opposite the central doorway, is a niche containing the headless sculpture of a human figure, probably Bird Jaguar IV himself. The roof of the structure is largely intact, including a sloped roof supporting a frieze and a well-preserved roof comb. There are niches in both the roof comb and the frieze, the niche in the roof comb contains the remains of a sculpted figure. Tennons on both roof sections once supported stucco decoration. Leading up to the front of Structure 33 from the plaza is a stairway, the top step of which is sculpted, this step is known as Hieroglyphic Stairway 2.

The South Acropolis consists of Structures 39, 40 and 41. A number of stelae and altars are associated with them.

Structure 39 has been restored and lies within the South Acropolis. It has three stepped doorways that open onto a single, irregularly shaped room. The remains of a perforated roof comb survive, with tenons that once supported stucco decoration.

Structure 40 is flanked by structures 39 and 41. It has been restored and also has three doorways opening onto a single room and the remains of a perforated roof comb. The room has the remains of murals that once covered all the interior walls. Stelae 12 and 13 stand before structure 40 and Stela 11 once stood between them.

Structure 41 has also been restored. Like the other two structures in the South Acropolis, it has three doorways that open onto a single room. It is not as well preserved as Structures 39 and 40 and much of the vaulted roof has collapsed. A fraction of stucco frieze from the sculpture may date the building to 740, the 3rd K'atun anniversary of Itzamnaaj B'alam II's reign. The central doorway is stepped and the front wall has been buttressed. It is one of three principal structures atop the highest vantage point in the city and a series of stelae was set in front of it that described the military campaigns of Itzamnaaj B'alam II.

Structure 42 is located in the West Acropolis. The structure had a series if carved limestone lintels that depict Bird Jaguar IV's efforts to consolidate power, emulating events carried out by his father Itzamnaaj B'alam II.

Structure 44 is in the West Acropolis. It still contains a carved lintel, and has sculpted steps. A number of stelae were originally associated with Structure 44. This temple was built by Itzamnaaj B'alam II and was dedicated around 732. The sculpted texts from this building provide an account of the 8th century resurgence of the city. Each of the three doorways contained sculptured lintels and two hieroglyphic steps.

Structure 67 is the southeast ballcourt, located in the Central Acropolis.

=== Monuments ===
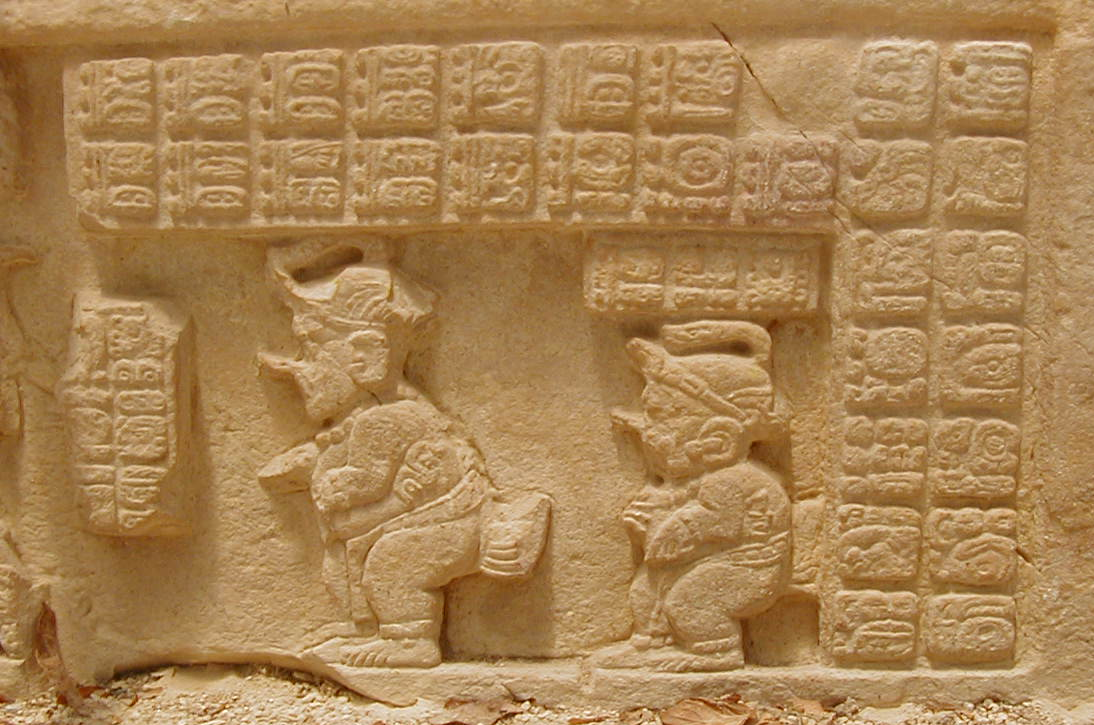
Section of step VII from Hieroglyphic Stairway 2 leading to Structure 33, related to the ballgame and dating to 757.

==== Hieroglyphic stairways ====
Hieroglyphic Stairway 1 leads up to Structure 5 in the Central Acropolis. It has six sculpted risers consisting of various carved blocks, many of which are heavily eroded.

Hieroglyphic Stairway 2 is the riser of the uppermost step approaching Structure 33. It consists of 13 sculptured blocks, numbered from left to right as Steps I to XIII. Steps VI, VII and XVIII are extremely well preserved and depict Bird Jaguar IV and two of his predecessors dressed as ball players.

==== Lintels ====
Lintel 1 is above the eastern doorway of Structure 33 in the Central Acropolis. It depicts 8th-century king Bird Jaguar IV accompanied by his wife Lady Great Skull Zero.

Lintel 2 is set above the central doorway of Structure 33. It shows Bird Jaguar IV accompanied by his son and heir, Shield Jaguar II.

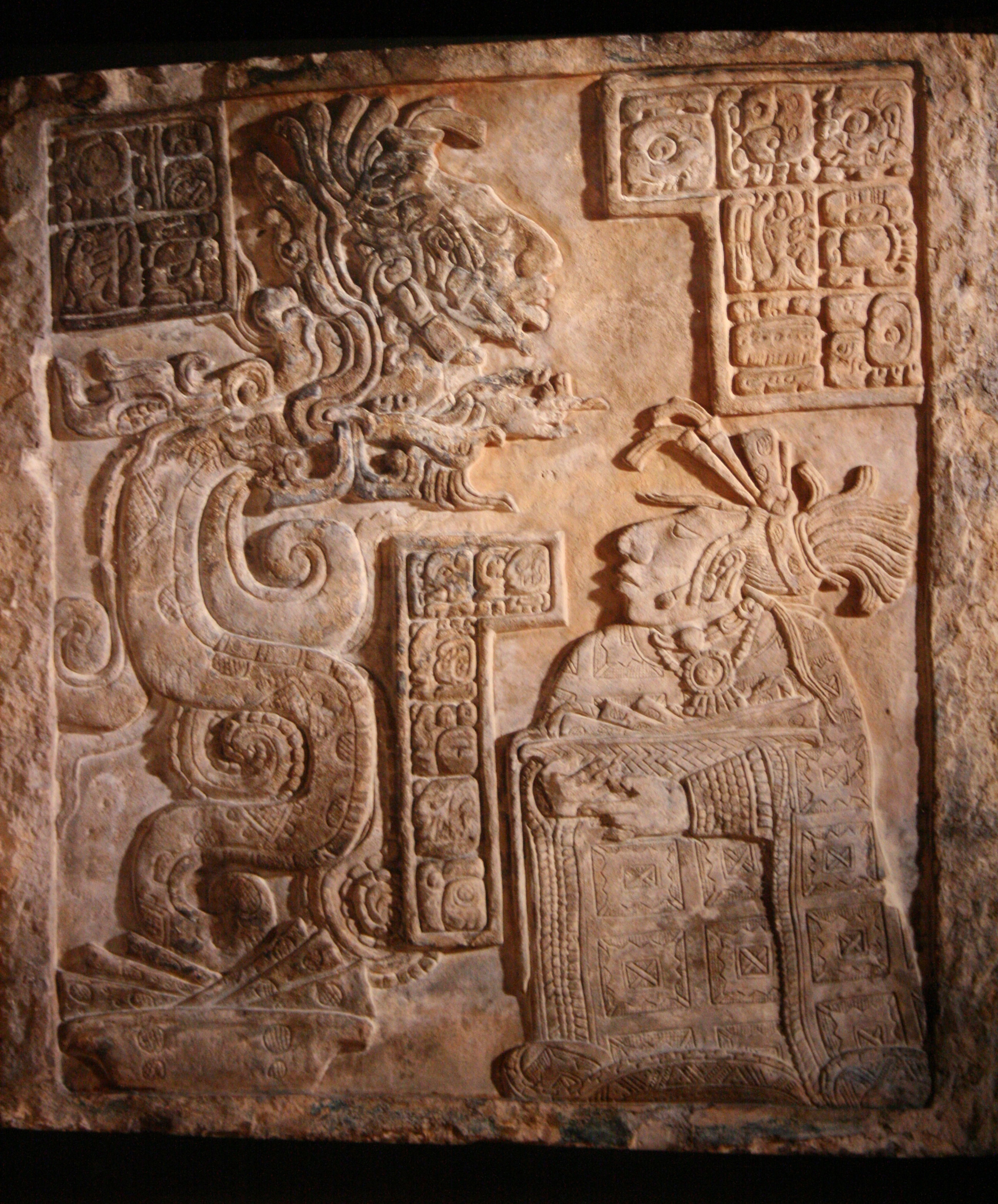
Lintel 15, now in the British Museum, depicting one of the wives of Bird Jaguar IV invoking the Vision Serpent in a bloodletting rite.

Lintel 3 is above the westernmost doorway of Structure 33. It also shows Bird Jaguar IV, this time accompanied by an ally.

Lintel 10 is the last known monument at Yaxchilan, dating to 808. It depicts K'inich Yat Ahk II of Piedras Negras as a captive of Yaxchilan king K'inich Tatbu Skull IV.

Lintel 12 was originally set into Structure 20 in the Central Acropolis. It is now in the Museo Nacional de Antropología in Mexico City.

Lintel 13 is above a doorway in Structure 20. It had fallen when the roof of the building collapsed but has since been reset. The sculpture on the lintel is very well preserved.

Lintel 14 is set above a doorway in Structure 20 and is particularly well preserved.

Lintel 15 originally spanned a doorway in Structure 21, it was removed to the British Museum in 1982–83. Like Lintels 16 and 17 from the same series, it was carved from limestone. It was originally set above the southeast doorway of the central room. Lintel 15 depicts Lady Wak Tuun, one of the wives of king Bird Jaguar IV, during a bloodletting ritual that results in the appearance of the Vision Serpent. Lady Wak Tuun is carrying a basket containing the tools used for the bloodletting ritual, including a stingray spine, rope and bloodstained paper. The Vision Serpent emerges from a bowl containing strips of bark paper.

Lintel 16 also spanned a doorway in Structure 21 and was removed to the British Museum in 1882–3. It was sculpted from limestone and was originally set above the central doorway of the central room. It shows Bird Jaguar IV holding a spear and standing over a kneeling captive. Bird Jaguar IV wears the same costume that his father is depicted wearing on Lintel 26. The capture event depicted on Lintel 16 took place in 752.

Lintel 17 was another lintel from a doorway in Structure 21 that is now in the British Museum. It is sculpted from limestone and was originally set above the northwest doorway of the central room. It dates to the reign of Bird Jaguar IV. The lintel depicts Bird Jaguar IV and his wife Lady B'alam Mut participating in a bloodletting ritual. The king watches while his wife pulls a rope through her tongue draw blood. This ritual is recorded as having taken place eight days after the capture event depicted on Lintel 16.

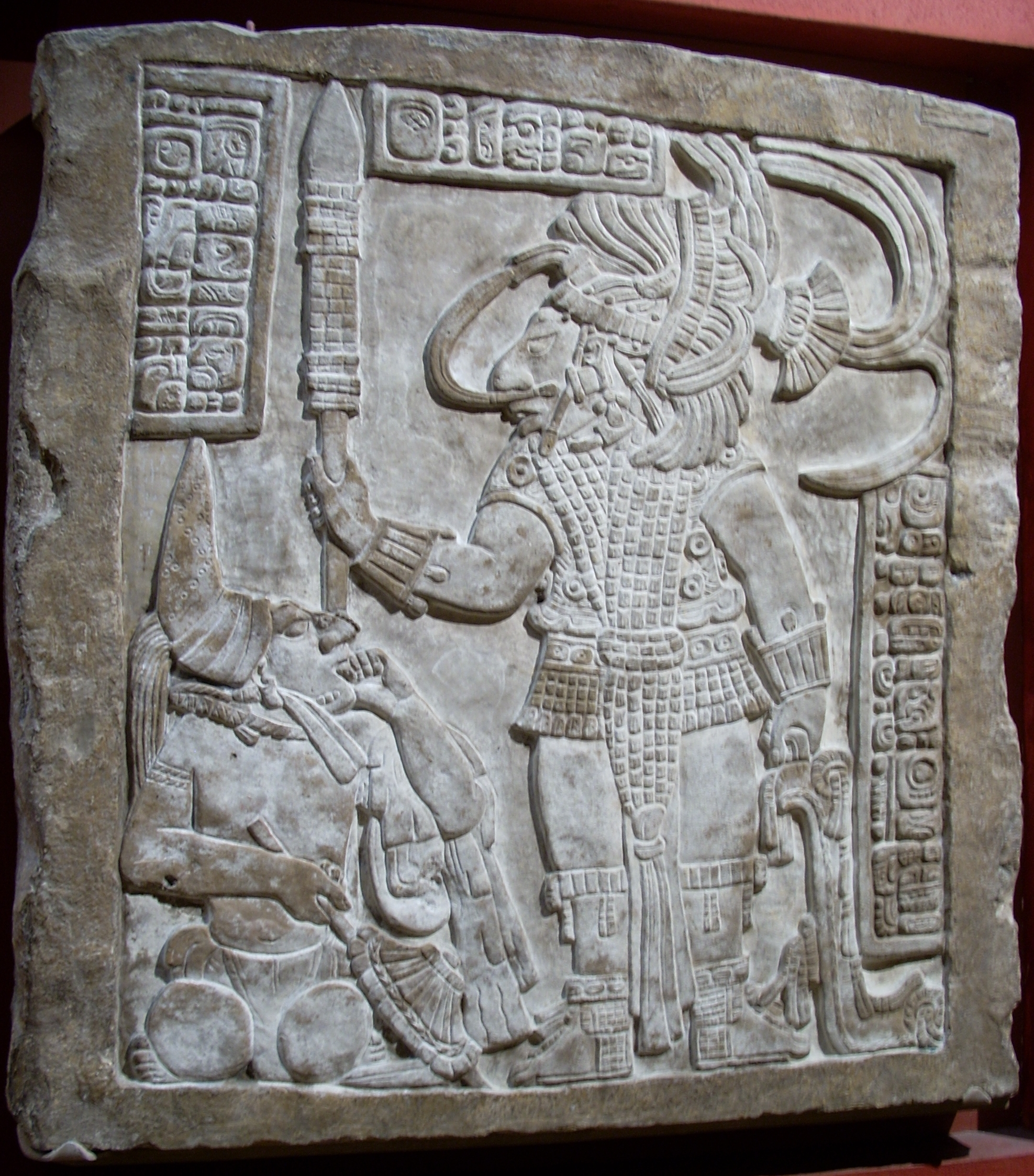
Lintel 16, in the British Museum, depicting king Bird Jaguar IV with a captive.

Lintel 24 is sculpted from limestone and is regarded as a masterpiece of Maya art. It is one of a series of three lintels that were set above the doorways of Structure 23, this one having been set above the southeast doorway. It shows a bloodletting ritual being carried out by king Itzamnaaj B'alam II and his wife Lady K'ab'al Xook, the king stands holding a burning torch over his wife, who pulls a spiked rope through her tongue. A screenfold book lies in a basket in front of the kneeling princess. The lintel has traces of red and blue pigments. The ceremony represented on the sculpture took place on 28 October, 709. Lintel 24 was removed at the end of the 19th century and is now on display in the British Museum.

Lintel 25 was originally set above the central doorway of Structure 23. It was carved from limestone during the reign of king Itzamnaaj B'alam II and shows Lady Xook invoking the Vision Serpent to commemorate the accession of her husband to the throne. Lady Xook holds a bowl containing bloodletting apparatus consisting of a stingray spine and bloodstained paper. The Vision Serpent rising before her has two heads, one at each extreme, from the mouth of one emerges a warrior, from the other emerges the head of central Mexican deity Tlaloc, a water god from the distant metropolis of Teotihuacan in the Valley of Mexico. The hieroglyphic inscription on the lintel is unusual, being reversed as if it were meant to be read in a mirror, although the significance of this is unknown. Like Lintel 24, Lintel 25 was removed at the end of the 19th century and is now on display in the British Museum. The events depicted on the lintel are described as having occurred "in front of the water of Siyan Chan", a reference to the main plaza of the city being located on the shore of the Usumacinta River.

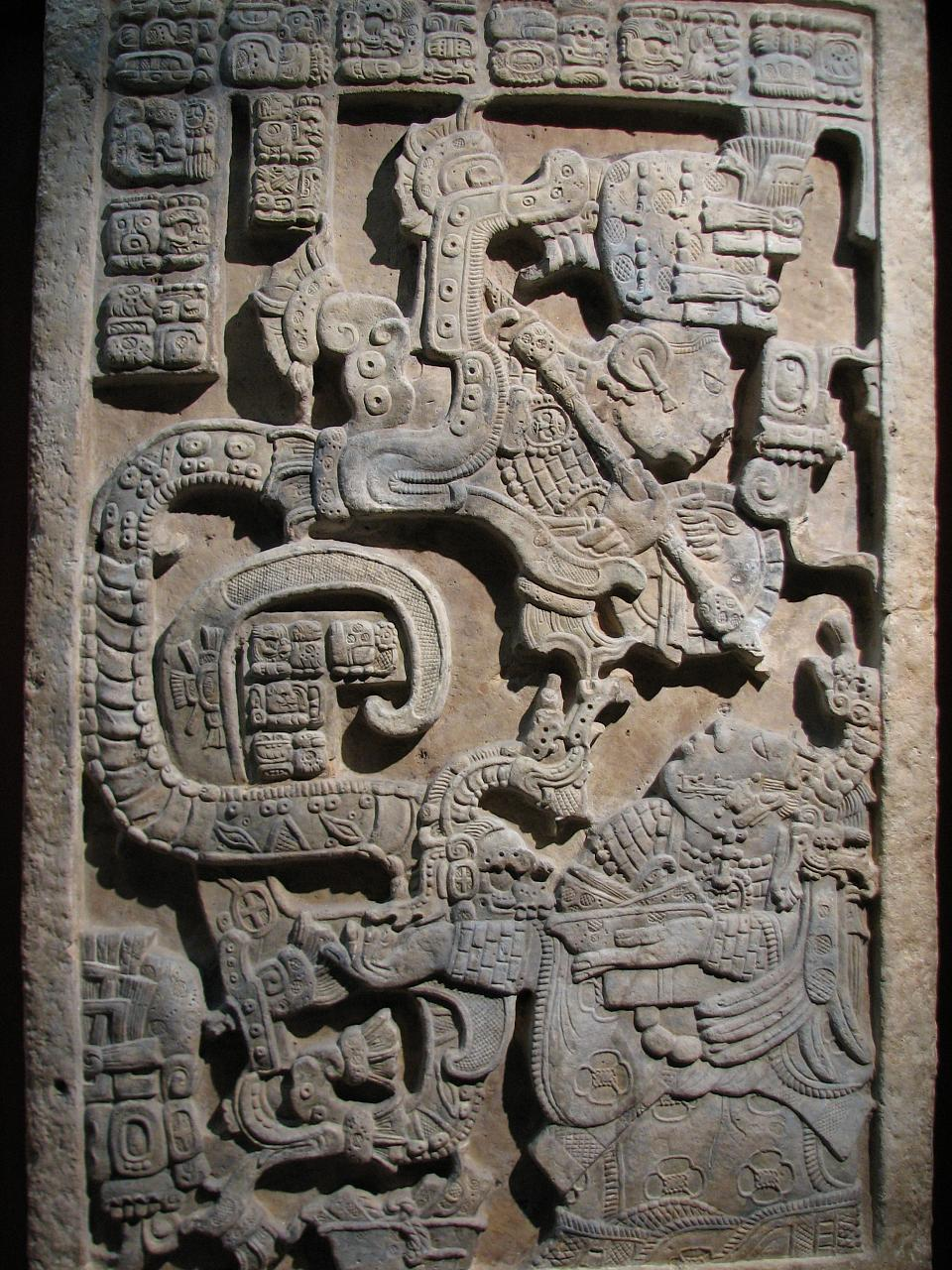
Lintel 25 at Yaxchilan, now in the British Museum.

Lintel 26 was the third in the series set above the doorways of Structure 23, it is now in the Museo Nacional de Antropología in Mexico City. It dates to 726 and bears a portrait of Itzamnaaj B'alam II.

Lintel 29 is set into Structure 10 in the Central Acropolis. It is part of a series of three lintels bearing a continuous hieroglyphic text detailing the birth and accession of king Bird Jaguar IV.

Lintel 30 is part of the lintel series carved with a continuous hieroglyphic text set into Structure 10.

Lintel 31 is another part of the series of three hieroglyphic lintels set into Structure 10.

Lintel 35 was found by Maudslay among the rubble of Structure 12 and is now kept at the British Museum. It was sculpted from limestone in the 6th century under the rule of K'inich Tatb'u Skull II and records a series of victories including that over the great city of Calakmul.

Lintel 38, Lintel 39 and Lintel 40 have been reset in their original positions in Structure 16 in the Central Acropolis. Unlike most of the other lintels at Yaxchilan, they are sculpted on their edges instead of the undersides.

Lintel 41 was set above the south doorway of Structure 42 in the West Acropolis. It had fallen and broken into two pieces when Maudsley found it in the late 19th century. The upper section is on display in the British Museum, the lower section is damaged. The lintel was carved from limestone and is one of a series of lintels set in the same structure that celebrate the victories of king Bird Jaguar IV. The king is shown preparing for a battle that took place in 755, his wife is offering him his spear, she is Lady Wak Jalam Chan Ajaw from the site of Motul de San José in the Petén Lakes region of Guatemala.

Lintel 50 is set into Structure 13 in the Central Acropolis.

Lintel 60 remains in its original setting in Structure 12. It was discovered during excavations of the structure in 1984.

==== Stelae ====
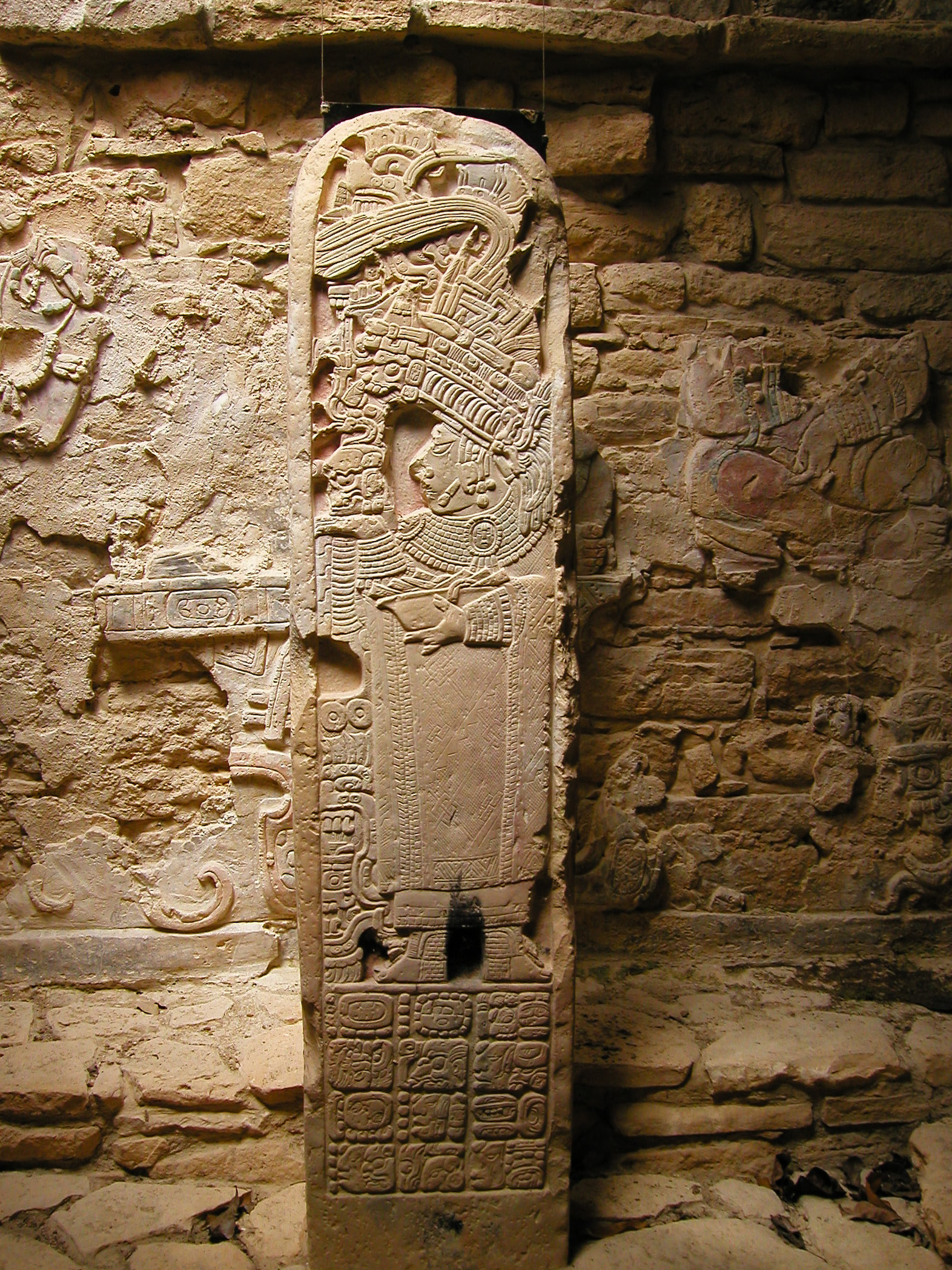
Stela 35 inside Structure 21, dating to the Late Classic. It depicts Lady Eveningstar, the mother of Bird Jaguar IV.

==== Similarities to Chinkultic ====
Interestingly, a number of stelae located at Yaxchilan bear a striking similarity to stelae located at the site of Chinkultic. Both sites have stelae that display scenes of rulers with subordinates on one side and military scenes on the other.

Stela 2 is on the lowest terrace opposite the stairway approach to Structure 33. It is badly weathered and dates to 613.

Stela 3 stands on a platform in the middle of a plaza by Structure 20. It was badly damaged and the fragments have been reassembled and the monument re-erected. One side of the stela has well-preserved sculpture.

Stela 5 is in front of the terrace holding Structure 20. The upper part of this monument depicts king Itzamnaaj B'alam II.

Stela 6 stands in front of the terrace supporting Structure 20. It is largely intact and depicts the 7th-century ruler Bird Jaguar III.

Stela 7 was badly damaged, being broken into fragments. The monument has now been reassembled and the surviving sculpture is of excellent quality. The stela stands in front of a terrace below Structure 20. It depicts a kneeling figure.

Stela 11 originally stood in front of Structure 40. The stela was removed in 1964 and shipped upriver to Agua Azul to be flown to Mexico City for display in the Museo Nacional de Antropología. However, it was too heavy to fly and was returned to Yaxchilan in 1965 and now lies near the bank of the river. The upper side of the stela depicts king Bird Jaguar IV and his father. The figures and the accompanying hieroglyphic panel are very well preserved. There are various dates inscribed on the stela with the earliest being 741. The stela is broken into two parts.

Stela 18 dates from some time after 723. It depicts the victorious king Itzamnaaj B'alam II standing over a kneeling captive, who is identified as Aj Popol Chaj, the ruling lord of Lacanha.

Stela 27 has been re-erected in front of Structure 9 on the Main Plaza in the Central Acropolis. The monument dates to 514 and depicts the king Knot-eye Jaguar I. This stela is the earliest known from Yaxchilan. Stela 27 is particularly notable because it was obviously damaged in antiquity and subsequently restored in the Late Classic, with substantial reworking in the lower third of the stela dating to the time of Bird Jaguar IV.

Stela 31 is located a short distance in front of Structure 33. It is a particularly unusual monument because it is sculpted from a stalactite. It is undated and depicts three incised figures and some hieroglyphs.

Stela 33 is a fragmented monument that was discovered during excavations of the platform supporting Stela 3.

Stela 35 is an exceptionally well preserved monument found during excavations of Structure 21 in 1983. The stela is fairly small and depicts Lady Eveningstar (also known as Lady Ik Skull), the mother of king Bird Jaguar IV.

== See also ==
- El Zotz
- List of Mesoamerican pyramids
- Maya Bridge at Yaxchilan
- Yaxchilan rulers
