= Yoʼnal Ahk =

Yoʼnal Ahk may refer to:

- Kʼinich Yoʼnal Ahk I
- Kʼinich Yoʼnal Ahk II
- Yoʼnal Ahk III, king of the Mayan city Piedras Negras, who ruled AD 758-767
