= Itzam Kʼan Ahk I =

Ajaw of Piedras Negras from 639 to 686

- Ajaw
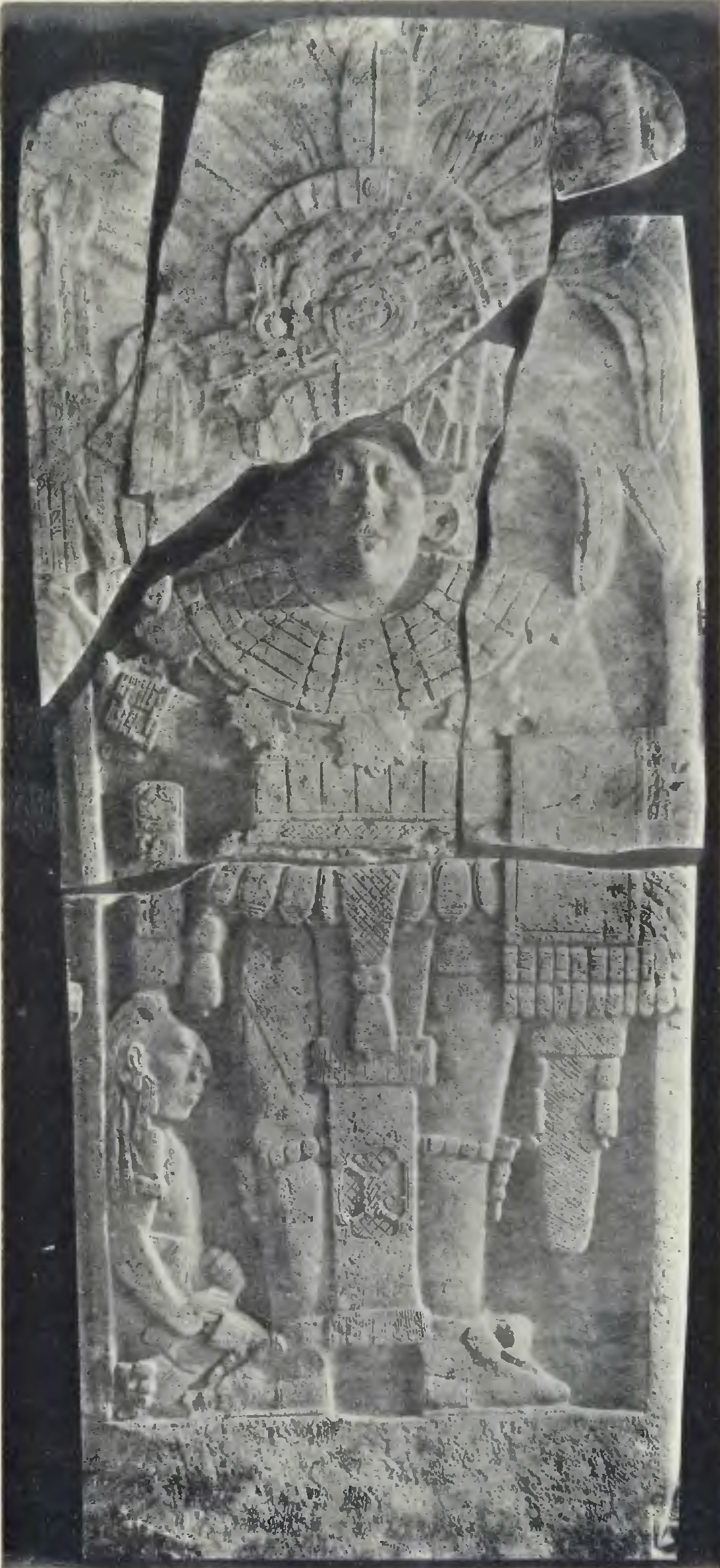
- Itzam Kʼan Ahk I's portrait on Stela 35

King of Piedras Negras
- Reign: 12 April 639 - 15 November 686
- Predecessor: Kʼinich Yoʼnal Ahk I
- Successor: Kʼinich Yoʼnal Ahk II
- Born: 22 May 626; Piedras Negras
- Died: 15 November 686 (aged 60); Piedras Negras
- Consort: Lady White Bird
- Issue: Kʼinich Yoʼnal Ahk II
- Father: Kʼinich Yoʼnal Ahk I
- Mother: Lady Bird Headdress
- Religion: Maya religion

Itzam Kʼan Ahk I (Mayan pronunciation: [itsam kʼan ahk]), also known as Ruler 2, was an ajaw of Piedras Negras, an ancient Maya settlement in Guatemala. He ruled during the Late Classic Period, from AD 639–686. The son of Kʼinich Yoʼnal Ahk I, Itzam Kʼan Ahk I took the throne when he was only 12 years old. His reign was marked by several wars, and he seems to have had a special connection with Calakmul. Itzam Kʼan Ahk I died just a few days before the marriage of his son, who succeeded him as ajaw of Piedras Negras and took on the name Kʼinich Yoʼnal Ahk II. Itzam Kʼan Ahk I left behind several monuments, including eight stelae, three panels, a throne, and a short stela-like column; this made him the most active of Piedras Negras's leaders in regards to erecting monuments.

== Biography ==
=== Reign of Piedras Negras ===
Itzam Kʼan Ahk I, also known as Ruler 2, was the son of Kʼinich Yoʼnal Ahk I and Lady Bird Headdress. Born on May 22, 626 (9.9.13.4.1 6 Imix 19 Sotzʼ in the Long Count), he assumed the position of ajaw ("leader") of Piedras Negras on AD 639 (9.10.6.5.9 8 Muluk 2 Sip)—about two months after his father's demise and when he was only 12 years old. The title kʼinich translates to "sun-faced", and is a reference to the settlement's rulers' belief that they were the "lords of the sun". His name also included the ahk ("turtle") element, identifying him as royalty. His name was later appropriated by his eventual successor, Itzam Kʼan Ahk II, possibly to strengthen the latter's claim of legitimacy.

Itzam Kʼan Ahk I reign was one marked by war and acts of aggression. Thanks to carvings on Stelae 35 and 37, it is known that he undertook two victorious military campaigns: one in AD 662 against Santa Elena (in which he may have captured either a "high-ranking girl" or a young man), and another in AD 669 against a Maya polity whose name is now lost. Further evidence of Itzam Kʼan Ahk I's military strength is suggested by Panel 2, which depicts an ajaw of Piedras Negras surrounded by leaders from nearby polities, like Bonampak, Lacanha, and Piedras Negras's perennial rival Yaxchilan. While it is likely that the ajaw depicted in this scene is Yat Ahk I (who ruled Piedras Negras well before Itzam Kʼan Ahk I's time), Mayanists Simon Martin and Nikolai Grube argue that Itzam Kʼan Ahk I might have carved the panel to emphasize similarities between him and his predecessor, namely their similar level of political prowess. The two scholars also note that Yaxchilan seems to have been in a bit of a Dark Age during Itzam Kʼan Ahk I's reign, lending more evidence to the idea that it was under Piedras Negras's control.

However, despite all the bellicosity during his reign, Flora Clancy notes that his focus on taking care of his children "suggest[s] that [Itzam Kʼan Ahk I] also desired, and endeavored to achieve, peaceful conditions."

=== Death ===
At the end of his life, Itzam Kʼan Ahk I's health began to fail him, and, recognizing that his demise was impending, he spent much of his remaining energy ensuring that his son, Kooj (meaning "Puma") was able to assume control of Piedras Negras. To do this, he arranged a wedding ceremony between Kooj and a Maya princess from the polity of Namaan named Lady K'atun Ajaw of Namaan (whose name means "20-year Queen"). Although Itzam Kʼan Ahk I died on November 15, 686 (9.12.14.10.13 11 Ben 11 Kʼankʼin)—just five days before the ceremony could occur—his corpse seems to have been a "guest of honour" at the wedding. Itzam Kʼan Ahk I was buried nine days after he died, and while the location of his tomb is unknown, clues on Panel 15 (erected by his son) suggest that he was buried somewhere within the pyramid-like Structure J-4. On January 2, 687, Kooj—donning the regnal name Kʼinich Yoʼnal Ahk II—assumed control of the polity.

== Monuments ==
Itzam Kʼan Ahk I erected eight stelae, three panels, a throne, and a short stela-like column, making his tenure as ajaw "the most prolific in terms of royal patronage at Piedras Negras", according to Flora Clancy.

=== Stelae ===
Stela 33 was the first erected and served as Itzam Kʼan Ahk I's ascension monument. Carved on December 1, 642, this stela depicts the ajaw sitting on an elevated cushion; a "plain band" is wrapped around his chest, which Clancy argues represents his being "bound to office". The leader is uniquely shown in profile, looking towards his right at a woman who is offering him "royal regalia". This woman is usually considered to be his mother, although Mark Pitts notes that she could be his wife. O'Neil favors the former argument and writes that Itzam Kʼan Ahk I's mother was likely featured on the stela because she served for a time as her son's regent and was thus politically important.

Itzam Kʼan Ahk I also raised up Stela 32 (November 5, 647), Stela 34 (October 9, 652), Stela 35 (August 18, 662), Stela 36 (July 23, 667), Stela 37 (June 26, 672), Stela 39 (May 31, 677), and Stela 38 (May 6, 682).

Of Itzam Kʼan Ahk I's eight stelae, six (Stelae 32–37) were raised in front of Structure R-5; these stelae purposely face the stelae of Kʼinich Yoʼnal Ahk I so as to "respond" to them.

=== Panels ===
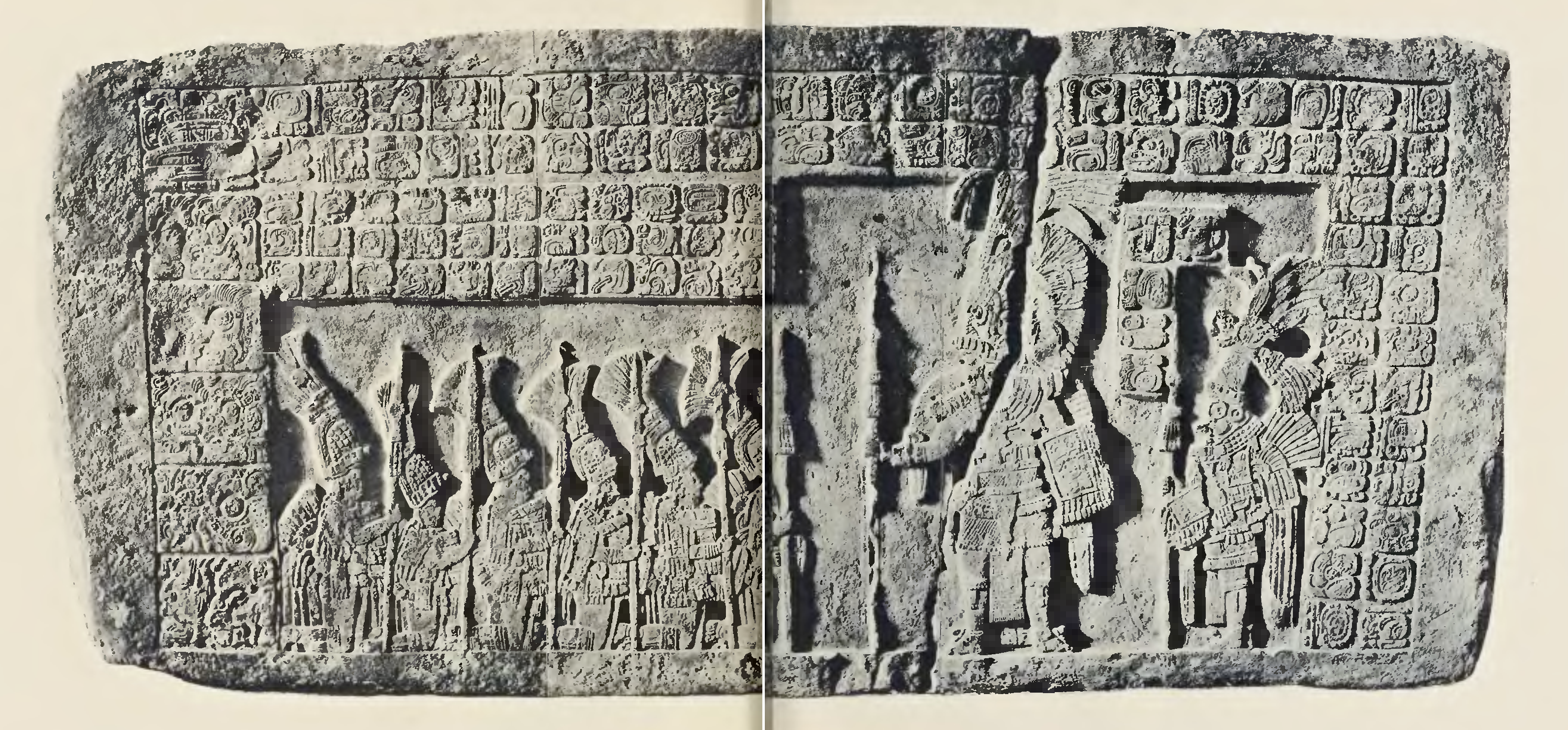
Panel 2, constructed by Itzam Kʼan Ahk I, depicts Yat Ahk I being venerated by leaders from other polities.

Itzam Kʼan Ahk I commissioned Panels 4 and 7.

Itzam Kʼan Ahk I crafted Panel 2 one kʼatun after the death of his father, Kʼinich Yoʼnal Ahk I. The carving is "ambiguous", and while it likely depicts the previous Piedras Negras ajaw Yat Ahk I, it could also simultaneously depict both Yat Ahk I and Kʼinich Yoʼnal Ahk I, thereby connecting the two figures. The leader is shown performing a religious ceremony involving the "grasping" of a Teotihuacan-influenced helmet; the associated glyphs reveal that Itzam Kʼan Ask I performed this ritual in 658—over one hundred years after Yat Ahk I had performed the very same rite in AD 510. The ajaw on the panel is notably surrounded by subservient lords of nearby polities, implying that during Yat Ahk I's rule, Piedras Negras was the regional power. O'Neil notes that the lords are "fully dressed and armed", which suggests "a sense of collaboration and alliance with their Piedras Negras overlord." The panel was later reset and situated near Panel 3 on Structure O-13 during the reign of the last ajaw of Piedras Negras, Kʼinich Yat Ahk II.

=== Other ===
Itzam Kʼan Ahk I commissioned Throne 2.

On September 13, 657, Itzam Kʼan Ahk I also erected what is now called "Stela" 46: it is "squat column" about a meter tall, positioned in the middle of Itzam Kʼan Ahk I's Structure R-5 stelae group, with Stelae 32–34 to its left and Stelae 35–37 to its right. According to Clancy, "It served double-duty as a hotun marker and as an altar for all six of the other stelae in the row."

== Bibliography ==
- Clancy, Flora (2009). The Monuments of Piedras Negras, an Ancient Maya City. University of New Mexico Press. ISBN 9780826344519.
- Houston, Stephen D.; Héctor Escobedo; Richard Terry; David Webster; George Veni; Kitty F. Emer (1999). "Investigations at Piedras Negras, Guatemala: 1999 Field Season" (PDF). Foundation for the Advancement of Mesoamerican Studies.
- Martin, Simon; Grube, Nikolai (2000). Chronicle of the Maya Kings and Queens. Thames & Hudson. ISBN 9780500051030.
- O'Neil, Megan (2014). Engaging Ancient Maya Sculpture at Piedras Negras, Guatemala. University of Oklahoma Press. ISBN 9780806188362.
- Pitts, Mark (2011). A Brief History of Piedras Negras as Told by the Ancient Maya: History Revealed in Maya Glyphs (PDF). Pre-Columbian Society of the University of Pennsylvania Museum.
- Sharer, Robert; Traxler, Loa (2005). The Ancient Maya. Stanford University Press. ISBN 9780804748179.
- Zender, Marc (ed.). "Piedras Negras Ruler 2". Mesoweb Encyclopedia. Archived from the original on June 27, 2018.
