= 608 (disambiguation) =

608 may refer to:

- the year 608 AD
- Area code 608, located in Southwest Wisconsin
- Peugeot 608, Peugeot's current executive car
- Section 608 of the U.S. Clean Air Act, which licenses HVAC technicians in the United States
