= Lady K'atun Ajaw of Namaan =

Lady K'atun Ajaw
- Ajaw
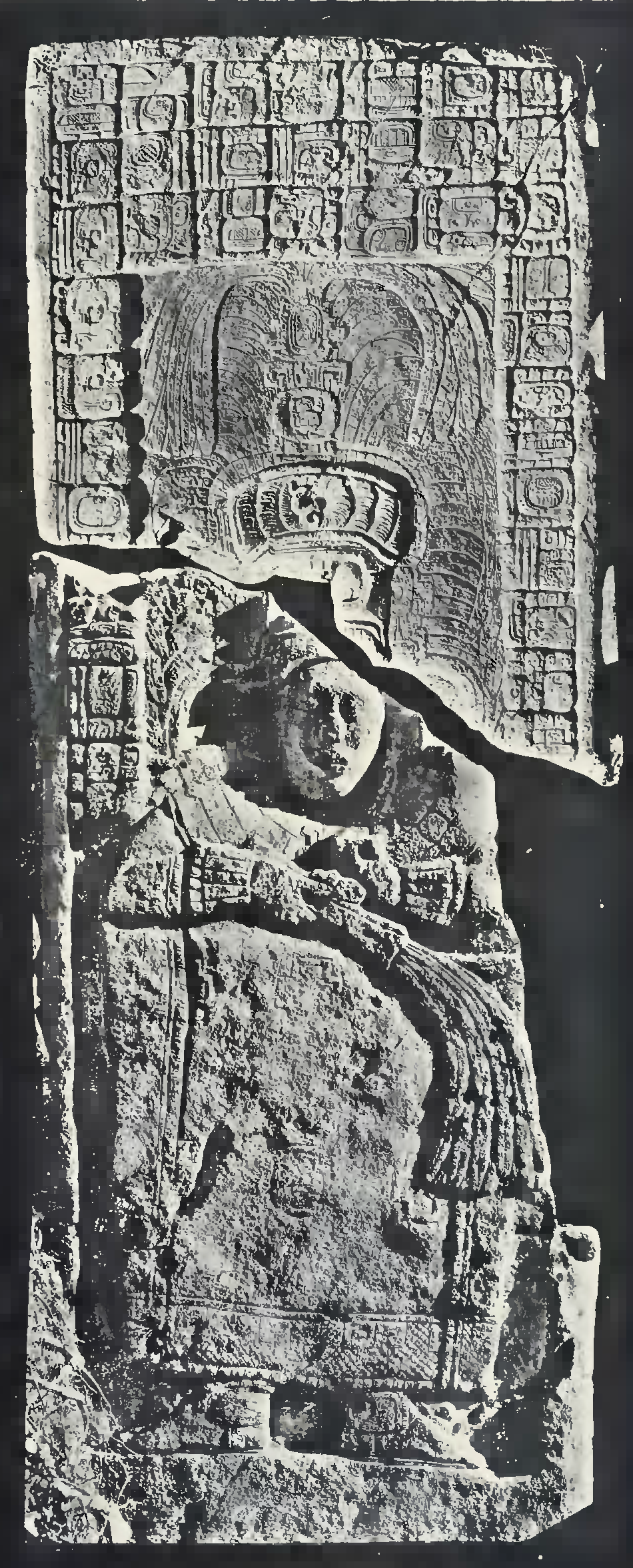
- Lady K'atun Ajaw's portrait in Stela 1

Queen consort of Piedras Negras
- Tenure: January 2, 687 - 729
- Predecessor: Lady White Bird
- Successor: Lady Juntan Ahk (possibly)
- Born: 5 July 674; La Florida
- Died: After 729; Piedras Negras
- Spouse: Kʼinich Yoʼnal Ahk II
- Issue: Lady Juntan Ahk
- Religion: Maya religion

Lady K'atun Ajaw of Namaan (born July 5, 674 CE, 5 Kib 14 Yaxk’in in the Maya calendar), was the queen and consort of K'inich Yo'nal Ahk II, the ajaw (or king) of Piedras Negras, Maya city in Guatemala. Her image appears on stelae 1 and 3 of Piedras Negras. She is also referenced on a set of three conch shells from a royal burial at Piedras Negras, leading some to believe the burial contained her body.

Though scholars typically refer to her as Lady Kʼatun Ajaw, her name in ancient Ch'olan, the language of the hieroglyphs, was probably Ix Winik Haab' Ajaw.

== Biography ==
Coming from the city of Namaan (present-day La Florida), Lady K'atun Ajaw married K'inich Yo'nal Ahk in a five-day ceremony in 686 CE, when she was just 12 years old. In the midst of the wedding, K'inich Yo'nal Ahk's father died, leaving the son to inherit the throne. According to the conch shells, a woman named Lady Ah B’ikal? oversaw the wedding, serving as a mentor to the young girl. It is unclear if this woman was her mother or not.

In September 706, Lady K'atun Ajaw had a stela, Stela 1, dedicated in her name.

K'atun Ajaw had a daughter with Yo'nal Ahk, Lady Ju'ntan Ahk, who was born on March 19, 708 CE. On August 26, 711 CE, Lady K'atun Ajaw received a throne, possibly the same throne upon which she sits on Stela 3. This was also the 25th anniversary of Yo'nal Ahk's accession to the throne. The trio celebrated the closing of the 14th K'atun together on December 3, 711 CE.

It is possible the lack of a male heir became a problem for K'atun Ajaw and her husband, which may have been why they chose to include an image of Ju'ntan Ahk with her mother on Stela 3; children were rare on stelae.

Thanks to difficulties with reading hieroglyphic inscriptions, an important event toward the end of her life is poorly understood. The last date associated with Lady K'atun Ajaw, June 28, 729 CE (1 Kaban 0 Mol), appears on the conch shells. But because of the handwriting on the shells, there is a dispute about the wedding. Some scholars, such as Mark Pitts, suggest Lady K'atun Ajaw was the witness to her husband marrying a second time, probably in a desperate attempt to sire a male heir before his death. Others, such as Kathryn Josserand, believe she witnessed the marriage of her daughter to the future king of Piedras Negras.
