= Kʼan Ahk II =

- King of Piedras Negras
- Ruler B's glyph
- Predecessor: Piedras Negras Ruler A
- Successor: Turtle Tooth
- Father: unknown
- Mother: unknown
- Religion: Maya religion

Kʼan Ahk II, also known as Ruler B was the second ruler of that Mayan city in Guatemala. He was a successor of Ruler A. He reigned c. 478.

Nothing is known of this king except that one of his lieutenants, a yajawte' ("lord of the tree"), was captured by Yaxchilan ruler Bird Jaguar II, probably in AD 478, as recorded at Yaxchilan.

His successor was Turtle Tooth.
