= Piedras Negras Ruler C =

Ruler C
- King of Piedras Negras
- Predecessor: Turtle Tooth
- Successor: K'inich Yo'nal Ahk I
- Father: unknown
- Mother: unknown
- Religion: Maya religion

Piedras Negras Ruler C was a king of the Maya city-state of Piedras Negras. He was the successor of Turtle Tooth, who could be his father.

He is depicted on Panel 12. In the figural scene, Ruler C stands over three kneeling captives, one of whom is Knot-eye Jaguar I of Yaxchilan, who had captured a vassal of Turtle Tooth around 508. Another of the Panel 12 captives is from Santa Elena.

His successor was K'inich Yo'nal Ahk I. It is unknown if he was a son of Ruler C.
