= Kʼinich Yoʼnal Ahk II =

- Ajaw
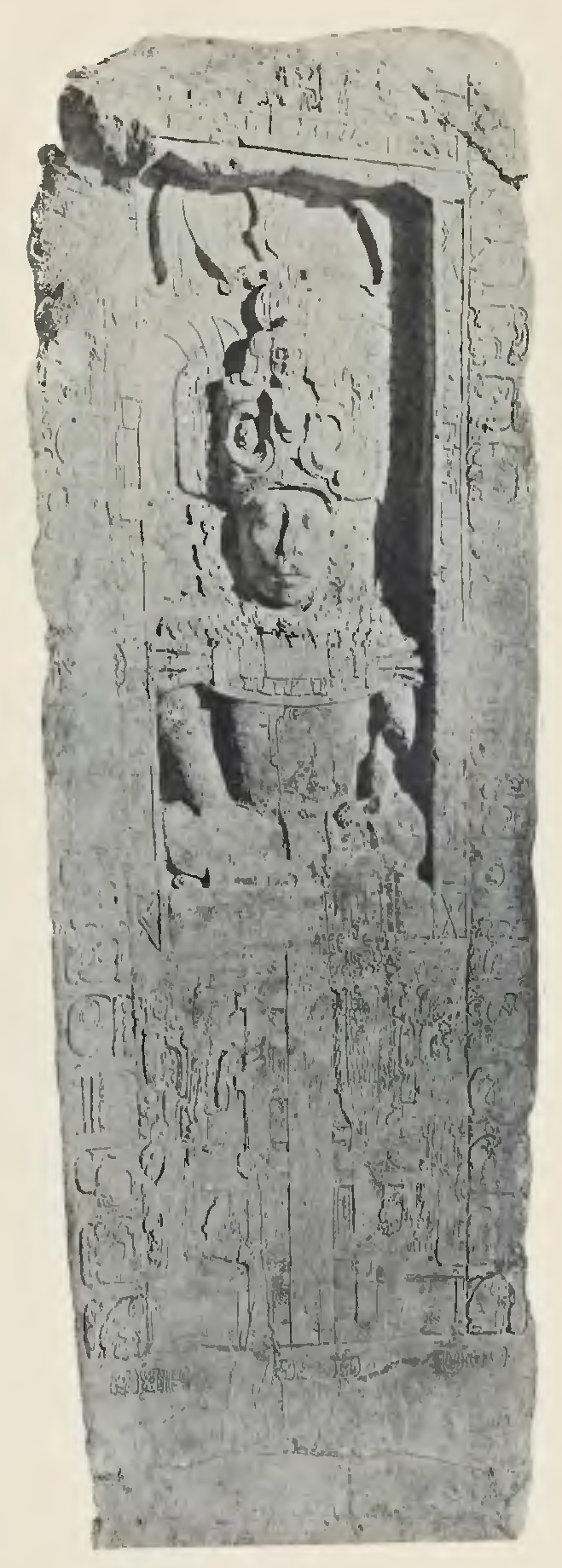
- Kʼinich Yoʼnal Ahk II's portrait in Stela 6

King of Piedras Negras
- Reign: January 2, 687 - 729
- Predecessor: Itzam Kʼan Ahk I
- Successor: Itzam Kʼan Ahk II
- Born: 29 December 664; Piedras Negras
- Died: 729 (aged 64–65); Piedras Negras
- Consort: Lady K'atun Ajaw of Namaan
- Issue: Lady Juntan Ahk
- Father: Itzam Kʼan Ahk I
- Mother: Lady White Bird
- Religion: Maya religion

Kʼinich Yoʼnal Ahk II (born December 29, 664), also known as Ruler 3, was the ajaw (king) of Piedras Negras, a Maya city in Guatemala. He reigned from January 2, 687, until 729.

Because his monuments were used in the pioneering historical research of Tatiana Proskouriakoff, his history has been better-studied than many other Maya kings.

== Biography ==
=== Birth ===
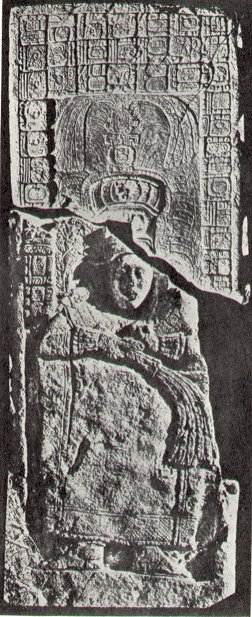
Stela 1 is Kʼinich Yoʼnal Ahk II's monument, though here he pictures his wife Lady K'atun Ajaw.

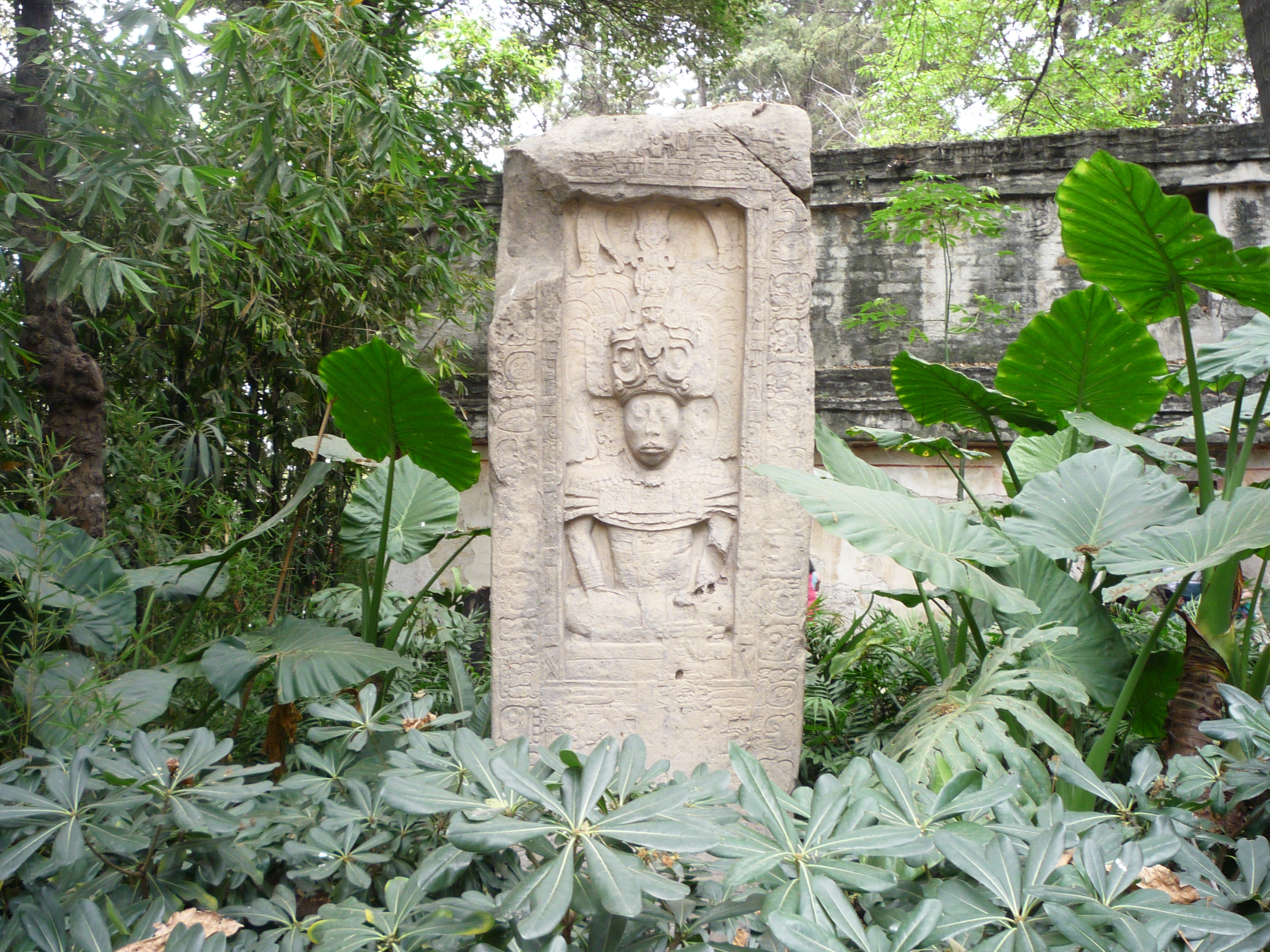
Stela 6 was erected by Kʼinich Yoʼnal Ahk II.

He was born on December 29, 664. His father and mother were Itzam Kʼan Ahk I and Lady White Bird. He was a grandson and namesake of Kʼinich Yoʼnal Ahk I, and his grandmother was Lady Bird Headdress.

His pre-regnal name was Kooj - "Puma". Upon his accession, he took as his regnal name that of his grandfather.

=== Reign ===
Before his accession, he married Lady K'atun Ajaw of Namaan. Their daughter was Lady Ju'ntan Ahk.

Piedras Negras was extremely influential on Classic Maya society despite its small size, and K'inich Yo'nal Ahk II oversaw a flourishing city that produced high-quality art and trade goods. A mask from the site ended up as far north as Chichen Itza. Still, the king seems to have lost important territory, and the influence of the city in the broader Maya world may have constricted during his reign.

Yoʼnal Ahk recorded a number of important ritual events, such as the anniversary of his accession into the kingship and a possible dance in a place called the White "Yek?" House in February 20, 724, described on Stela 8. He celebrated a five-tuns lacking event on December 29, 706, (9.13.15.0.0 in the Maya calendar) which is memorialized on Stela 1 and Panel 15. Also, he celebrated a k'atun ending on December 3, 711, (9.14.0.0.0) which is memorialized on stelae 3 and 8.

He displayed a proper reverence for his father by commemorating the twenty-year anniversary of his burial with a burning ritual. He captured a sajal of Itzamnaaj Bahlam III in 726. Like his father, he reigned for more than forty years.

No known records note his death, but the following ruler was in office by November 11, 729, according to Altar 2. As he was alive for a wedding on June 28, 729 according to a set of conch shells from a burial in Piedras Negras, he must have died in that year.

The conch shells paint a confusing picture of the end of his life. Because his only known child was a girl, there may have been a dynastic struggle over her role in the city's government. One interpretation of the confusing grammar of the shells is that, toward the end of his life, he attempted to marry a new woman--possibly a woman from Palenque based on her name, Ix Matawiil Sotz'--to produce a male heir, but died before producing a child.

On the other hand, the grammar aligns with descriptions of his own wedding; in his wedding, his father served as an observer before dying shortly afterward. This leads some scholars to suggest that the marriage describes the marriage of Yo'nal Ahk's daughter (going under an adult name) to someone else, possibly Itzam K'an Ahk II, the ruler to serve immediately after Yo'nal Ahk. Such a marriage would explain why there is a gap of less than a year between the death of Yo'nal Ahk and the accession of Itzam K'an Ahk II, whereas at Yaxchilan, one dynastic interruption took nearly ten years to resolve.
