= Kʼan Ahk I =

- King of Piedras Negras
- Reign: c. 460
- Successor: Piedras Negras Ruler B
- Father: Unknown
- Mother: Unknown
- Religion: Maya religion

Kʼan Ahk I, also known as Ruler A was a king of the Mayan city of Piedras Nigras. He is also known as Turtleshell.

He reigned c. 460. It seems that he was captured.

His name combines the distinctive knotted headdress of God N with that aged earth deity's turtle shell and kʼan ("yellow/precious") marking; altogether it is probably read as itzamkʼanahk.
