= Yat Ahk I =

- King of Piedras Negras
- Yat Ahk I's glyph
- Predecessor: Piedras Negras Ruler B
- Successor: Piedras Negras Ruler C
- Father: unknown
- Mother: unknown
- Religion: Maya religion

Yat Ahk I was the third king of Mayan city-state Piedras Negras in Guatemala. He is also known as Ah Cauac Ah K'in, and by the English translation of his name, Turtle Tooth.

The first mention of Yat Ahk I comes in the inscriptions of Yaxchilan when one of his sublords is captured by Knot-eye Jaguar I. However, it is likely that Piedras Negras had gained some degree of ascendancy over Yaxchilan.

It is possible that he is depicted on Panel 2.

His successor was Piedras Negras Ruler C. He could be his son.

The eleventh and final ajaw of Piedras Negras, K'inich Yat Ahk II, appears to have taken his name in memory of Yat Ahk I.

== Bibliography ==
- O'Neil, Megan (2014). Engaging Ancient Maya Sculpture at Piedras Negras, Guatemala. University of Oklahoma Press. ISBN 9780806188362.
