= Kʼinich Yoʼnal Ahk I =

Ajaw of Piedras Negras from 603 to 639

- Ajaw
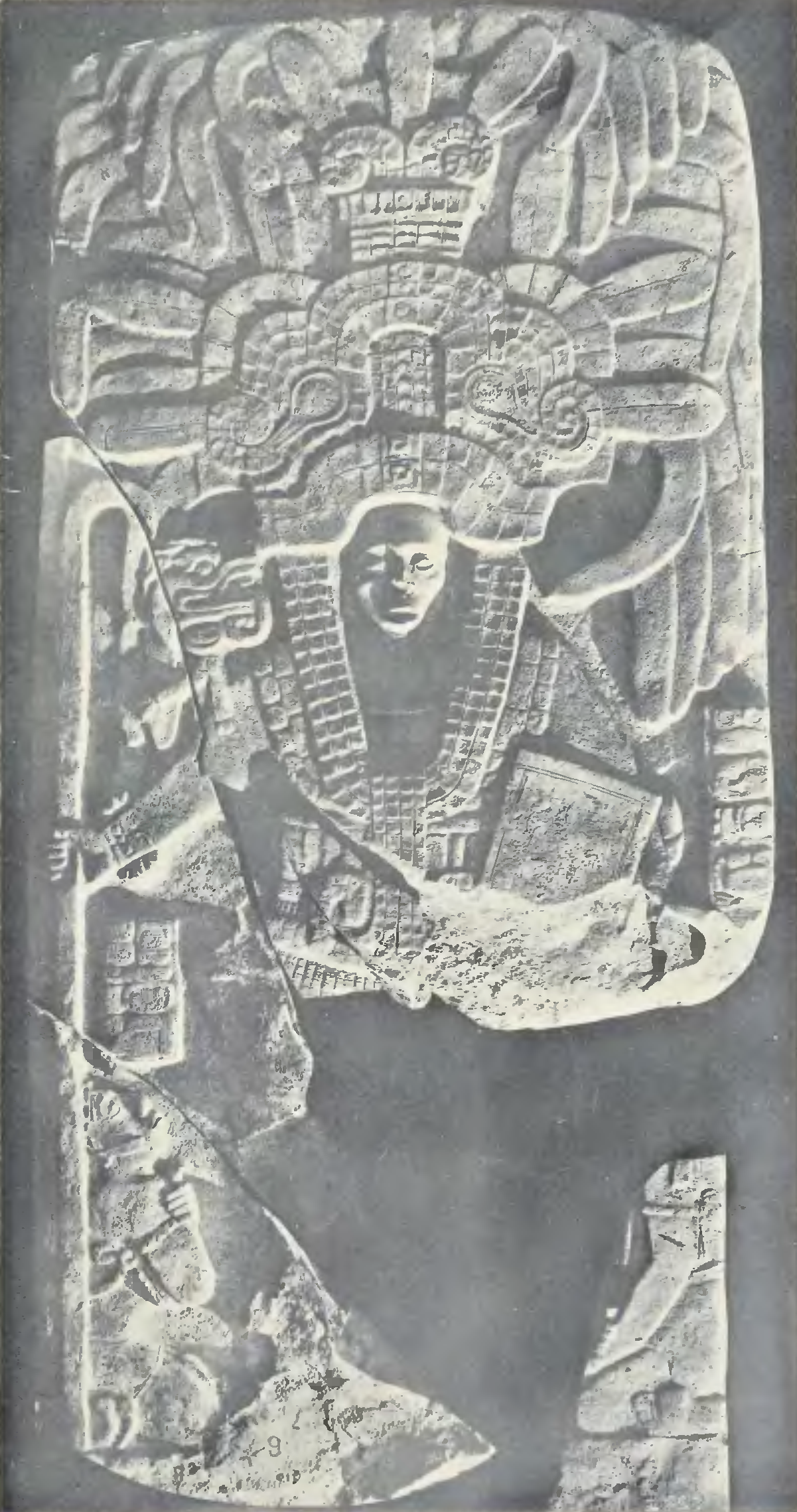
- Kʼinich Yoʼnal Ahk I's portrait in Stela 26

King of Piedras Negras
- Reign: 14 November 603 - 3 February 639
- Predecessor: Unknown (Note: Although it is known that Ruler C reigned over Piedras Negras prior to Kʼinich Yoʼnal Ahk I, the two kings are separated by a gap of almost 64 years.)
- Successor: Itzam Kʼan Ahk I
- Died: 3 February 639; Piedras Negras
- Consort: Lady Bird Headdress
- Issue: Itzam Kʼan Ahk I
- Religion: Maya religion

Kʼinich Yoʼnal Ahk I (Mayan pronunciation: [kʼinitʃ joːnal ahk]), also known as Ruler 1 (died February 3, 639 AD), was an ajaw of Piedras Negras, an ancient Maya settlement in Guatemala. He ruled during the Late Classic Period, from 603–639 AD. It has been proposed that he began a new dynasty at Piedras Negras, following years of ineffective kings. As to how Kʼinich Yoʼnal Ahk I came to power, a consensus has not yet been reached, although it is known that he waged several successful wars against Palenque and Sak Tzʼiʼ. He was succeeded by his son, Itzam Kʼan Ahk I, in 639 AD and left behind several monuments, including stelae at Piedras Negras and a large mortuary temple now known as Pyramid R-5.

== Biography ==
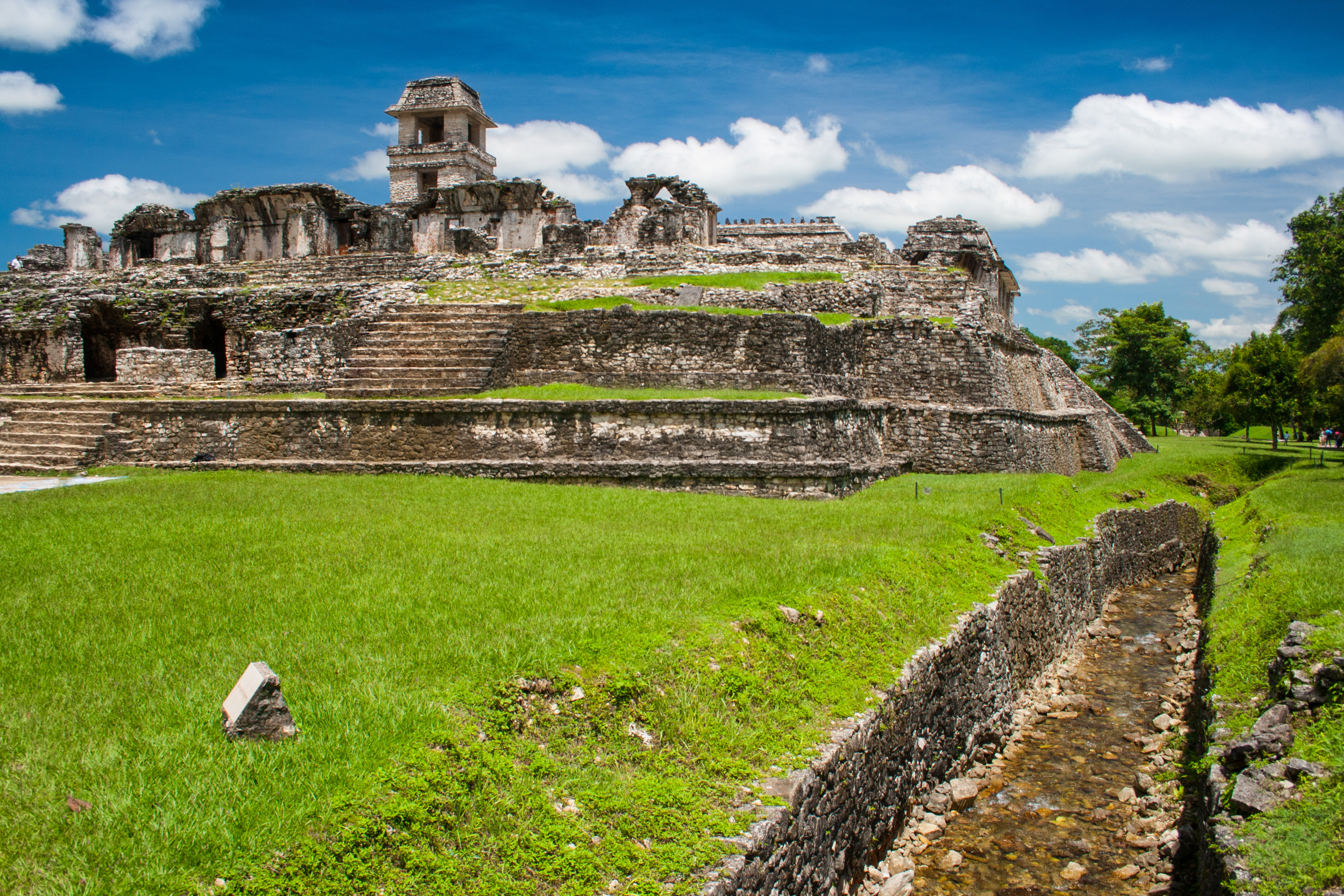
According to stela at Piedras Negras, Kʼinich Yoʼnal Ahk I waged a successful war against Palenque (pictured).

Kʼinich Yoʼnal Ahk I, also known as Ruler 1, was an ajaw (leader) of Piedras Negras in the 7th century AD. According to Mayanists Simon Martin and Nikolai Grube, the ruler's name means "Great-Sun ?-Turtle". His name was later taken by the future leaders of Piedras Negras, Kʼinich Yoʼnal Ahk II and Yoʼnal Ahk III. The title kʼinich translates to "red-faced", and is a reference to the settlement's rulers' belief that they were the "lords of the sun". Kʼinich Yoʼnal Ahk I ascended to the position of ajaw on November 14, 603 AD (9.8.10.6.16 10 Kib 9 Mak in the Long Count), although the exact details surrounding his ascension are unknown. Mayanists Stephen D. Houston and Charles Golden have hypothesized that he founded a new line of rulers at Piedras Negras, possibly following some disaster that dethroned the previous leaders.

Kʼinich Yoʼnal Ahk I systematically razed buildings and monuments at Piedras Negras erected or associated with previous kings, seemingly to thoroughly cleanse the center of any reminder of these "discredited" rulers. This period of destruction—which focused heavily on structures in and around the West Group of the site—was likely ritualized, as evidenced by tell-tale clues left behind, such as offerings of pottery, jade, and small figures. After this period of destruction, Kʼinich Yoʼnal Ahk I moved his focus to the South Group, where he began to erect new buildings.

Kʼinich Yoʼnal Ahk I waged battles against Palenque (Piedras Negras's main rival in the area) and Sak Tzʼiʼ (a "lesser polity"); in the former war, he reportedly captured an aj kʼuhuun ("lord") named Chʼok Balam, and in the latter he is said to have captured an ajaw named Kʼab Chan Teʼ. Kʼinich Yoʼnal Ahk I died on February 3, 639 AD (9.10.6.2.1 5 Imix 19 Kʼayab), was likely buried at Pyramid R-5, and was succeeded by his son, Itzam Kʼan Ahk I, who later dedicated or re-opened his father's tomb in 658 AD.

== Monuments ==
=== Stelae ===
Kʼinich Yoʼnal Ahk I erected numerous stelae, many of which became veritable models for those constructed by other rulers of Piedras Negras. Kʼinich Yoʼnal Ahk I's first was Stela 25, which cemented the use of the "niche" style; these monuments feature the ajaw in a small hollow, seated on an intricately decorated elevated platform, thereby symbolically suggesting that the leader has been lifted into the air. On Stela 25, Kʼinich Yoʼnal Ahk I is seated on a "jaguar cushion", connected to the ground by a ladder stained with bloody footprints (representing human sacrifice). Above the king is the sky, iconized as a great canopy, and above this is a "great celestial bird, the avian aspect of the [Maya] god dubbed Itzamna".

Stela 26, dating from 628 AD, depicts the aforementioned war with Palenque. This monument marks the first time that a stela at Piedra Negras featured carvings on multiple sides (which, in this case, were dedication texts). Stela 26 is aligned with Itzam Kʼan Ahk II's Stela 35, conveying "an image of continuity, repetition, and renewal over time and across generations." Stela 31, which dates from around 637 AD and depicts the war with Sak Tzʼiʼ, was raised in front of Structures R-3 and R-4—the location of many of Piedras Negras's earliest monuments. This stela was also extremely tall, at about 4.5–5-metre (15–16 ft) meters in height, and featured an "expansion" platform that allowed for easier observation.

Both Stelae 26 and 31 feature another theme popular with Kʼinich Yoʼnal Ahk I: the "warrior king" motif. This design often depicts the king facing forward, wearing a large headdress featuring iconography of the "Teotihuacan War Serpent".

=== R-5 Pyramid ===
Kʼinich Yoʼnal Ahk I was likely buried in the R-5 Pyramid, based mostly on evidence from Panel 4, crafted by Itzam Kʼan Ahk I. This carving explicitly labels the pyramid as the muk (i.e. burial) of Kʼinich Yoʼnal Ahk I, and records how Itzam Kʼan Ahk I either dedicated or ceremonially re-opened the structure. Despite this testimony, no body has ever been found in the pyramid, although the search was complicated by—and eventually abandoned because of—loose detritus left behind by looters. Most of the pyramid was probably constructed following Kʼinich Yoʼnal Ahk I's death, likely under the supervision of Itzam Kʼan Ahk I, who eventually raised six stelae at its base.

== Bibliography ==
- Houston, Stephen D.; Héctor Escobedo; Richard Terry; David Webster; George Veni; Kitty F. Emer (1999). "Investigations at Piedras Negras, Guatemala: 1999 Field Season" (PDF). Foundation for the Advancement of Mesoamerican Studies.
- Martin, Simon; Grube, Nikolai (2000). Chronicle of the Maya Kings and Queens. Thames & Hudson. ISBN 9780500051030.
- O'Neil, Megan (2014). Engaging Ancient Maya Sculpture at Piedras Negras, Guatemala. University of Oklahoma Press. ISBN 9780806188362.
- Scherer, Andrew (2003). "Classic Maya Death at Piedras Negras, Guatemala". Antropologa de la Eternidad: La Muerte en la Cultura Maya. Sociedad Espaola de Estudios Mayas. pp. 113–144. ISBN 9788492354535.
- Sharer, Robert; Traxler, Loa (2005). The Ancient Maya. Stanford University Press. ISBN 9780804748179.
- Witschey, Walter Robert Thurmond; Brown, Clifford (2012). Historical Dictionary of Mesoamerica. Scarecrow Press. ISBN 9780810871670.
