= 608 =

Calendar year

608 in various calendars
- Gregorian calendar: 608; DCVIII
- Ab urbe condita: 1361
- Armenian calendar: 57; ԹՎ ԾԷ
- Assyrian calendar: 5358
- Balinese saka calendar: 529–530
- Bengali calendar: 14–15
- Berber calendar: 1558
- Buddhist calendar: 1152
- Burmese calendar: −30
- Byzantine calendar: 6116–6117
- Chinese calendar: 丁卯年 (Fire Rabbit); 3305 or 3098 — to — 戊辰年 (Earth Dragon); 3306 or 3099
- Coptic calendar: 324–325
- Discordian calendar: 1774
- Ethiopian calendar: 600–601
- Hebrew calendar: 4368–4369
- Hindu calendars
- Vikram Samvat: 664–665
- Shaka Samvat: 529–530
- Kali Yuga: 3708–3709
- Holocene calendar: 10608
- Iranian calendar: 14 BP – 13 BP
- Islamic calendar: 14 BH – 13 BH
- Japanese calendar: N/A
- Javanese calendar: 497–498
- Julian calendar: 608; DCVIII
- Korean calendar: 2941
- Minguo calendar: 1304 before ROC 民前1304年
- Nanakshahi calendar: −860
- Seleucid era: 919/920 AG
- Thai solar calendar: 1150–1151
- Tibetan calendar: མེ་མོ་ཡོས་ལོ་ (female Fire-Hare); 734 or 353 or −419 — to — ས་ཕོ་འབྲུག་ལོ་ (male Earth-Dragon); 735 or 354 or −418

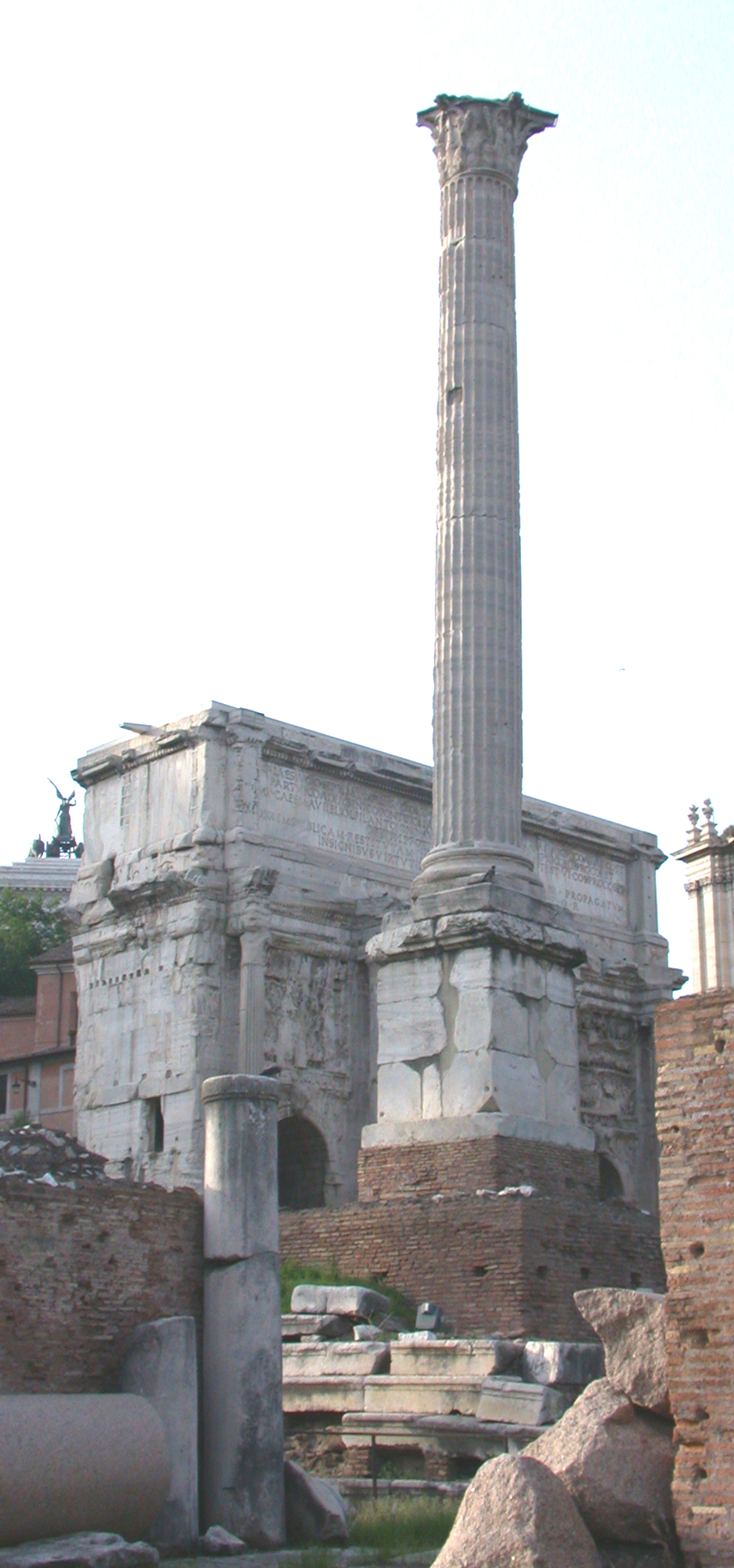
The Column of Phocas (Rome)

Year 608 (DCVIII) was a leap year starting on Monday of the Julian calendar. The denomination 608 for this year has been used since the early medieval period, when the Anno Domini calendar era became the prevalent method in Europe for naming years.

== Events ==
=== By place ===
==== Byzantine Empire ====
- Heraclian revolt: Heraclius the Elder, exarch of Africa, and his son (also named Heraclius) revolt against Emperor Phocas, whose regime in Constantinople has become unpopular and violent.
- Heraclius proclaims himself and his son as consuls, claiming the imperial title—and mint coins with the two wearing the consular robes. Syria and Palaestina Prima revolt.
- Byzantine–Persian War: King Khosrau II invades Armenia, and raids deep into Anatolia through the Byzantine provinces of Cappadocia, Phrygia, Galatia, and Bithynia.

==== Europe ====
- August 1 – The Column of Phocas at Rome is dedicated in honour of Phocas. The Corinthian column has a height of 13.6 m (44 ft).

==== Britain ====
- Eochaid Buide succeeds his father Áedán mac Gabráin as king of Dál Riata (modern Scotland).

==== Asia ====
- Sui dynasty Emperor Yang of Sui expresses the desire to control routes to the West, leading to two and a half centuries of Chinese military and trading activities in Central Asia.

=== By topic ===
==== Religion ====
- September 25 – Pope Boniface IV succeeds Boniface III, as the 67th pope of Rome.
- The observance of Halloween in the Roman Catholic Church is first recorded.
- The Georgian Orthodox Church returns to Chalcedonism (approximate date).

== Births ==
- Charibert II, king of Aquitaine (approximate date)
- Philibert of Jumièges, Frankish abbot (approximate date)
- Muawiyah I, founder of the Umayyad Caliphate (d. 680)

== Deaths ==
- Áedán mac Gabráin, king of Dál Riata

== Sources ==
- Kaegi, Walter Emil (2003). Heraclius: Emperor of Byzantium. Cambridge: Cambridge University Press. ISBN 0-521-81459-6.
