= Laxtunich =

Archaeological Maya site in Chiapas, Mexico

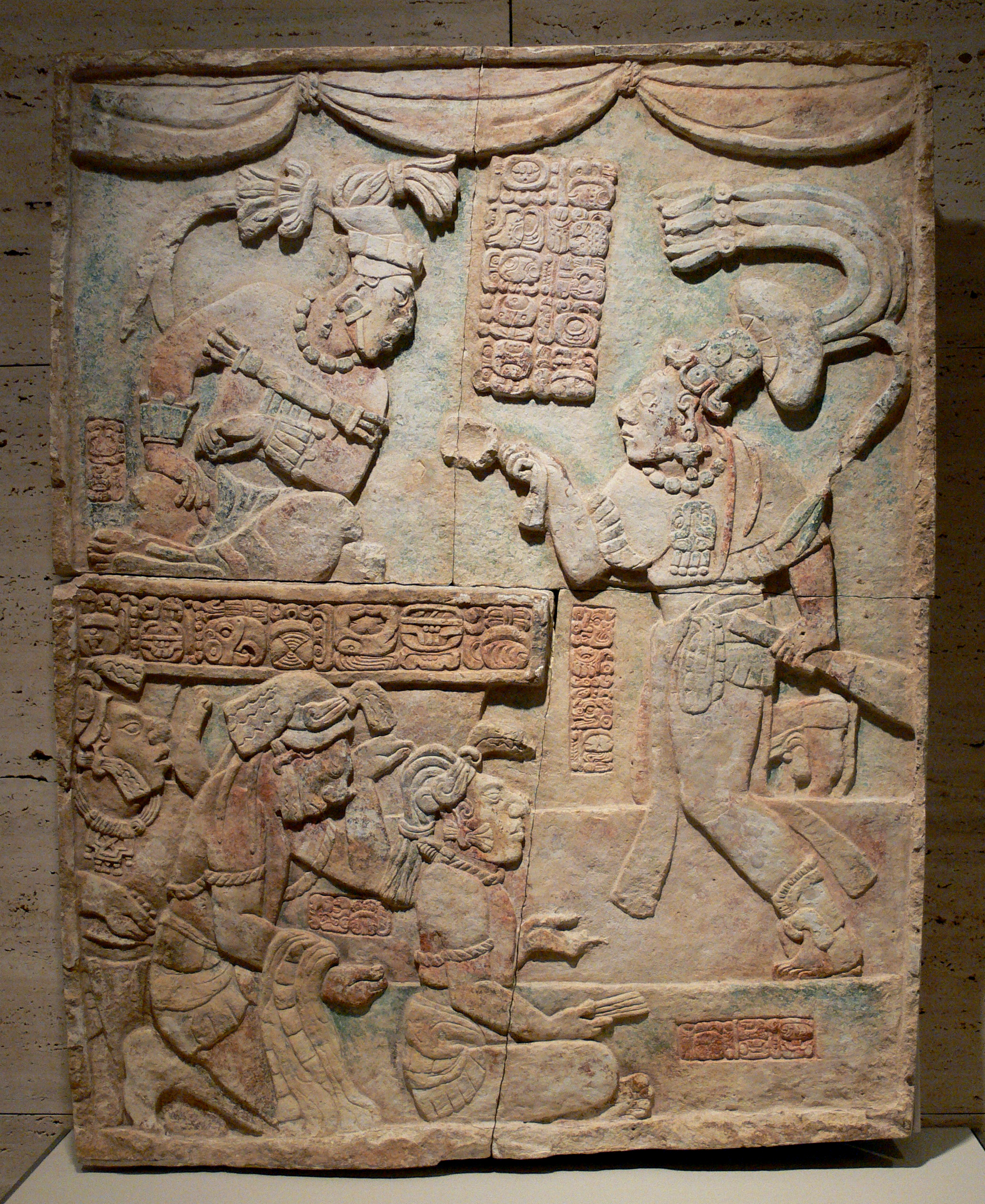
- Lintel 1 of Laxtunich
- Type: Archaeological Maya site
- Periods: Late Classic
- Cultures: Maya civilization
- Satellite of: Yaxchilan
- Location: Mexico
- Region: Chiapas

Site notes
- Architectural style: Usumacinta

Laxtunich is an archaeological Maya site located in the state of Chiapas, Mexico, near the ancient Maya city of Yaxchilan, in the Usumacinta river region. It was a secondary site near the Usumacinta River developed between the Middle Classic and the Late Classic periods as a vassal and subordinate city of the kingdom of Yaxchilan. The site is known primarily for the discovery of stone lintels depicting political scenes of the Maya royalty, considered refined examples of Late Classic Maya art in the Usumacinta region. Its most important ruler was Aj Chak Maax, a vassal of Itzamnaaj Bahlam IV of Yaxchilan as narrated in the lintels of Laxtunich.

== Lintels ==
Lintel 1 is considered a great work of Late Classic Maya art and shares similarity with the stelae of Yaxchilan. It illustrates and narrates a palace scene that occurred on August 24, 781 AD, where the ruler of Yaxchilan, Itzamnaaj Bahlam IV named by the inscription as Chelew Chan K'inich, (his name before ascending to power), is shown finely dressed sitting in a throne inside a palace as represented by the curtains adorning the top of the lintel, he is shown in front of a vassal ruler known as Aj Chak Maax who held the title of sajal of Laxtunich who presents and offers him three high-ranking captives as tribute. The captives are represented with signs of suffering and humiliation, the main one being a captive named Baah Wayib, captured by Aj Chak Maax as indicated in the hieroglyphic inscription. The place of origin of these captives is not mentioned on the lintel, but they could have been captured somewhere near Laxtunich and Yaxchilan. The hieroglyphic inscription on the lintel narrates this scene as: "On the 5 Ix 7 Sak, Baah Wayib was captured by Aj Chak Maax. Three days later his captives were presented to its lord". The text below Itzamnaaj Bahlam IV contains the inscription: "He is Chelew Chan K’inich, captor of Taj Mo’, sacred lord of Yaxchilan". This monument was created by the sculptor Mayuy Ti’ Chuwen as shown with a signature on the lintel.

== History ==
The archaeological site of Laxtunich was discovered and documented for the first and only time in the early 1950s by the explorer and travel writer Dana Lamb on an expedition on the Usumacinta River in which he described the discovery of an archaeological site in the state of Chiapas, Mexico very close to Yaxchilan and he named it Laxtunich, which means “carved stone” in reference to a group of lintels that were found in situ, however, he did not leave information of its exact location and it has remained unknown ever since. Some researchers have attempted to propose several sites already discovered as possible candidates for being Laxtunich but at no known site has there been a record of a sculptural discovery of similar lintels or looting remains that match the Laxtunich monuments or the photographs and descriptions given by Dana Lamb, or that match the information recorded on the lintels themselves, therefore, to this day it is still considered a Maya site not located in the jungle of the Mexican state of Chiapas. At some point during its discovery, the known lintels from Laxtunich were looted and taken out of Mexico. Years later, one of these appeared in the Kimbell Art Museum in Fort Worth, Texas, where it is currently on display. It is described as a Maya monument found near the Usumacinta River in Mexico, which possibly adorned a palace and was purchased from a private collector in 1971.

== See also ==
- Yaxchilan
- El Chicozapote
- Itzamnaaj Bahlam IV
