= Itzamnaaj Bahlam IV =

- Ajaw of Yaxchilan
- Reign: before February 735 - 808?
- Predecessor: Yaxun B'ahlam IV
- Successor: K'inich Tatbu Joloom IV
- Born: Chelew Chan K'inich probably 2 July 741 CE
- Died: 808?
- Spouse: Ix Ch'ab Ajaw
- House: K'uhul Kaab Ajaw, K'uhul Pa'chan Ajaw
- Father: Yaxun B'ahlam IV
- Mother: Ix Chak Joloom

Itzamnaaj Bahlam IV (2 July 741 AD to 808?) was a Maya ajaw (king) of the city of Yaxchilan. He was the son of Yaxun Bahlam IV and Lady Chak Joloom. While Iztamnaaj may have been his name, some epigraphers argue for Kokaaj as the reading; he is also sometimes called Shield Jaguar because of the appearance of the glyphs in his name. Before he came into office, he used the pre-accession name of Chelew Chan K'inich, a name which he continued to use on monuments such as an unprovenanced panel held in the Kimball Art Museum. His son was K'inich Tatbu Joloom IV, who became ruler of Yaxchilan after his father's death.

Like his father and grandfather, he commissioned a number of monuments to document his rule. These include stelae 5, 7, 20, 21, 22, 24, and 29; Lintels 12, 13, 14, 51, 52, 53, 54, 57, and 58; Hieroglyphic Stairway 5; and Altar 10. Lintels 1, 2, 3, and 55 may also be from his reign.

He appears to have a particularly close relationship with his maternal uncle, who may have served as his regent after his father's death or another important role in his administration. On the day of his birth, his mother and uncle performed a ritual involving the summoning of K'awiil.

Itzamnaaj Bahlam was involved in military conquests of small sites surrounding Yaxchilan and was allies with the site of Laxtunich. On August 27, 783, a general named Aj Chak Maax presented Itzamnaaj Bahlam with captives as gifts. This event was memorialized in an inscription carved by Mayuy Ti' Chuween from K'ina, a sculptor who also worked at Laxtunich.

He was also involved with the accession of the leader of Bonampak.
